= National Day of the Sun =

Annual celebration in Argentina

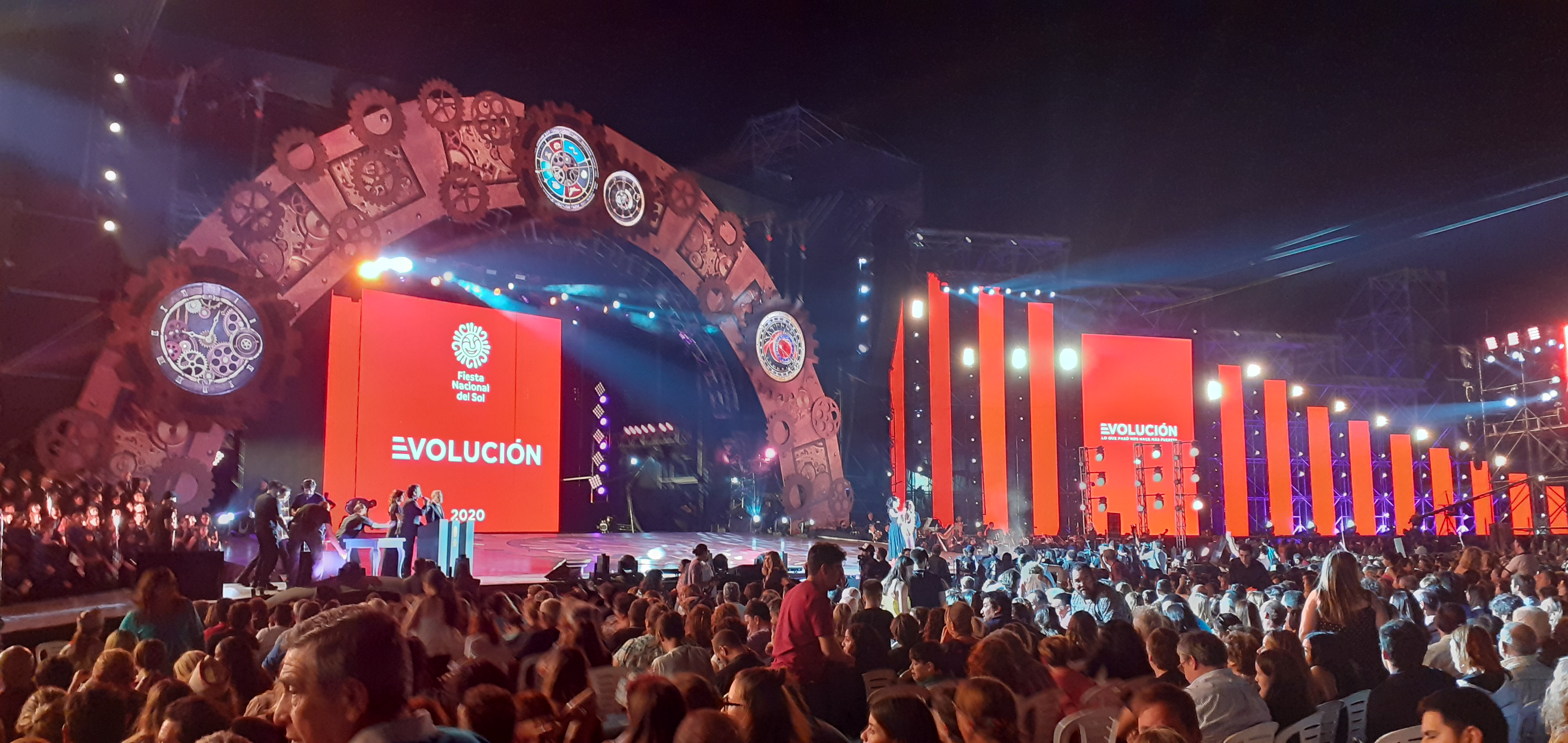
Final show of the 2020 Festival.

The National Day of the Sun (Fiesta Nacional del Sol in Spanish) is an annual celebration of nature that takes place in the City of San Juan and other locations in the San Juan province, Argentina, usually during the month of February. It gives a sample itinerary of economic activities, customs, characters and historical events of the province. It also highlights include a beauty contest, which elects the National Queen of the Sun and the Sun Virreina, candidates representing each of the nineteen departments of the province. The queen is chosen, and eventually Virreina, representing the province for one year, attending to other provincial and national holidays as well as tourism fairs and events to promote the province.

== History ==
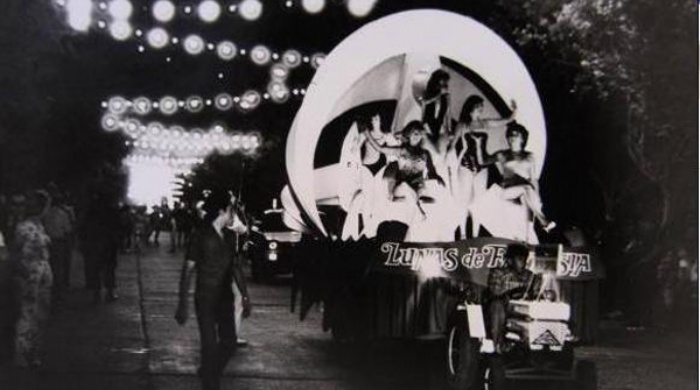
Carriage of the festival in 1972.

The first Fiesta del Sol was held in 1972. It was devised by the Director of Tourism of the Province of San Juan, Guillermo Barrena Guzmán. In 1993, by resolution of the Secretaria de Turismo de la Nación, the festival it became a nationalbecoming the "National Day of the Sun.

== Schedule ==
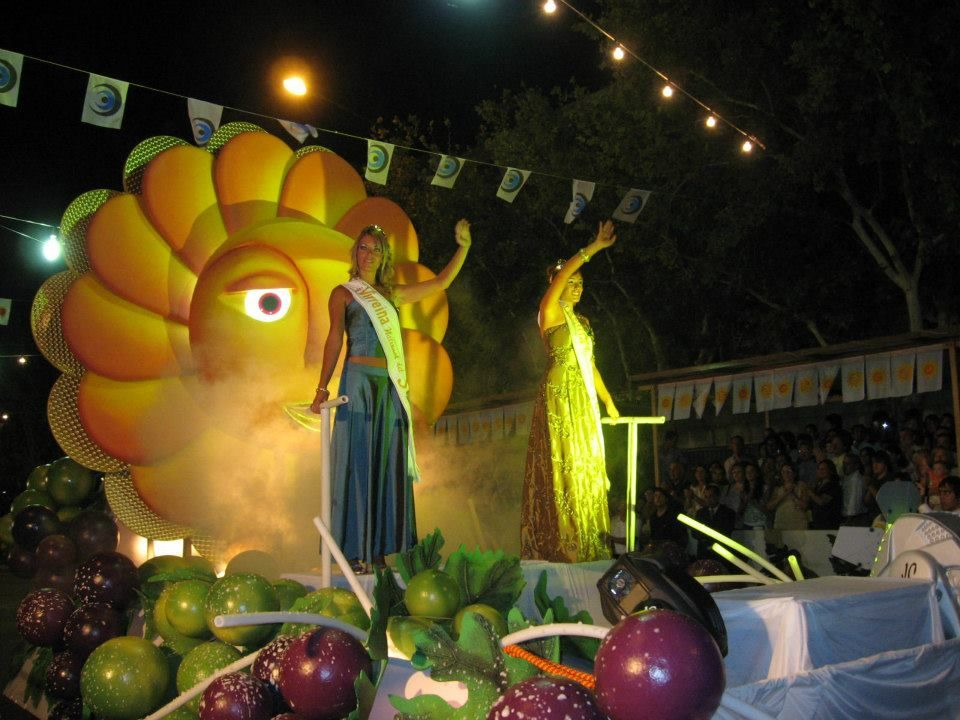
National Queens' Carriage in 2007.

La Fiesta Nacional del Sol, is carried out on different days and locations of the province. Normally extends over five days with exhibitions, fairs, parades and floats, and so on.

=== Gastronomy Fair ===
The gastronomic fair runs over three days, is done within the boundaries of the fair City of San Juan, located on the ground of the former railway station Belgrano. There are exhibition stand of agricultural and industrial enterprises provincial and national departments of tourism and performance of music bands every night, at national and provincial level.

=== Carrusel del Sol ===
The carousel of the sun, is a parade in which each department of the province introduced the floats decorated with motifs of landscapes, economic potential, legends, customs and characters of each region. Besides the carriages parade in Queens that department in this way show their beauty with a view to future national election of the queen of the sun and flowing through the central streets of the city.

This event is followed by nearly 100,000 spectators who are located at the edges of streets and sidewalks and they were presented with gifts that are thrown from the floats, such as fruit or some present.

The departments participating in the parade of the carousel from the sun are:

- Albardón Department
- Angaco Department
- Calingasta Department
- Capital Department
- Caucete Department
- Chimbas Department
- Iglesia Department
- Jachal Department
- Nueve de Julio Department
- Pocito Department
- Rawson Department
- Rivadavia Department
- San Martin Department
- Santa Lucia Department
- Sarmiento Department
- Ullum Department
- Valle Fértil Department
- Veinticinco de Mayo Department
- Zonda Department

=== Final show ===
This event is an impressive show of light and sound, with between 800 and 1000 artists on stage. Both the libretto and the staging of the event are always based in San Juan, emphasizing wine, the main economic activity, as well as the customs and historical events of the province.

At the end, or at the beginning as the protocol is the election of the Queen, who is crowned Queen Outgoing. The show ends with an impressive fireworks display, which for nearly 40 minutes with dancing and music.
