= Nueve de Julio Department, San Juan =

Coordinates: 31°37′S 68°23′W

Nueve de Julio Departamento Nueve de Julio
- Department
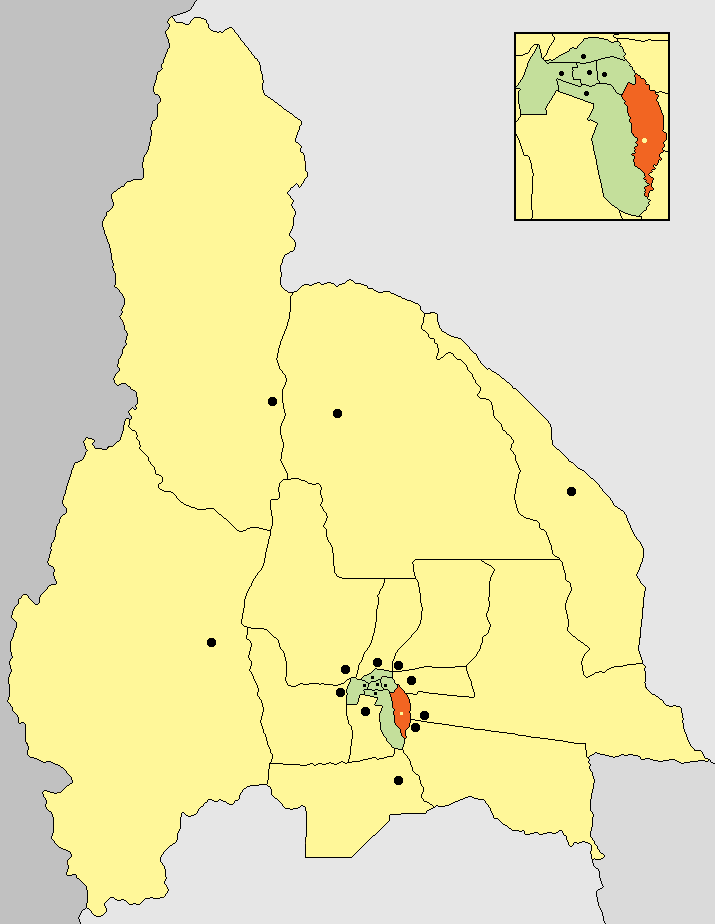
- location of Nueve de Julio Department in San Juan Province
- Country: Argentina
- Established: 1942
- Seat: Nueve de Julio

Government
  - Intendant: Eduardo Daniel Banega

Area
  - Total: 185 km^{2} (71 sq mi)

Population
  - Total: 9,307
  - Density: 50.3/km^{2} (130/sq mi)
- Postal Code: J5417
- IFAM: SJU008
- Area Code: 0264

Nueve de Julio is a department of Argentina, located in the south-center of the province of San Juan. Lying within the Tulum Valley (es:Valle del Tulúm) agricultural oasis, almost 80% of the department's area is cultivated; it is known in particular for its production of wine and its fruit and vegetable crops.

== Toponymy ==
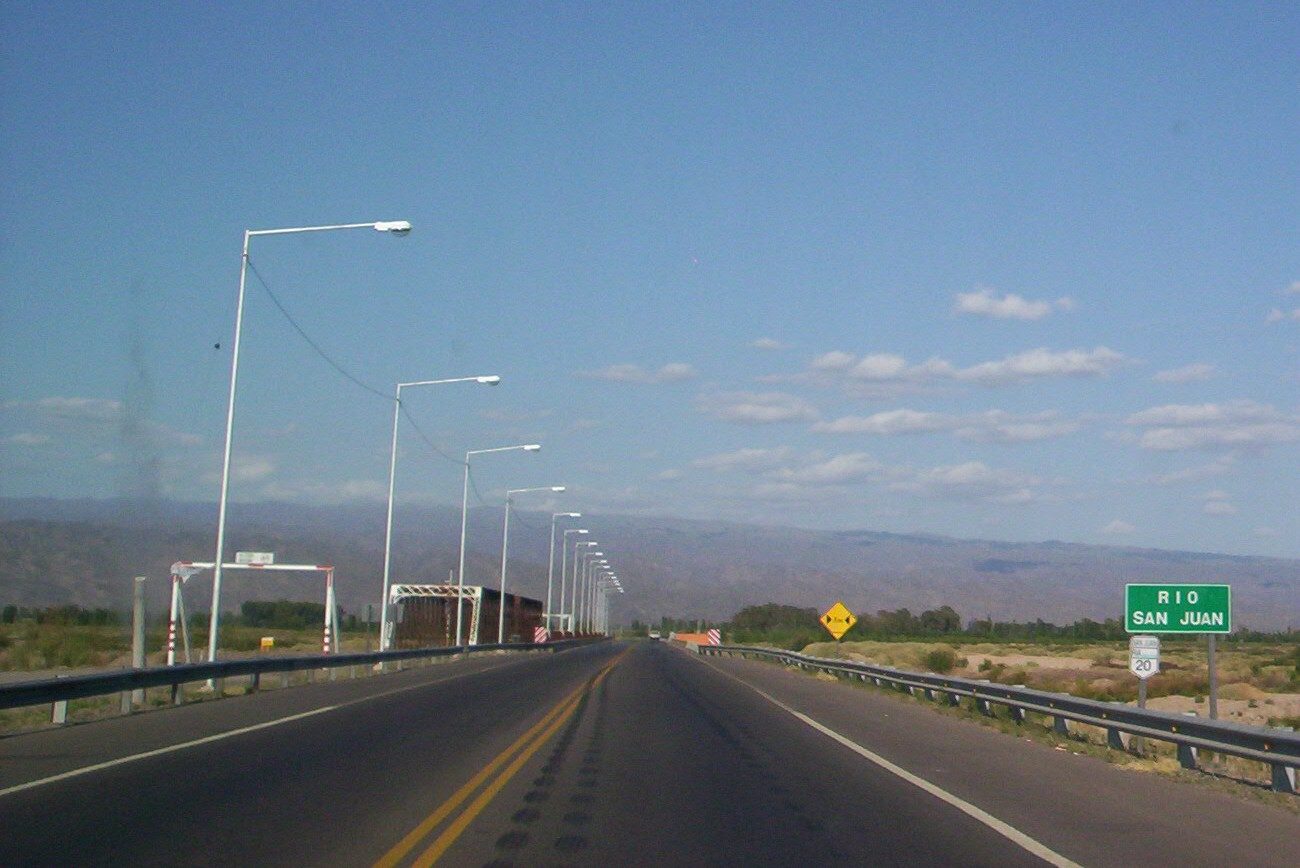
National Route 20

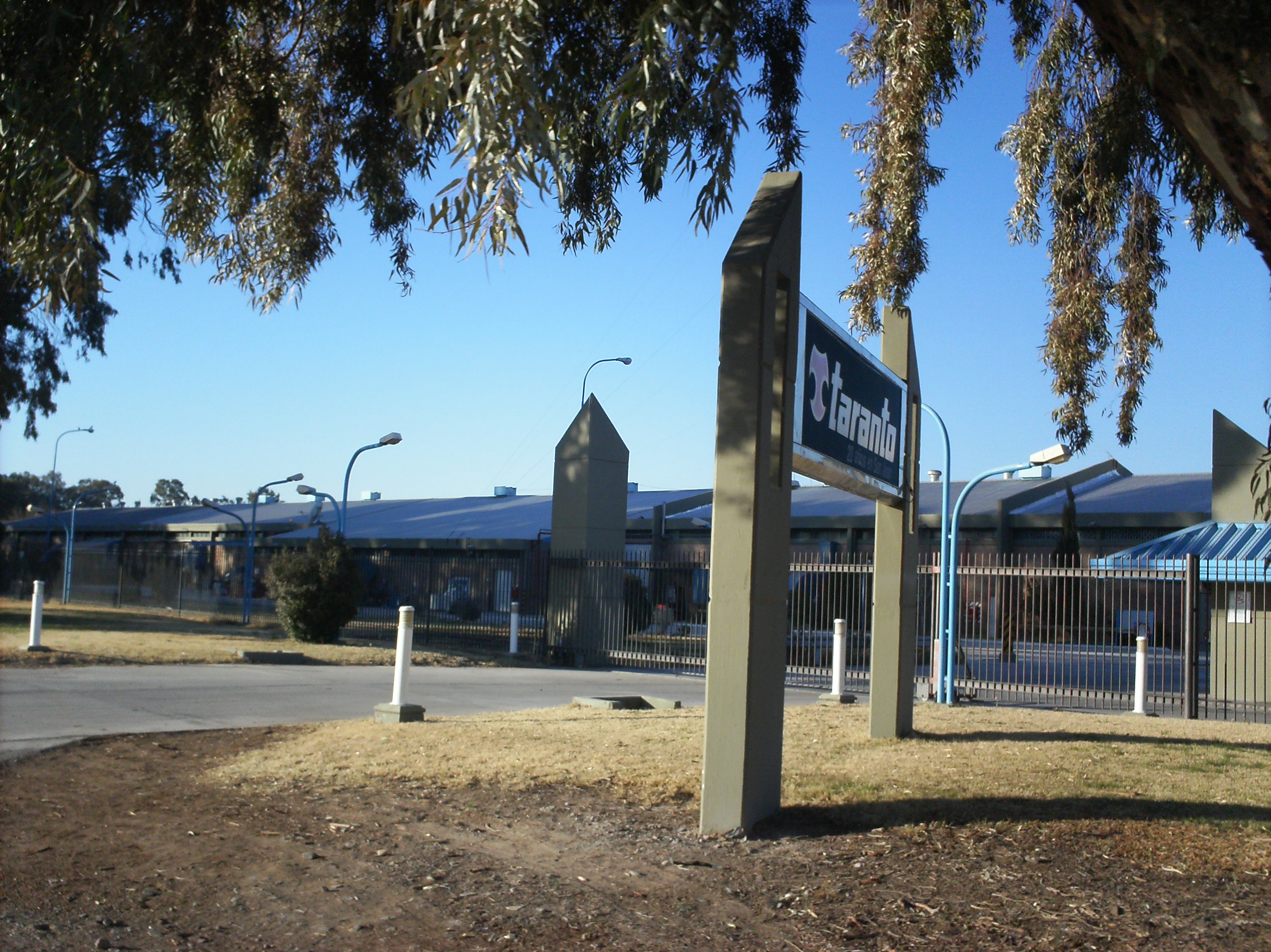
Entrance to the "Taranto" vehicle parts factory, the Department's largest industrial plant.

The department is named for its chief town, Nueve de Julio, which itself was named for the date of Argentina's declaration of independence on July 9, 1816.

== History ==
The earliest inhabitants of the area were the Huarpes, who lived by agriculture, hunting, and fishing in the San Juan River. The Spanish arrived in the area in 1562. The sparsely populated territory became part of the Santa Lucía Department in 1869. As part of a reorganisation within the province in 1913, a municipality of Nueve de Julio was created, which took in the localities of Las Chacritas and Rincón Cercado. Then in 1928 some of the municipalities were abolished, including Nueve de Julio, which was incorporated in Pocito Department. This step was reversed in 1942, when Nueve de Julio became one of the 19 departments of the province, within its present boundaries. Villa Nueve de Julio, Tierra Adentro, Las Majaditas and Las Chacritas are among the districts included within the department.

For religious purposes the department fell within the Santa Lucía parish until 1992, when Nuestra Señora del Rosario was chosen as the department's own patron saint.

== Geography ==
The Nueve de Julio Department is located in south central San Juan Province, about 15 km (9.3 mi) east of the city of San Juan. It has an area of 185 km^{2} (71 sq mi).

Adjacent departments are:

- To the north: Santa Lucía and San Martín
- To the south: 25 de Mayo and Rawson
- To the east: Caucete and 25 de Mayo
- To the west: Rawson

Nueve de Julio is one of the departments comprising the Tulum Valley, a space enclosed to the east by the San Juan River and to the west by the Agua Negra creek. This valley forms a plain sloping gradually down to the east, comprising oasis areas watered by rivers as well as desert areas which are more predominant in the south of the department.

The climate is continental, bringing very hot summers with temperatures up to 40 °C, and cold to moderate winters with sub-zero temperatures. Rainfall is scarce, and summer hailstorms have an adverse effect on agriculture. Notable winds are the zonda – a hot and dry wind from the west – and a cold and damp south wind.

The flora is characterized by xerophytic vegetation, such as the jarilla bush and the retamos, although the totora and other types of reed are also found. Bird life includes herons, gallaretas and moorhens. The coypu, an aquatic mammal, is found near the San Juan River. There are also many insects.

== Economy ==
The main economic activity of this department is agricultural, with a cultivated area of 4,343 hectares, devoted mainly to grapevines, olive trees, vegetables such as tomatoes and onions, fruit (melon, plum, quince), forestry, grains and forage crops. Winemaking is a leading industry, and one large factory produces vehicle parts and polyethylene.

== Population ==
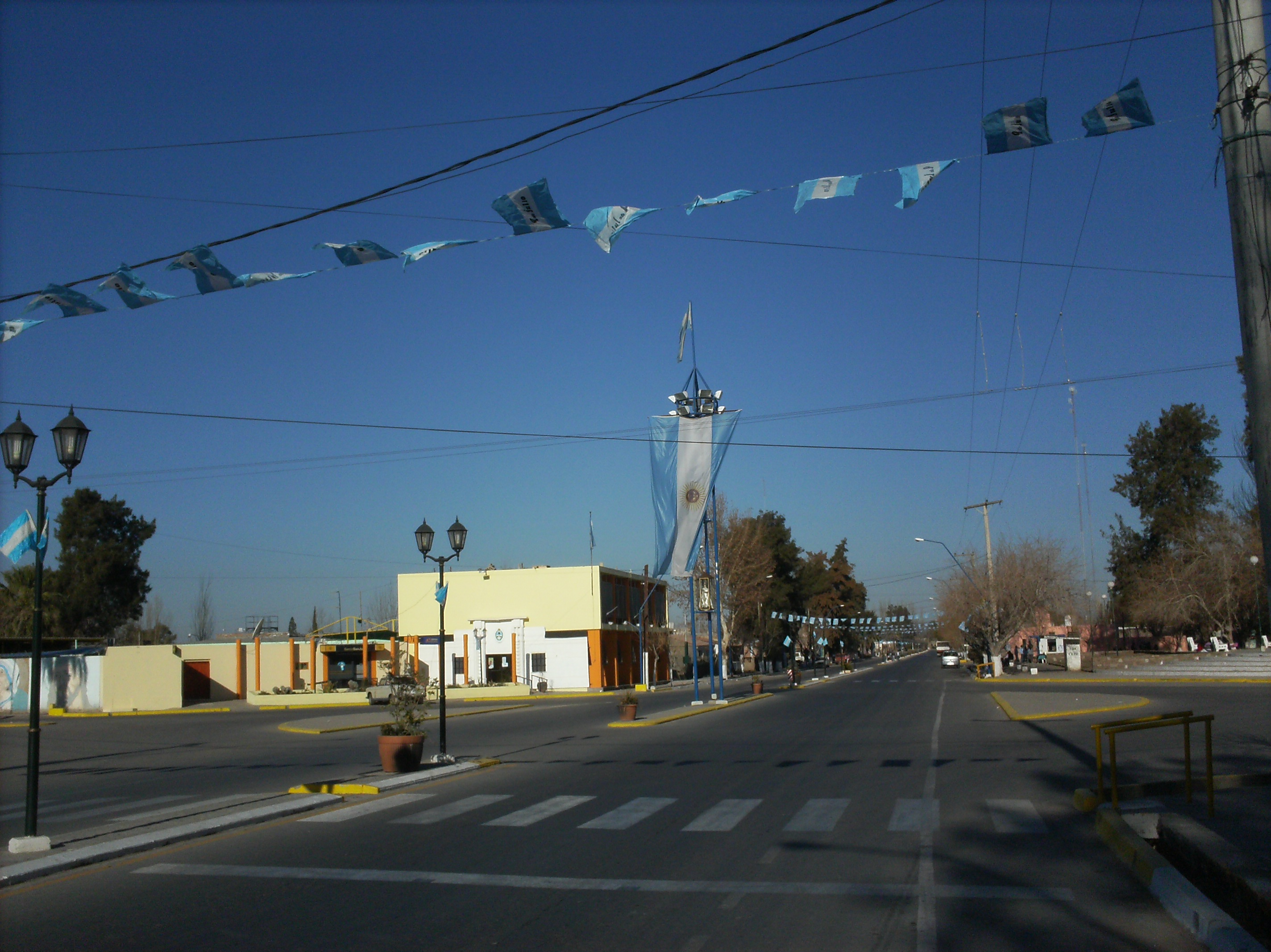
The municipal offices in the town of 9 de Julio.

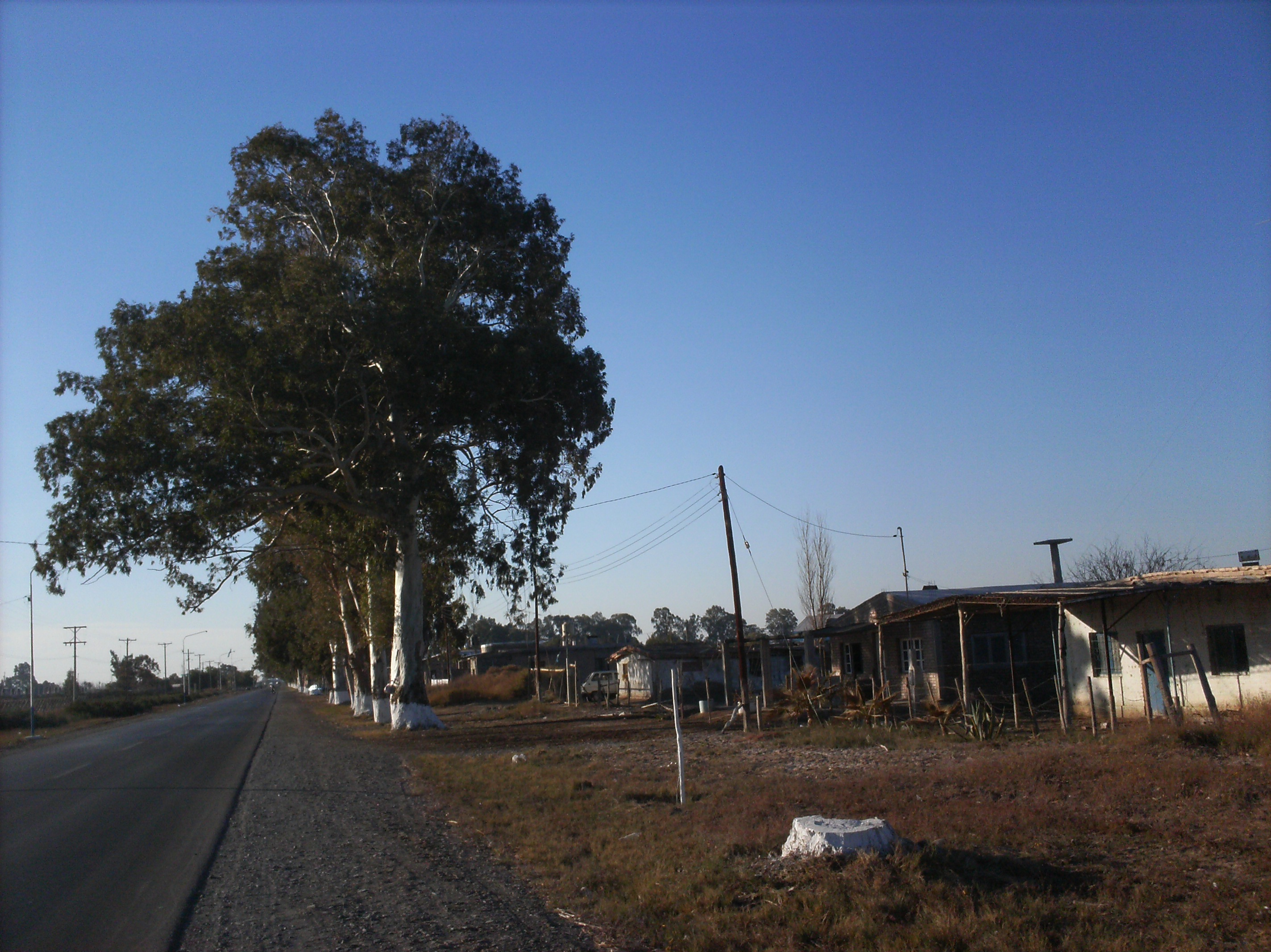
Dwellings on Ruta Provincial 155 (Calle Zapata) near Las Chacritas.

Nueve de Julio is among the least populous of the departments in San Juan province, with only 9,307 inhabitants (2010 Census of Argentina). The majority are rural dwellers, and the urban minority are concentrated in the main town, also called Nueve de Julio; here many new dwellings have been built, some for use as holiday homes, but the town retains a rural atmosphere due to the various agricultural activities that are carried on. Las Chacritas, the second most populated locality, attracts residents by its proximity to a main route between San Juan city and Buenos Aires.

The main localities are provided with electricity and drinking water. However, there has been only limited development of business premises. All levels of education, except for university, are available in Nueve de Julio.

== Seismic activity ==
Earthquakes have occurred in areas adjacent to Nueve de Julio department, notably the 1944 and 1977 San Juan earthquakes.
