= Walberto Allende =

Argentine politician (born 1955)

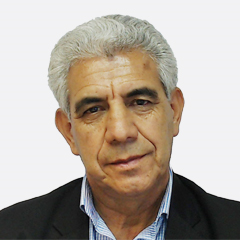

National Deputy
- Incumbent
- Assumed office 10 December 2017
- Constituency: San Juan

Minister of Human Development of San Juan
- In office 10 December 2015 – 10 December 2017
- Governor: Sergio Uñac
- Preceded by: Daniel Molina
- Succeeded by: Armando Sánchez

Mayor of Nueve de Julio
- In office 10 December 2011 – 10 December 2015
- Preceded by: Hugo Nallib Uzair Farías
- Succeeded by: Gustavo Núñez

Personal details
- Born: 9 June 1955 (age 70) San Juan, Argentina
- Party: Justicialist Party
- Other political affiliations: Frente de Todos (2019–present)

Walberto Enrique Allende (born 9 June 1955) is an Argentine politician, currently serving as a National Deputy elected in San Juan Province since 2017. He belongs to the Justicialist Party. Allende was first elected in 2017 and re-elected in 2021. He previously served as Minister of Human Development of San Juan in the administration of Governor Sergio Uñac from 2015 to 2017, and as intendente (mayor) of Nueve de Julio from 2011 to 2015.

== Early and personal life ==
Allende was born on 9 June 1955 in San Juan, Argentina. He is married and has two children.

== Political career ==
Allende's political career began in the municipality of Nueve de Julio, where he worked as an administrative worker. He would later serve as a member of the town's council from 1995 to 1999. During the governorship of José Luis Gioja, Allende was director of social emergency in the Ministry of Human Development. Later, from 2011 to 2015, he was mayor of Nueve de Julio. In 2015, upon the election of Sergio Uñac as governor of San Juan, Allende was appointed as the province's Minister of Human Development.

=== National deputy ===
In the 2017 legislative election, Allende ran for one of San Juan's seats in the National Chamber of Deputies as the first candidate on the "Frente Todos" list, followed by Sandra Daniela Castro. With 53.68% of the vote, the list received enough votes for both Allende and Castro to be elected. He originally formed part of the "Argentina Federal" parliamentary bloc. Following the 2019 general election, Allende joined the Frente de Todos (FDT) alongside most other members of the Justicialist Party, and sat in the FDT bloc in the Chamber.

Allende ran for re-election in the 2021 legislative election. He was the first candidate in the Frente de Todos list, followed by Fabiola Aubone. With 43.58% of the vote, Allende and Aubone's list received just enough votes for both candidates to be elected.

As a national deputy, Allende formed part of the parliamentary commissions on Addiction Prevention, Population and Human Development, Finances, Families and Childhood, Consumer Rights, Mining, and Commerce. He was an opponent of the legalisation of abortion in Argentina, voting against the two Voluntary Interruption of Pregnancy bills debated by the Argentine Congress in 2018 and 2020.
