= Veinticinco de Mayo Department, San Juan =

25 DE MAYO Departamento 25 de Mayo
- Department
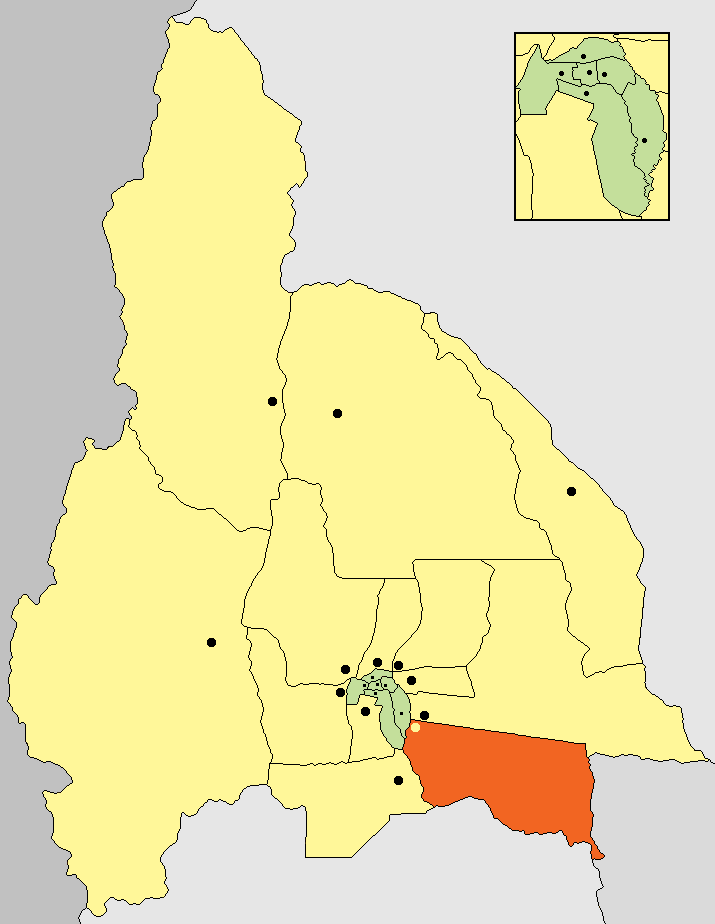
- location of Departamento 25 de Mayo in San Juan Province
- Coordinates: 31°49′S 68°12′W
- Country: Argentina
- Seat: Santa Rosa

Government
  - Intendant: Rodolfo Jalife

Area
  - Total: 4.519 km^{2} (1.745 sq mi)

Population (2001 census [INDEC])
  - Total: 15,193
  - Density: 3,362/km^{2} (8,708/sq mi)
- Postal Code: 5400
- IFAM: SJU018
- Area Code: 0264
- Patron saint: Santa Rosa

25 de Mayo is a department in the San Juan Province in Argentina, located southeast of the province. The department is characterized by its high production of wine and olivícola.

== Geography ==
The department is located in the southeastern province of San Juan, distanced 32 kilometres east of city of San Juan. It borders:

- To the north with Caucete Departament
- To the south with Mendoza Province
- To the east with the departments of Sarmiento, Rawson and 9 de Julio Departments
- To the west with San Luis Province
- Relief

The geography of the department is characterized by mountains of escaza height, which belong to the system of Sierras Pampeanas. Also displayed numerous depressions that give rise to Medanos large area, basins filled with river deposits (water) and wind (wind). The dunes are located between the districts of Vallecito and Encón, and with an area of 250,000 hectares, are among the largest in South America. It also highlights the drains and rivers Bermejo Desaguadero River, giving rise to small swamps, (Lagoons Guanacache), in the southern province of limiting the Mendoza

- Climate

The climate is characterized by high aridity, with high temperatures in the summer of 35 °C, when the absolute reach 45 °C, low rainfall and a large thermal daily. The flora comprises jarillas, casuarinas, challenge, acacia, chilcas, chañares, zampas and jumes. The animals inhabiting the region are hares, vizcachas, gangs, foxes, reptiles, peccaries, coipos and waterfowl.

== Population ==
According to Indec 2001 May 25 the department had 15,193 inhabitants of which 51% of the population is urban-type, 49% are rural conditions. Santa Rosa (department head) and Casuarinas are the major urban centres that concentrate the most densely populated. In rural landscapes, with fewer poiblación, in addition to engaging in agricultural activity, stressing the development of a variety of crafts as a means of expression and livelihood. Textiles, leather works and objects made with jonquil (a plant typical of the region) are the pieces sold.

== Economy ==
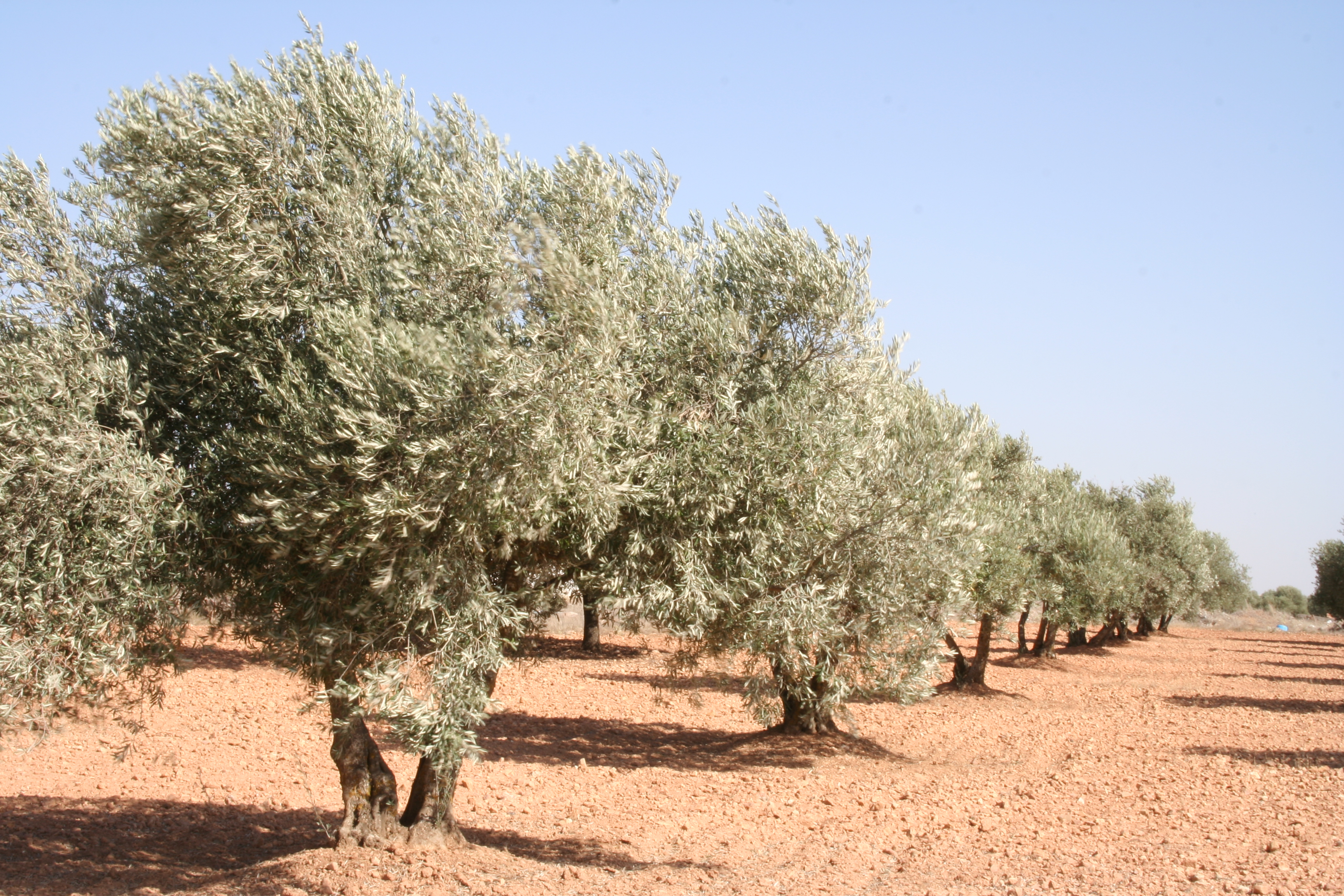
olive plantations

The main economic activity is the agricultural and the department has more than 16,141 hectares under cultivation, being one of the largest cultivated areas of the province. 55% of this total is occupied by at and 37% by plantations olive.

The fruit, melon watermelon pear quince Damascus and peach, seeds and pastures are other crops that are made in the department to provide the remaining percentage. It also made holdings forest. It also highlights the livestock, and goats and bovine the most important thing in the area.

As for the industry stands of wine, with many wineries that produce wines called common or table, which supply the province and some parts of the country. Also highlighted olivícola production with the development of one of the best olive oil of the province and the country.
