= General San Martín, San Juan =

General San Martín
- City
- Location within Argentina
- Coordinates: 31°26′23″S 68°31′14″W
- Country: Argentina
- Province: San Juan
- Department: Albardón
- Established: January 24, 1866
- Elevation: 615 m (2,018 ft)

Population (2010 Census)
  - Total: 22,046
- Time zone: ART
  - Summer (DST): −3
- Climate: Dfc

General San Martín is a city and the capital of the Albardón Department of San Juan Province, Argentina.
