= Rivadavia, San Juan =

Rivadavia
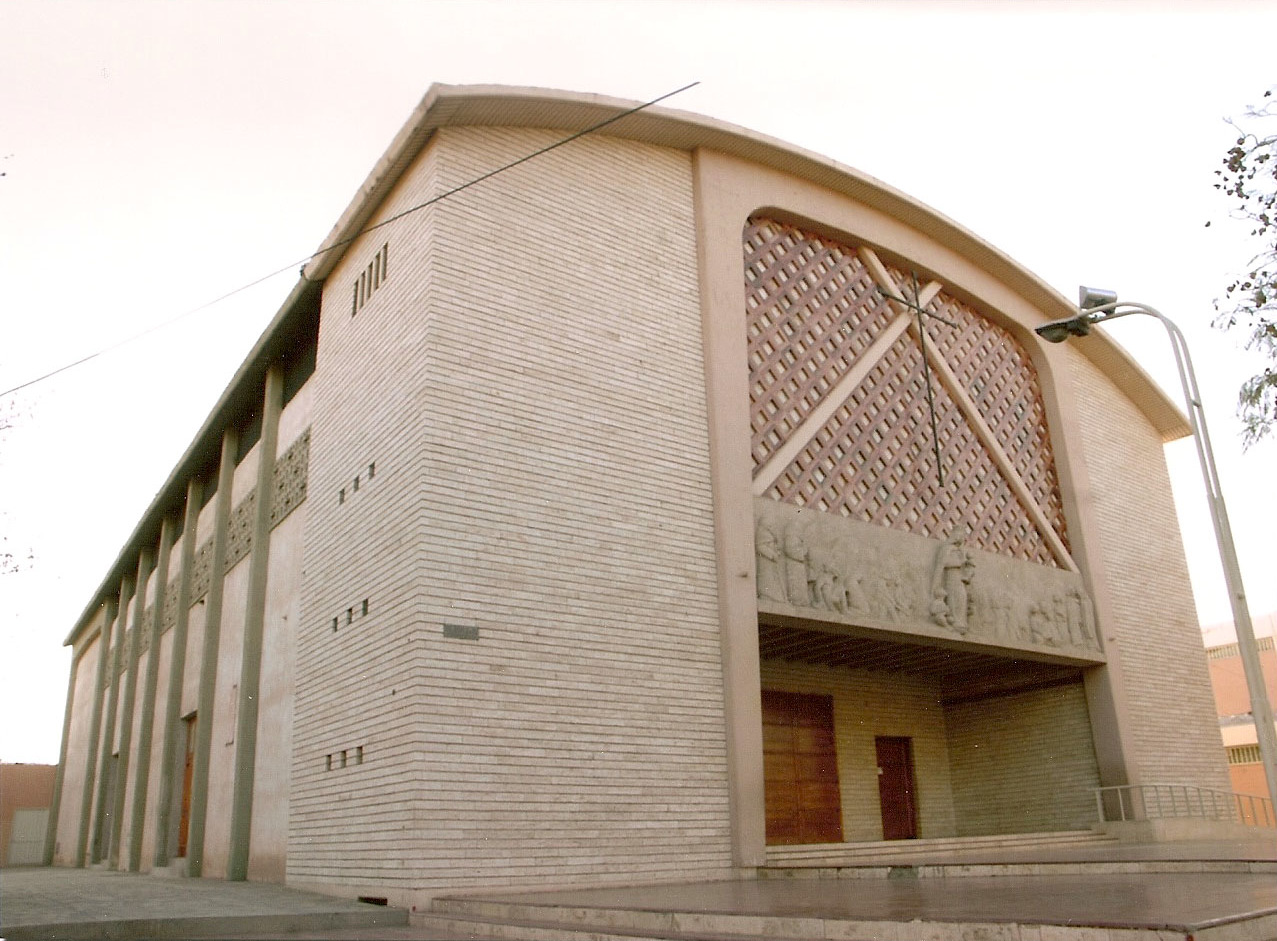
- Basílica Nuestra Señora de los Desamparados

- Location within San Juan Province Location within Argentina
- Coordinates: 31°31′49″S 68°35′41″W
- Country: Argentina
- Province: San Juan
- Department: Rivadavia Department
- Elevation: 728 m (2,388 ft)

Population (2010)
  - Total: 82,582
- Time zone: UTC−3 (ART)
- Postal code: J5407
- Area code: +54 264
- Climate: BSh

Rivadavia, known officially as Ciudad de Rivadavia, is a city and the capital of the eponymous Rivadavia Department, in south-central San Juan Province, northwest of the Tulum Oasis, in the west-central part of Argentina. It is 7 km (4.3 mi) westward from the central part of the city of San Juan, with which it forms a part of the urban agglomeration of Greater San Juan.

Rivadavia, through the approval of Provincial Law No. 6,343 of 8 July 1993, was declared a city as well as its respective limits were established.
