= Rivadavia Department, San Juan =

RIVADAVIA Departamento Rivadavia
- Department
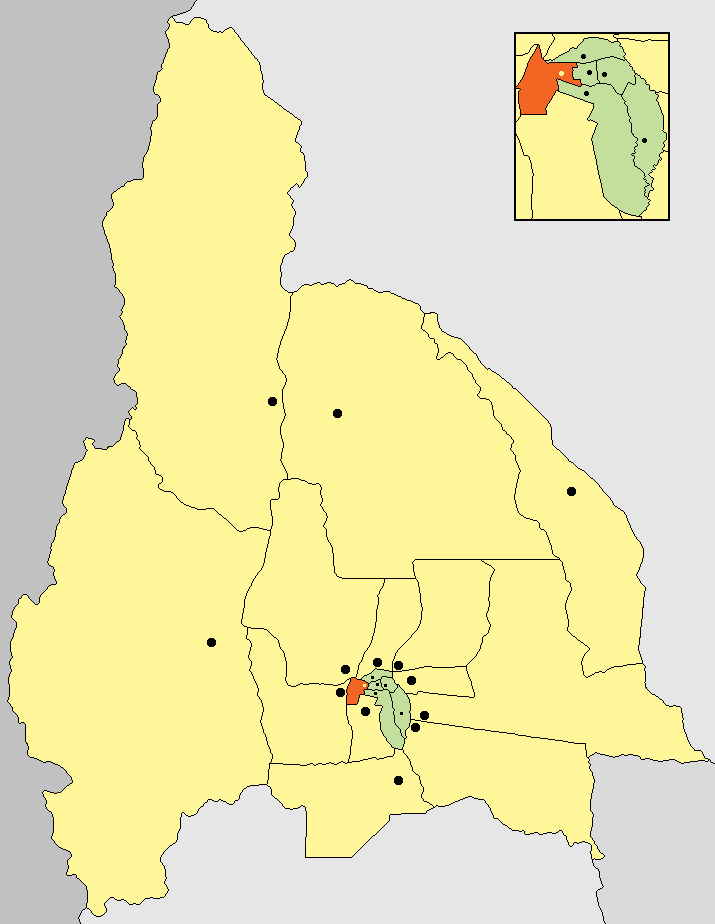
- location of Departamento Rivadavia in San Juan Province
- Coordinates: 31°31′S 68°36′W
- Country: Argentina
- Established: September 19, 1942
- Founder: ?
- Seat: Rivadavia

Government
  - Intendant: Sergio Miodowsky (Production and Labour)

Area
  - Total: 157 km^{2} (61 sq mi)

Population (2001 census [INDEC])
  - Total: 76,150
  - Density: 485/km^{2} (1,260/sq mi)
- Demonym: rivadaviense
- Postal Code: 5400
- IFAM: SJU011
- Area Code: 0264
- Patron saint: Virgen de los Desamparados
- Website: www.municipioderivadavia.gov.ar

Rivadavia is a department of the province of San Juan (Argentina). Located in the central southern part of Argentina, in the northeast section of the Valle del Tulum The city of San Juan is located in the west of this region, which is part of the conurbation, Grand San Juan. It is the capital city of the department of the same name, and is the government seat. It has various municipal edifices, including the police headquarters, and an important hospital, Marcial Quiroga.

== History ==
The municipal law of December 7, 1869, divided the province into 18 departments. One covering the current areas Marquisate (current district department), Zonda and Ullum. These zones cover a substantial area, which responded to the low population in the area.

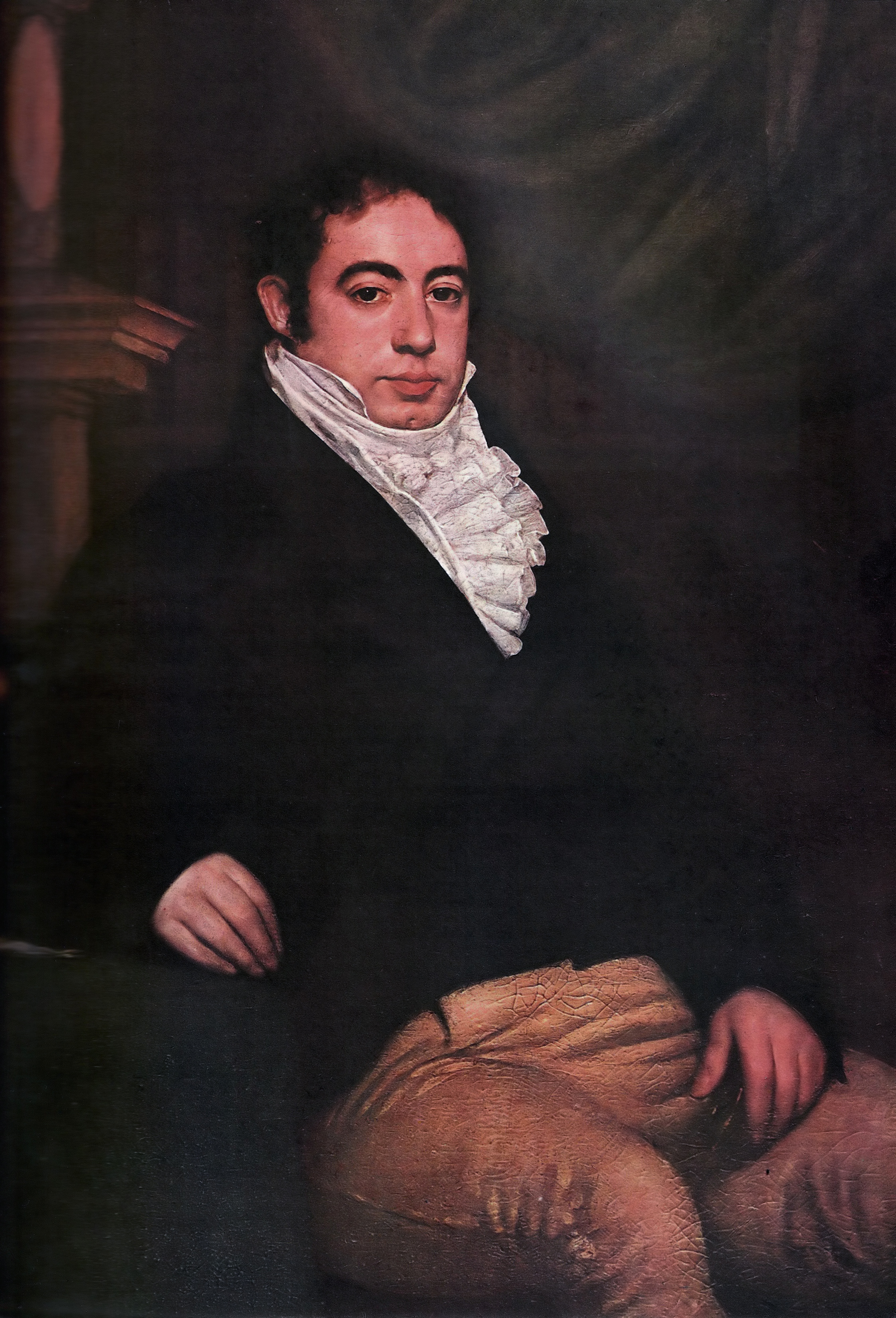
The name of the department to deve político Bernardino Rivadavia

In 1890, the Echezarreta brothers, Nicolas and Agustin, established a central population in the department and therefore presented a draft to the village head in Marquisate, since both brothers were planting vineyards in the Marquesado area and wanted to attract potential employees.

The project, which defined the layout of the village on a main road with an area of 60 hectares, was approved. The sale of plots was more than successful, and a year later the town had become a tourist attraction for the province. The population began to grow by leaps and bounds. The brothers Echezarreta also donated their vast fields properties to institutions such as Bethany House, an establishment where retreats are held at present, and partly to Regiment Mountain Infantry number 22.

At the beginning of the century, under the governance of Colonel Carlos Sarmiento, the town was legally named Rivadavia on August 25, 1908. In 1909, the executive branch authorized the creation of a villa in the department for the seat of municipal authorities, expropriating the required land. In 1928 a new law was enacted by the Municipal Regime, which included Rivadavia within the department capital. On March 7, 1935, during Juan Maurín's term of office, new legislation on the subject reappeared independently.

On September 19, 1942, Rivadavia became one of the 19 department of the province, with the village of the same name and with the current limits

== Geography ==
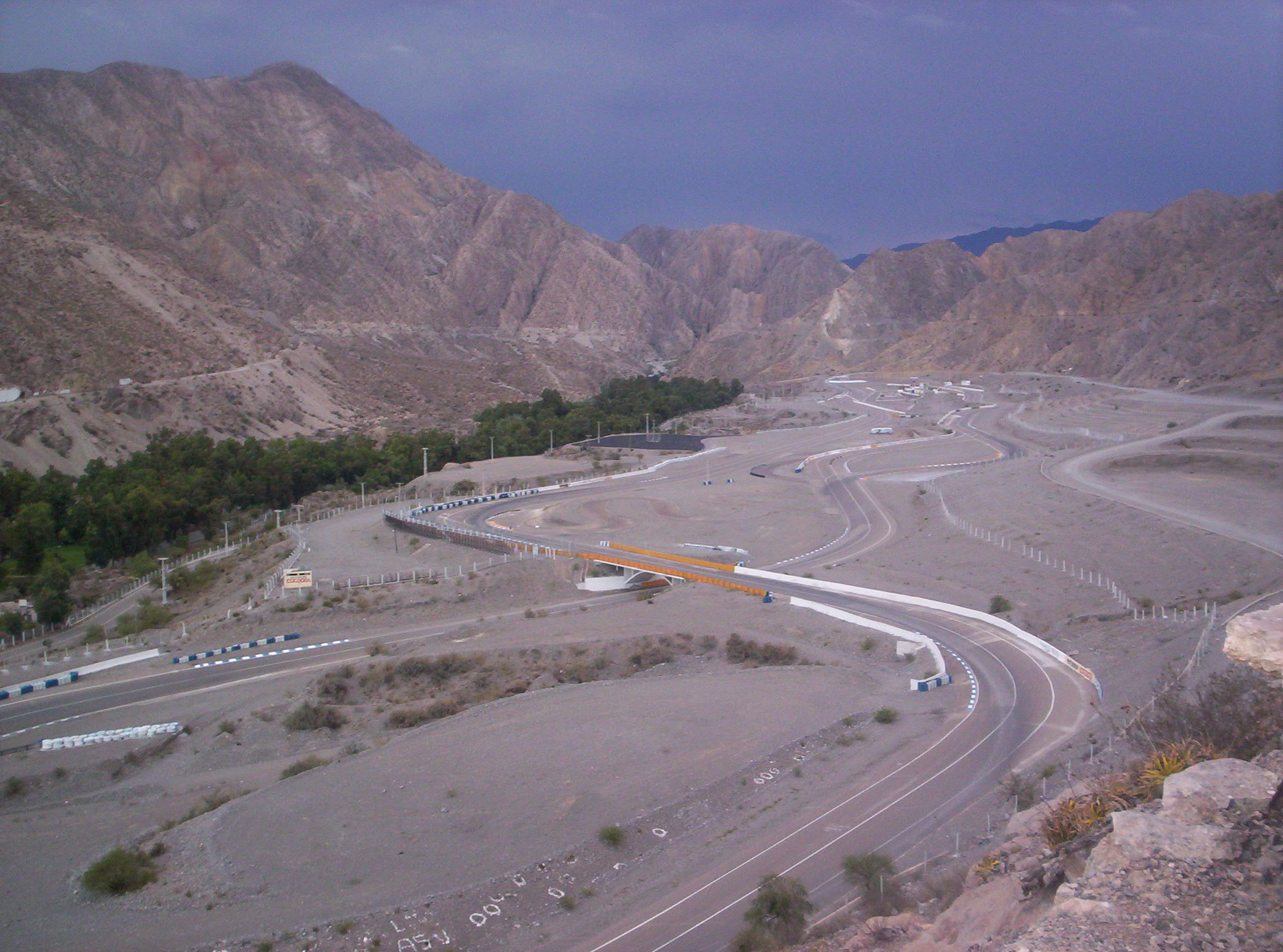
View of the Qubrada Zonda and the Autódromo El Zonda - Eduardo Copello

The Rivadavia department is located in south central province of San Juan, in the so-called Valley Tulum, six kilometers west of the City of San Juan, covers an area of 157 km ², making it one of the smaller departments in the province. Its boundaries are:

- North with departments Chimbas and Ullum
- South with Rawson and Pocito
- East with the Capital
- To the west with the Zonda

The department incorporates the Marquisate mountain range in the west, which runs in a north–south direction, which is part of the Sierra Chica de Zonda, northwest San Juan River and a plain, part of the Tulum Valley, in which is concentrated the majority of the population. The farming industry has a very fertile soil with the presence of loess and mud

The weather has higher temperatures than elsewhere in the Valley Tulum, due to the large number of existing building, but which diminish at night. The mountain range affects rainfall.

The flora is represented by jarillas, chañares and zampas. Animal life includes hares, foxes, weasels, reptiles, insects and rodents

== Population ==
According to INDEC in the 2001 census Rivadavia has a population of 76,150 inhabitants, placing it in third place as the most populous department of the province after the Rawson and Capital, integrating well to agglomerate Great San Juan.

Its population is concentrated in the eastern area, where the Rivadavia village is located. The town of Marquisate is separated from this area, the most important department at the population level and because it is the headquarters of Mountain Infantry Regiment 22 "Lieutenant Colonel Juan Manuel Cabot" (popularly known as RIM 22) and the South is the same located the town of "drink" with a large number of villages and settlements emergency.

== Tourism ==
The tourism department is located in the west at the foot of the Zonda creek. There are two routes to the resorts of this department, one of which is Avenida José Ignacio de la Roza, which leads to the F. Cantoni park.

=== Park Federico Cantoni ===
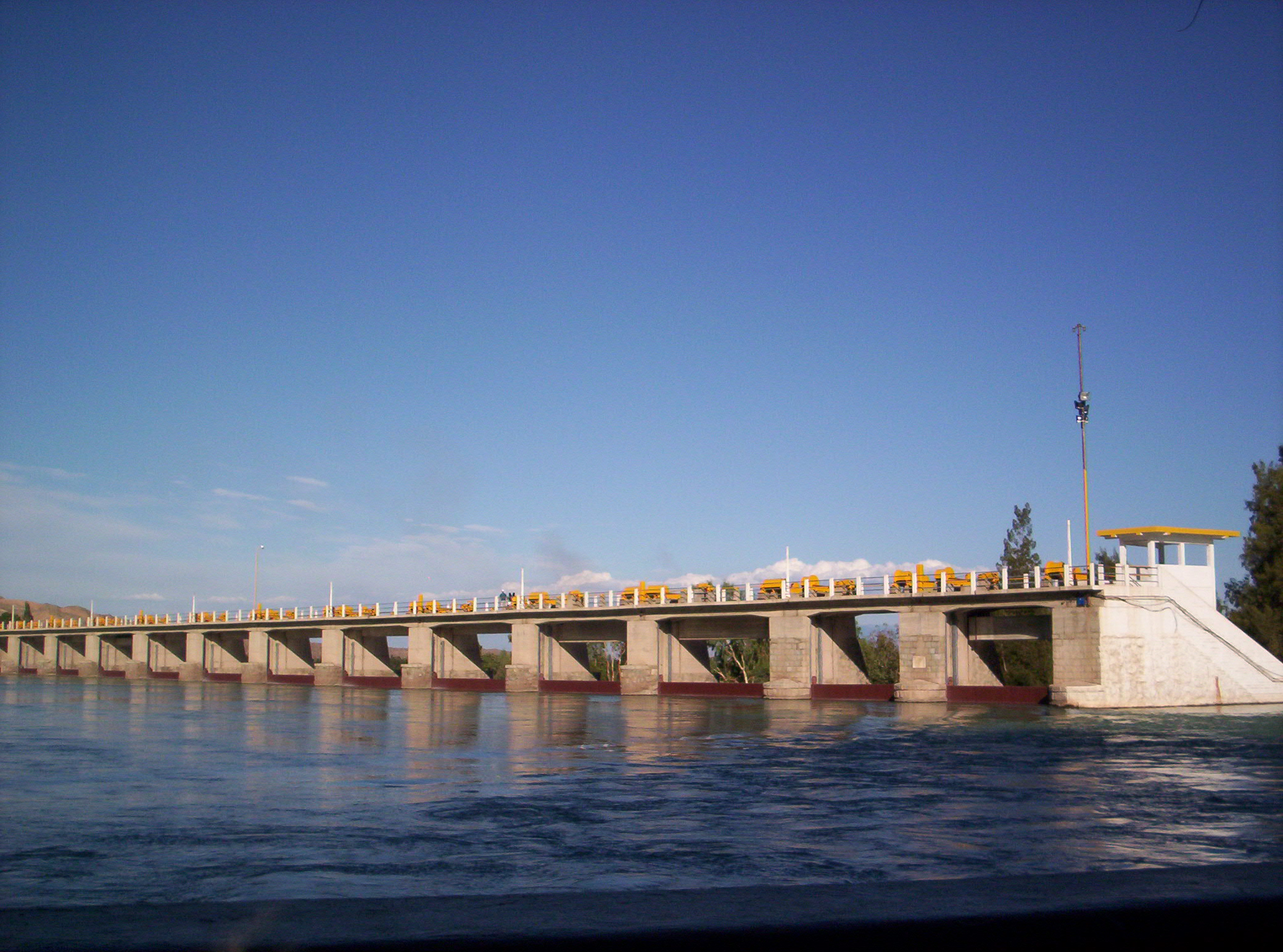
Jose Ignacio de la Roza Dams

It is located at the foot of the Sierra Chica de Zonda, and was inaugurated on September 11, 1932. at the behest of Governor Federico Cantoni, who named it "Park Bernardino Rivadavia." It is built with natural flowers, and regional bushes and trees and is equipped with the following attractions:

- The Garden of the Poets 'was inaugurated on April 11, 1958, was an idea of San Juan resident Ofelia Zuccoli Fidanza, who envisioned the Shield of the Fatherland composed of flowers, shrubs and trees, to be viewed from a natural lookout located at the top of the mountains. There are also sculptures of well-known poets incorporated into the landscape.
- The Speedway "The Zonda - Eduardo Copello "': is located in the Quebrada de Zonda. It was inaugurated on October 8, 1967. It is 2300 meters long, and consists of natural stands in the hills, much admired by sports car racing aficionados as much for the surrounding landscape as for the track itself.
- 'Camping Municipal Rivadavia' is located south of the park on Route 14, which has space for approximately 250 tents, and has electrical outlets, and places with grills and tables, has two pools, one for adults and another for children, and a water slide with two natural waterfalls. There are shops nearby for picnickers. It also has restrooms with drinking water, showers, nursing service and police service. From here you can be hiking through the Gorge Zonda.
- 'Cavas de Zonda' is the only sparkling wine from South America produced with the methods used for champenoise champagne and charmat processes. There are guided tours and a tasting room in which one may purchase the wine. Its interior has a constant temperature of 18 °C.

=== Area San Juan River ===
This area is located in the northwestern part of the department and is accessed by the Avenida San Martin and then the route number 14, this with the following attractions

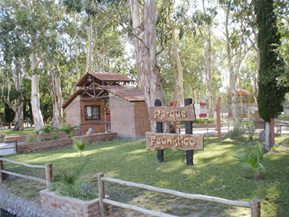
Park Faunístico

- 'Park Faunístico' is a complex with a rustic ambiance, inhabited by indigenous animals, including llamas, pumas, guanacos, snakes and birds, and some exotic species, such as lions. A roundabout is located in the middle of a lake used as a hub to mark the trails.
- 'Camping "El Pinar "' includes a large number of species of pine trees, a spa, facilities and, a reservoir inhabited by various species of fish.
- 'Dike "Jose Ignacio de la Roza "' is a tributary divider of the San Juan River; the majority runs through a significantly larger channel matrix, reaching the smaller San Emiliano. This same divide sends water to the irrigation canals, "Canal Benavides", the "Channel Cespedes" and the "Canal Quiroga," which irrigate the Valley Tulum. The smaller portion of the water flow follows its natural course as a river.

At its edge is a forested campsite.
