= Capital Department, San Juan =

CAPITAL Departamento Capital
- Department
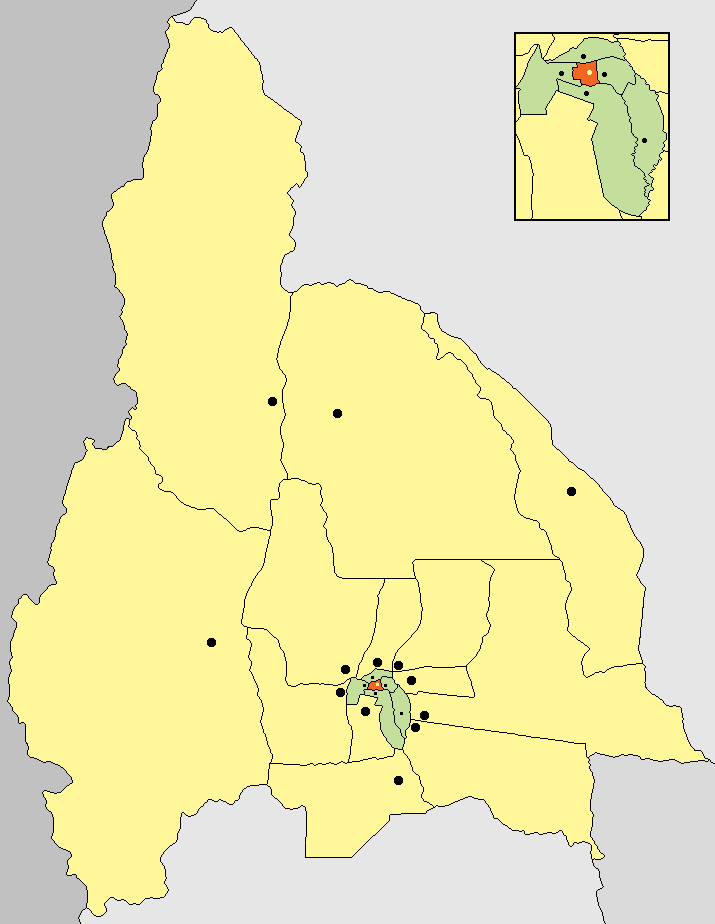
- location of Departamento Capital in San Juan Province
- Coordinates: 31°31′S 68°32′W
- Country: Argentina
- Established: June 13, 1562
- Founder: Juan Jufré
- Seat: San Juan

Government
  - Intendant: Susana Laciar

Area
  - Total: 30 km^{2} (12 sq mi)

Population (2001 census [INDEC])
  - Total: 116,511
  - Density: 3,900/km^{2} (10,000/sq mi)
- Demonym: capitalino/a
- Postal Code: 5400
- IFAM: SJU012
- Area Code: 0264
- Patron saint: San Juan Bautista
- Website: www.municipiosanjuan.gov.ar

Capital is a department in San Juan Province, Argentina.

== Geography ==
The capital of San Juan has an area of 30 km^{2} (12 sq mi). To the north bordering department Chimbas, on the east by Santa Lucía, to the west and south by Rivadavia Rawson. The approximate population of the department of capital is 118,500 inhabitants.

== Population ==
According to estimates from INDEC, the national institute responsible for censuses, it had 116,511 inhabitants in 2005.
