= Caucete =

- City
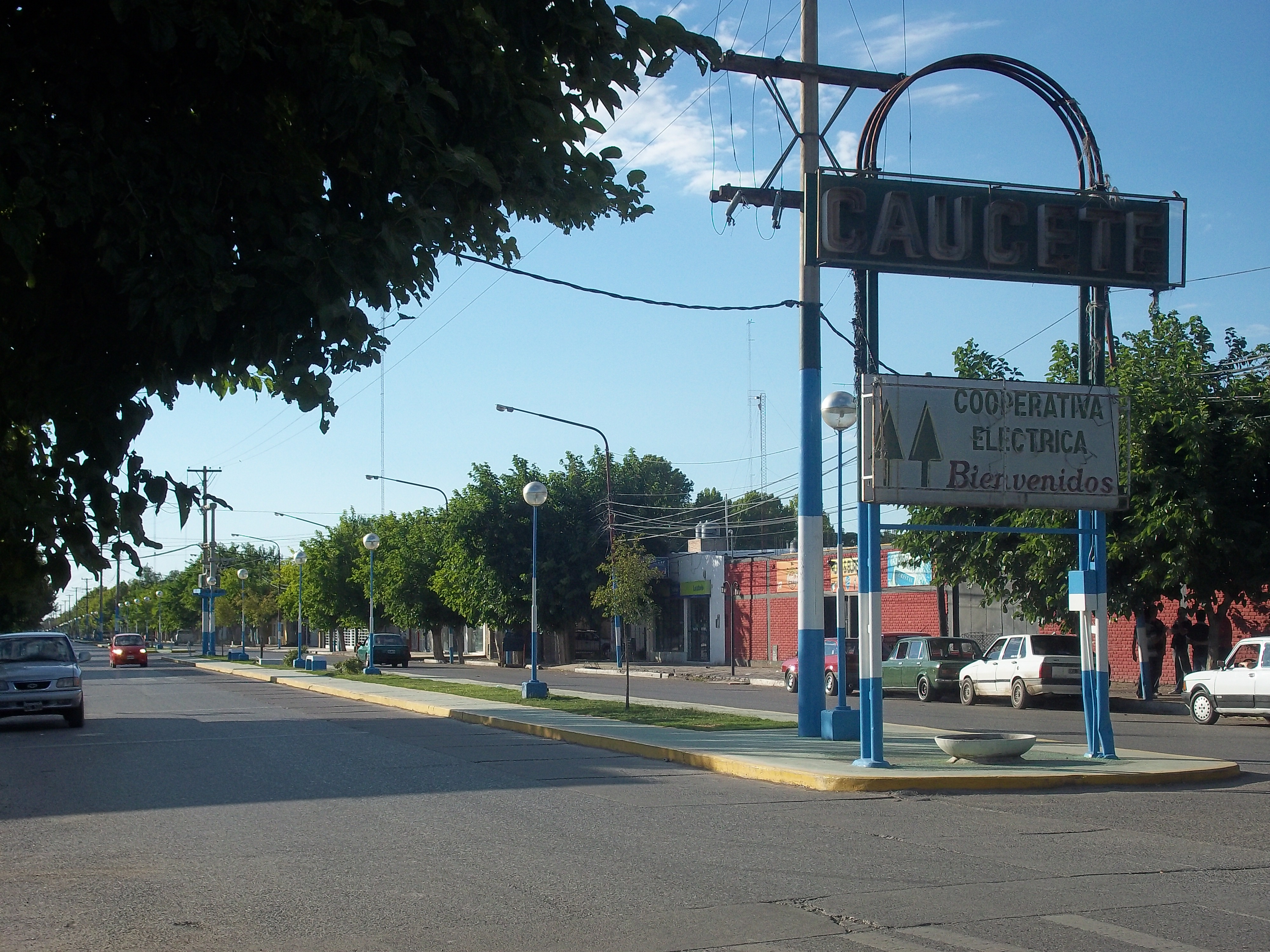

- Location of Caucete in Argentina
- Coordinates: 31°39′S 68°17′W
- Country: Argentina
- Province: San Juan
- Department: Caucete
- Elevation: 570 m (1,870 ft)

Population (2010 census)
  - Total: 28,222
- Time zone: UTC−3 (ART)
- CPA base: J5442
- Dialing code: +54 264

Caucete is a city in the province of San Juan, Argentina, located 25 km southeast of the provincial capital, on the junction of National Routes 20 and 141. It has 33,609 inhabitants as per the 2001 census [INDEC], and is the head town of the Caucete Department.

== See also ==
- 1977 San Juan earthquake
