= Villa Krause =

- City
- Location of Villa Krause in Argentina
- Coordinates: 31.5828035°S 68.5415262°W
- Country: Argentina
- Province: San Juan
- Department: Rawson
- Elevation: 650 m (2,130 ft)

Population (2001 census)
  - Total: 107,778
- CPA base: J5425
- Dialing code: +54 264

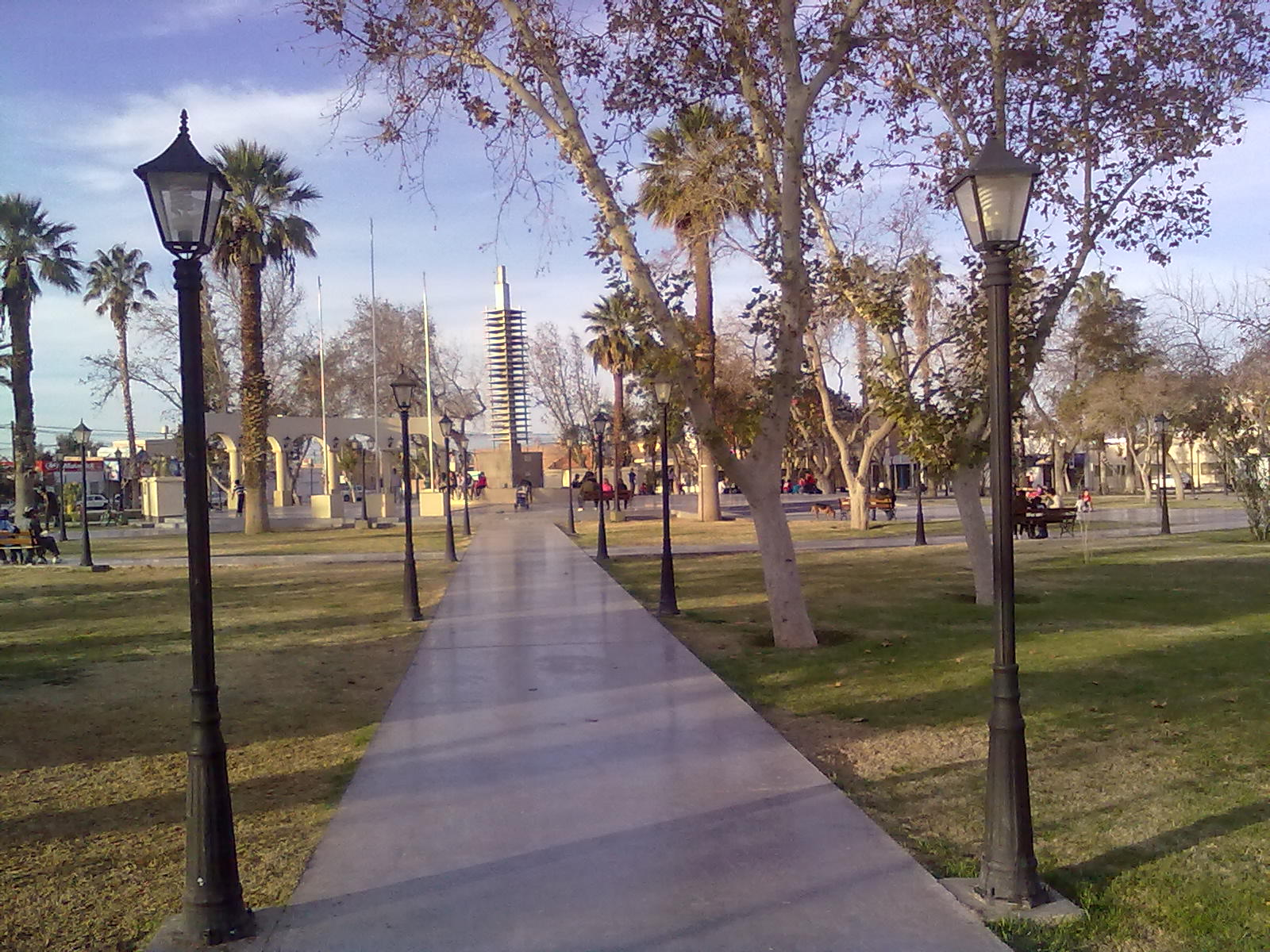
Central plaza of Villa Krause

Villa Krause is a city in the province of San Juan, Argentina in the Cuyo region. The city is located in the Rawson, east of the San Juan River, at 650 m above mean sea level and has a population of around 107,000 according to the 2001 census [INDEC].
