= Nueve de Julio, San Juan =

Nueve de Julio
- Town
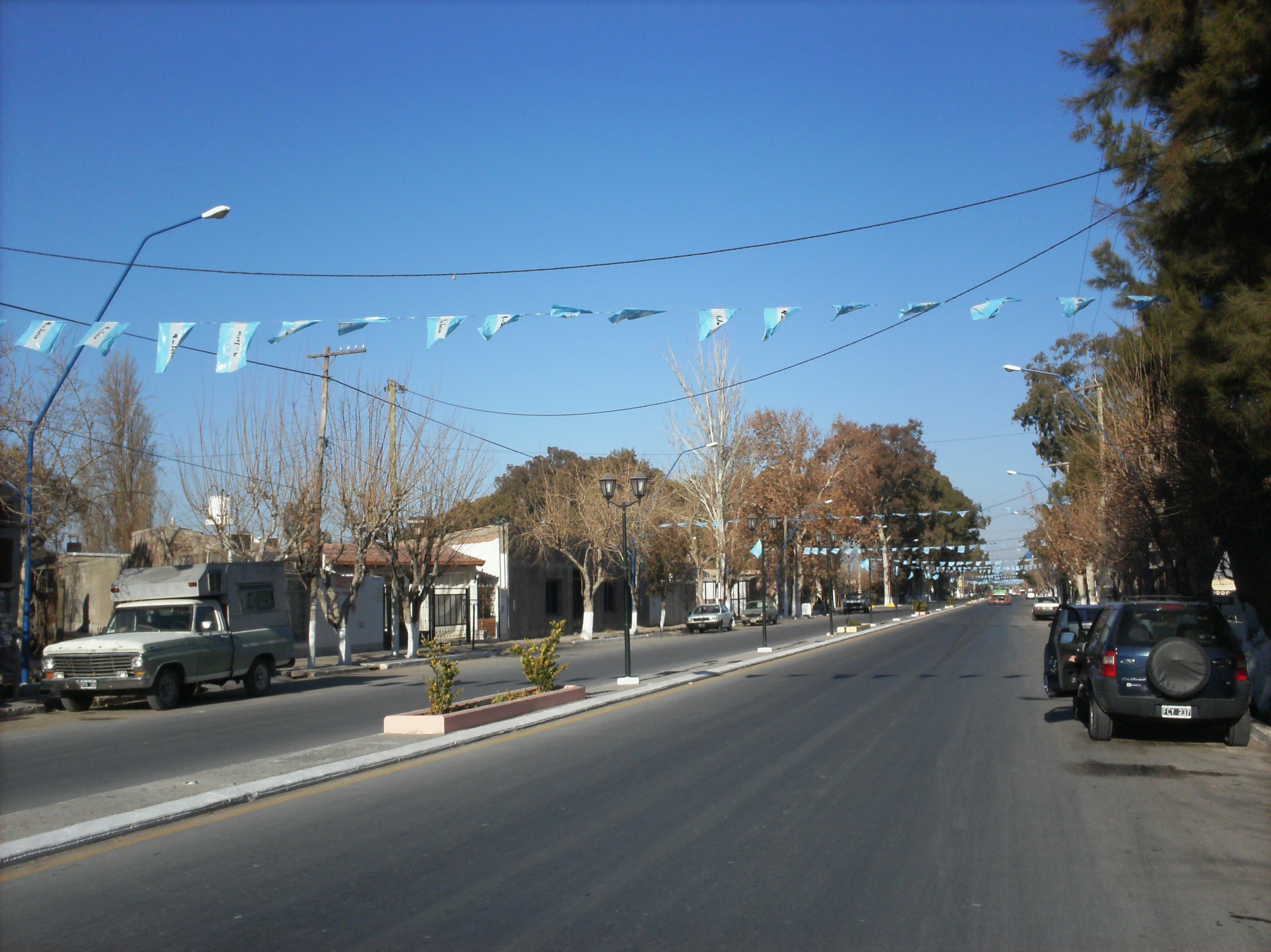

- Location of Nueve de Julio in Argentina
- Coordinates: 31°39′S 68°24′W
- Country: Argentina
- Province: San Juan
- Department: Capital

Population
  - Total: 7,652
- Time zone: UTC−3 (ART)
- CPA base: J5417
- Dialing code: +54 264

Nueve de Julio is a town in the province of San Juan, Argentina. It has 7,652 inhabitants as per the 2001 census [INDEC].
