= San Juan Province, Argentina =

Province of Argentina

San Juan
- Province
- Province of San Juan; Provincia de San Juan (Spanish)
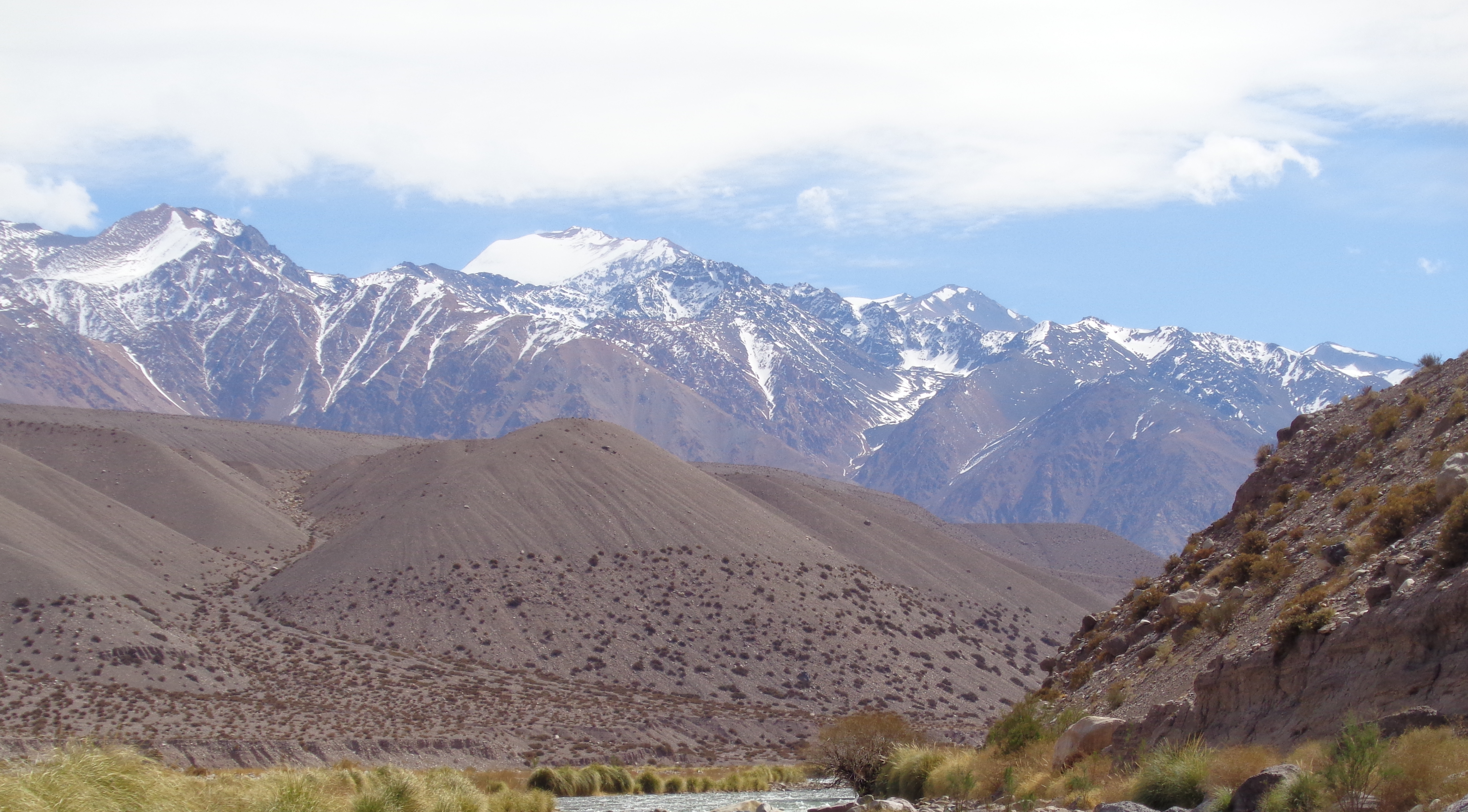
- View of the Río Blanco in Calingasta

- Flag Coat of arms

- Location of San Juan within Argentina
- Coordinates: 30.87°S 68.98°W
- Country: Argentina
- Capital: San Juan
- Departments: 19
- Districts: 100

Government
  - Governor: Marcelo Orrego (JxC)
  - Vice Governor: Fabian Martin
  - National Deputies: 6
  - National Senators: 3

Area Ranked 15th
  - Total: 89,651 km^{2} (34,614 sq mi)

Population (2022 census)
  - Total: 818,234
  - Rank: 13th
  - Density: 9.1269/km^{2} (23.639/sq mi)
- Demonym: sanjuanino

GDP
  - Total: peso 175 billion (US$6.7 billion) (2018)
- Time zone: UTC−3 (ART)
- ISO 3166 code: AR-J
- HDI (2021): 0.838 very high (19th)
- Website: sanjuan.cfired.org.ar

San Juan Province (Spanish pronunciation: [saŋ ˈxwan]) is a province of Argentina, located in the western part of the country. Neighbouring provinces are, moving clockwise from the north, La Rioja, San Luis and Mendoza. It borders Chile to the west.

The province has an area of 89,651 km^{2}, covering a mountainous region with scarce vegetation, fertile oases and turbulent rivers. Throughout the province there are a number of paleontological sites.

Similar to other regions in Argentina, agriculture is one of the most important economic activities, highlighting wine production and olive oil. Additionally, a variety of fruits and vegetables are produced in the fertile valleys irrigated by artificial channels in the western part, close to the Andes mountain range. San Juan Province ranks second in terms of wine production by volume both at the national level and in South America as a whole. It is also an important center of mining and oil production.

== History ==
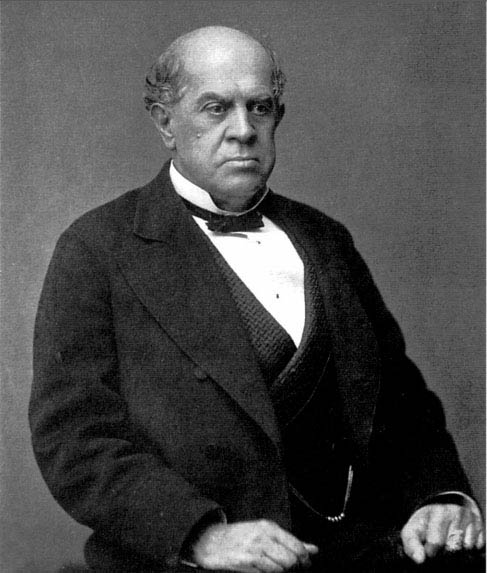
Domingo Faustino Sarmiento, Governor of San Juan in 1862–64, he enacted the nation's first compulsory education laws, which became a national policy when he was elected president in 1868.

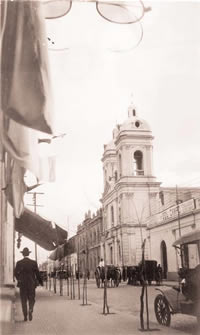
Downtown San Juan, 1910.

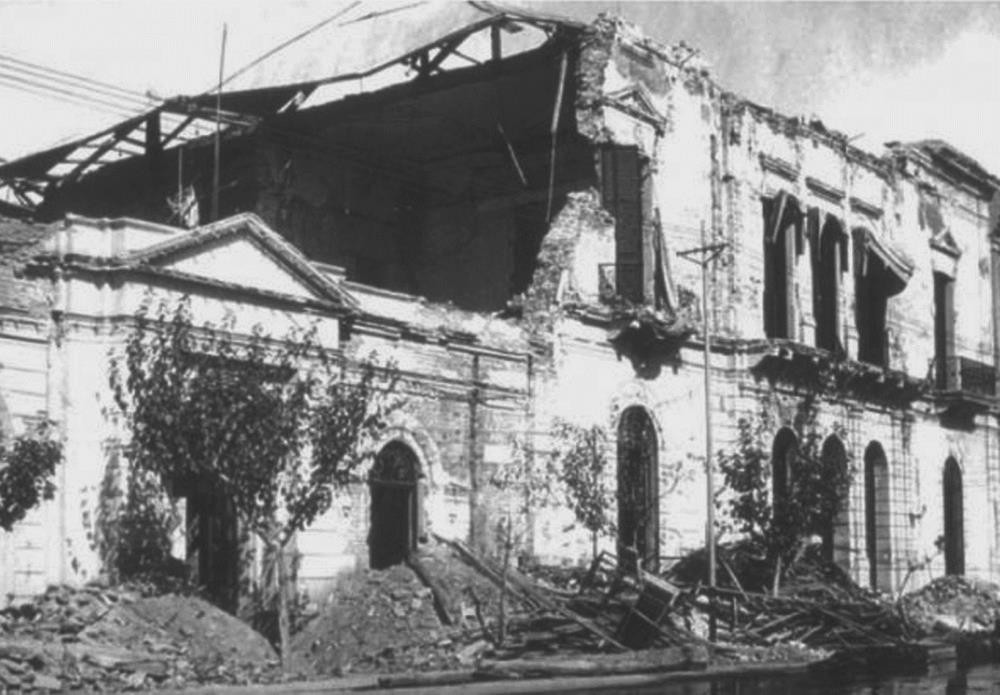
Scene following the 1944 earthquake.

Before the arrival of Spanish conquistadores, different tribes like Huarpes, Diaguitas, Capazanes, Olongastas and Yacampis, highly influenced by the Inca Empire, inhabited the area.

The city of San Juan de la Frontera was founded by Juan Jufré y Montesa in 1562 and relocated 2 kilometres south in 1593 due to the frequent flooding of the San Juan River.

In 1776, San Juan was annexed to the Viceroyalty of the Río de la Plata, becoming one of the cities of the Province of Cuyo. In the same year, the first recorded earthquake caused massive damage to the city.

The father of Argentine independence, Gen. Jose de San Martin, was appointed Governor of the Province of Cuyo in 1814. From there, San Martin began his legendary crossing of the Andes, one of military history's great tactical decisions. San Juan, then a small town, was a great supporter of the expedition supplying gold, men and mules.

In 1820, San Juan was granted autonomy from the Province of Cuyo, thereby becoming an autonomous province. The remainder of Cuyo region became Mendoza Province.

Following an era of international isolation for Argentina, the advent of new, more liberal government in 1853 attracted a number of exiled intellectuals back into San Juan. Among these, was a San Juan military officer and novelist named Domingo Sarmiento. Sarmiento was eventually elected governor in 1862, pursuing sorely needed public investments and enacting Argentina's first law mandating compulsory education (at that time about 80% of the adult population lacked any form of education). Once elected President of Argentina in 1868, those policies became national law.

In 1944 a moderate, yet highly destructive earthquake near the capital destroyed most of the city and killed 10,000 people. A fundraiser was organized to raise money for the victims of the quake where Colonel Juan Perón met his eventual wife and political companion Eva Duarte.

A more powerful earthquake stuck the same city in 1977; however new construction codes put in effect following the 1944 incident kept damage to a relative minimum. The most noteworthy loss following this event was the destruction of the Cathedral of San Juan (image, at top). A new, modernist house of worship was quickly put up in its place and inaugurated in 1979.

Among the most rapidly growing provinces in Argentina after 1945, the national government began the construction of the National University of San Juan, which opened its doors in 1973. Congress further responded to the needs of San Juan's growing agricultural sector by breaking ground in the mid '70s for the largest hydrostructural project in the province up to that point, the Ullum Dam and Reservoir. Inaugurated in 1980, it has contributed to the province's production of irrigated desert crops, like olives, figs and, most importantly, wine grapes.

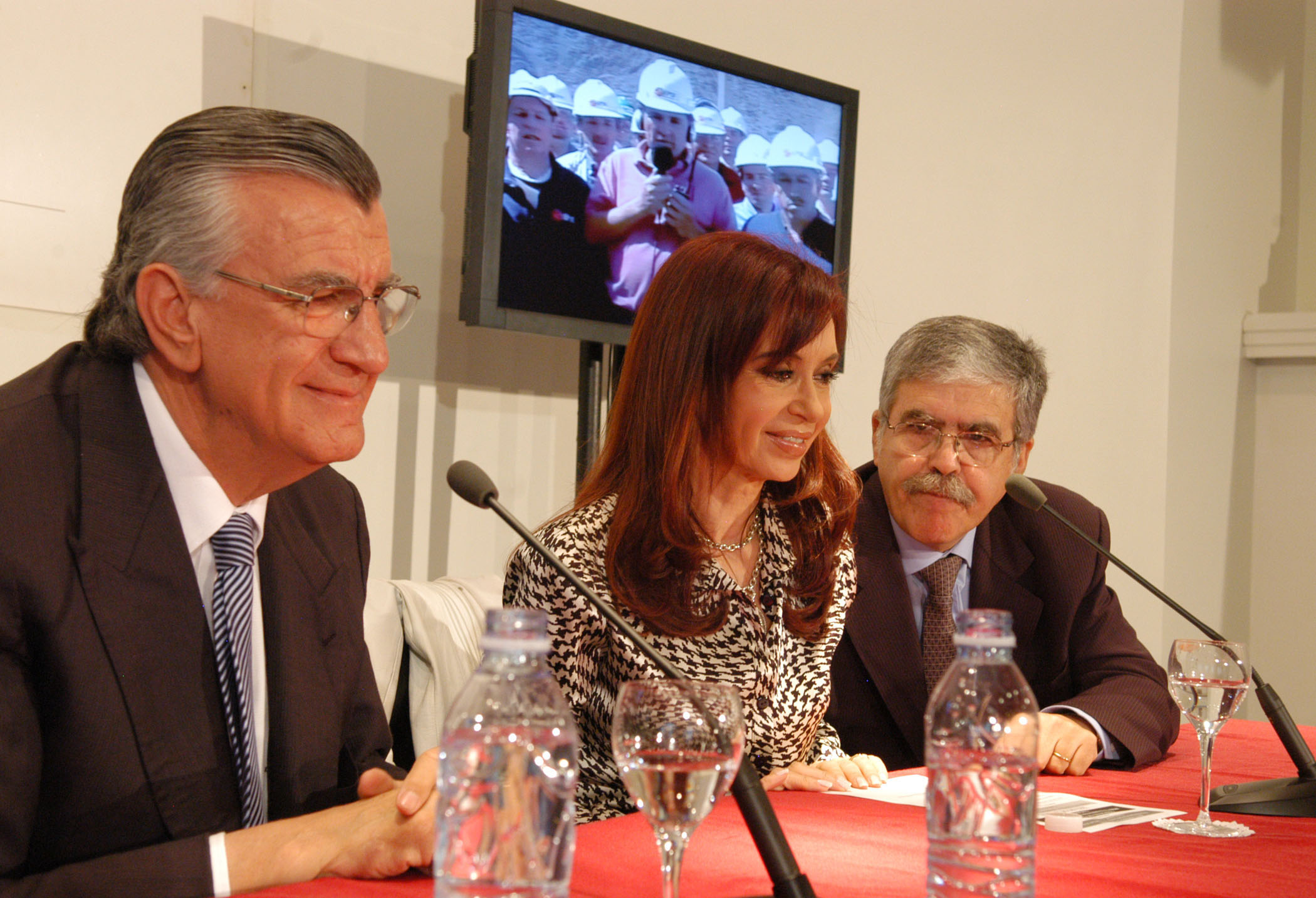
Jose Luis Gioja, alongside Cristina Kirchner at the opening of the Caracoles Dam.

In 2005, Barrick Gold Corporation, one of the world's largest gold-mining conglomerates, announced the purchase of large tracts in the San Juan Andes where a gold mine was started. These have, so far, been yielding over 11,000 ounces of gold yearly, though evidence suggests these activities may be having an adverse impact on San Juan's glaciers.

In 2007, the same company installed the world's highest-situated wind turbine at the Veladero mine in San Juan Province at nearly 4,200m elevation.

== Geography ==
Köppen climate map of San Juan, Argentina

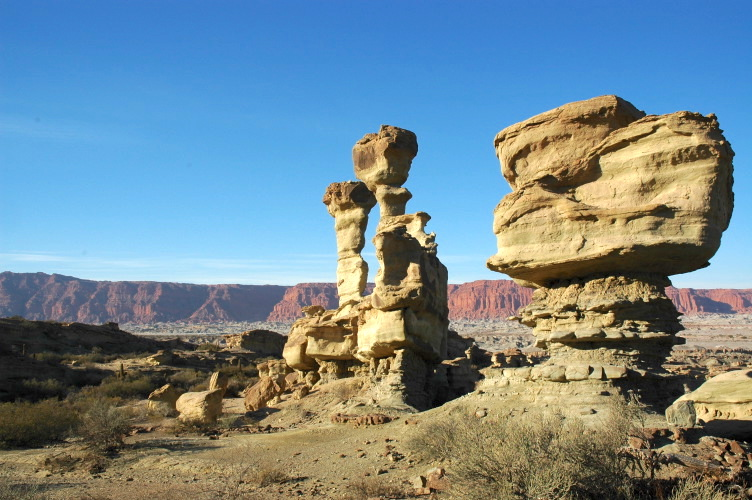
Ischigualasto Provincial Park.

The province is part of the continental semi-desert Cuyo region. The arid plains start on the east, with a few low hills in the middle and swiftly turn into 6,000-meter-high mountain peaks towards the west. Both areas are subject to the dry hot Zonda (a kind of foehn wind). Most of the precipitations take place during the summer, often as electrical storms.

The hot wind has modeled the clay-rich red soil into Pampa del Leoncito (Reserva Natural Estricta El Leoncito) and Valle de la Luna (Parque Provincial Ischigualasto) 200-million-year-old geological formations.

The Jáchal and San Juan rivers, both part of Desaguadero River system, are the source of fertile valleys and centre of the province's economy. The San Juan River finishes in the Huanacache lagoons (sometimes called Guanacache), on the southeast.

The Andes of San Juan Province belong to the Dry Andes climatic province. Permafrost is widespread above 3000 masl in the Andes and rock glaciers are common.

The northern part of the province contain both intrusive rocks of the Colangüil Batholith and a large sedimentary basin known as Iglesia Basin. Within this basin there are hot springs.

== Demographics ==
Ethno-racial groups in San Juan (2022 census)
1. Undeclared (97.9%)
2. Native (1.80%)
3. Black (0.30%)

San Juan concentrates most of its population in the oases or central valleys, Tulum Valley, Zonda, Ullum and Jáchal, containing nearly 80% of this population. The remaining is located in the oasis located at the foot of the Andes in Iglesias and Calingasta. Another population concentration is in Fertile Valley.

== Economy ==
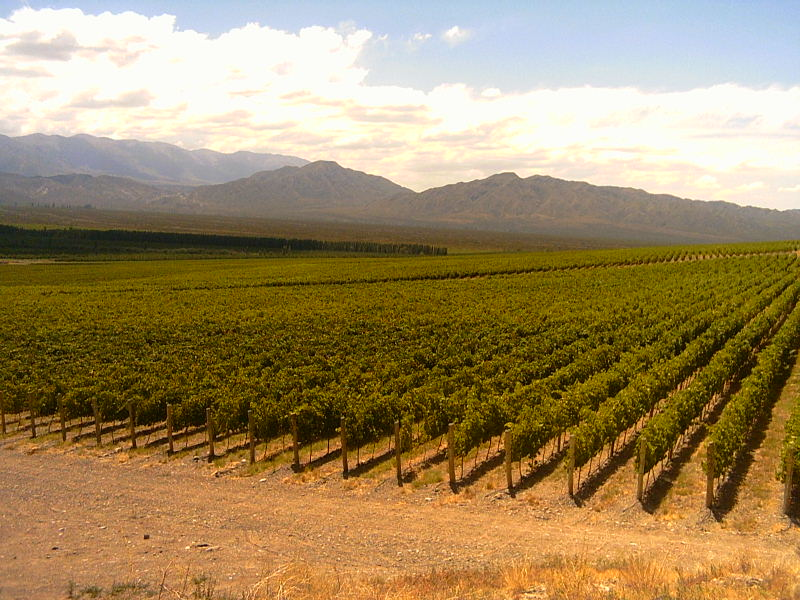
Vineyards on the Andes foothills.

San Juan focuses its economy in agriculture, specially wine production. Additionally, preserved foods production is highly developed. Mining is a growing activity, with the extraction of various minerals financed by multinational companies. Tourism is a relatively new and flourishing activity and it is becoming an important source of revenue for the province.

San Juan's is a somewhat underdeveloped, yet diversified, economy. Its output was estimated in 2006 at US$3.613 billion, or US$5,827 per capita (a third less than the national average).

Agriculture has, traditionally, played a small, though significant role in San Juan's economy. The province produces crops not widely grown in other regions of Argentina. San Juan is the second-largest producer of Argentine Wine, after neighboring Mendoza Province.

The winemaking industry reached San Juan between the years 1569 and 1589 carried by the Spanish conquistadors. Blessed by the optimal weather conditions and soil, the wine-making largely expanded and accelerated development in the province. Since the beginning, the inhabitants of the region understood that the arid climate required an advanced artificial irrigation system with dams and channels.

Viticulture is the main crop of the province's economy, with some 500 km^{2} (56% of the productive area), and the rest is reserved for wine production counting 90% of the crop. Other products include tomato, maize, potato, fig and peach.

Since 1980, San Juan has experienced an industrial expansion that now includes, in addition to the wineries, food processing plants, chemical, plastics, iron, auto parts and textiles factories. Manufacturing now accounts for nearly 20% of San Juan's production output.

In the year 2000, the province came into mineral development with the Veladero Project of Barrick Gold, which, on the first year of mining alone, yielded more than 11,000 ounces of gold. These efforts were intensified with more projects including the Easter Lama, with the particularity that it is shared with neighboring Chile. The more widespread mining products are gold, lead, graphite and clay.

Large-scale efforts began, in 2006, in the search for petroleum in the department of Jáchal.

Energy production is mainly hydroelectric, produced by a few dams such as Quebrada de Ullum, La Roza, San Emiliano and El Pinar Station, which also help to regulate the water level for irrigation of the arid lands. Electricity is also produced, in a lesser proportion, by thermal power stations.

San Juan has recently started to have a flourishing tourism industry. Remarkable places are the city of San Juan, the Ischigualasto Provincial Park, the Ullum Dam, San Guillermo National Park, the Pismanta hot springs, the Mercedario Mount and the pagan Difunta Correa shrine. These sites are specially suitable for ecotourism or adventure tourism. Furthermore, an increase in agrotourism has started recently, particularly, around the wine industry, creating the so-called "Wine Routes."

== Government ==
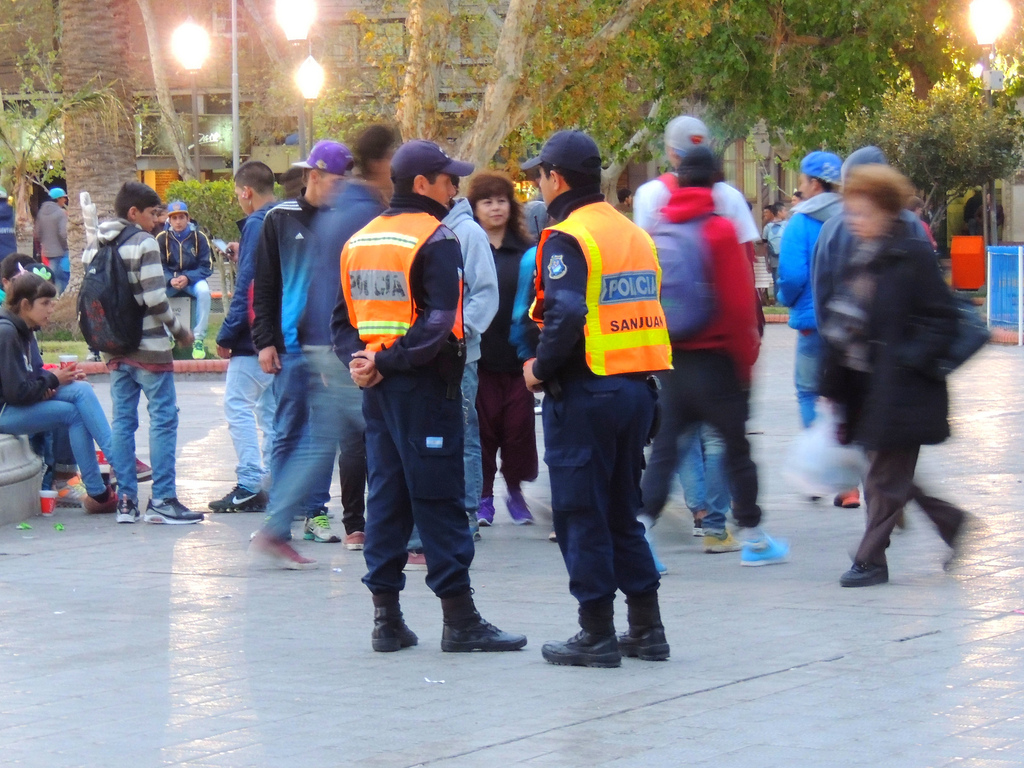
San Juan Provincial Police

The provincial government is divided into three branches: the executive, headed by a popularly elected governor, who appoints the cabinet; the legislative; and the judiciary, headed by the Supreme Court.

The Constitution of San Juan Province, Argentina forms the formal law of the province.

In Argentina, the most important law enforcement organization is the Argentine Federal Police but the additional work is carried out by the San Juan Provincial Police.

== Political division ==
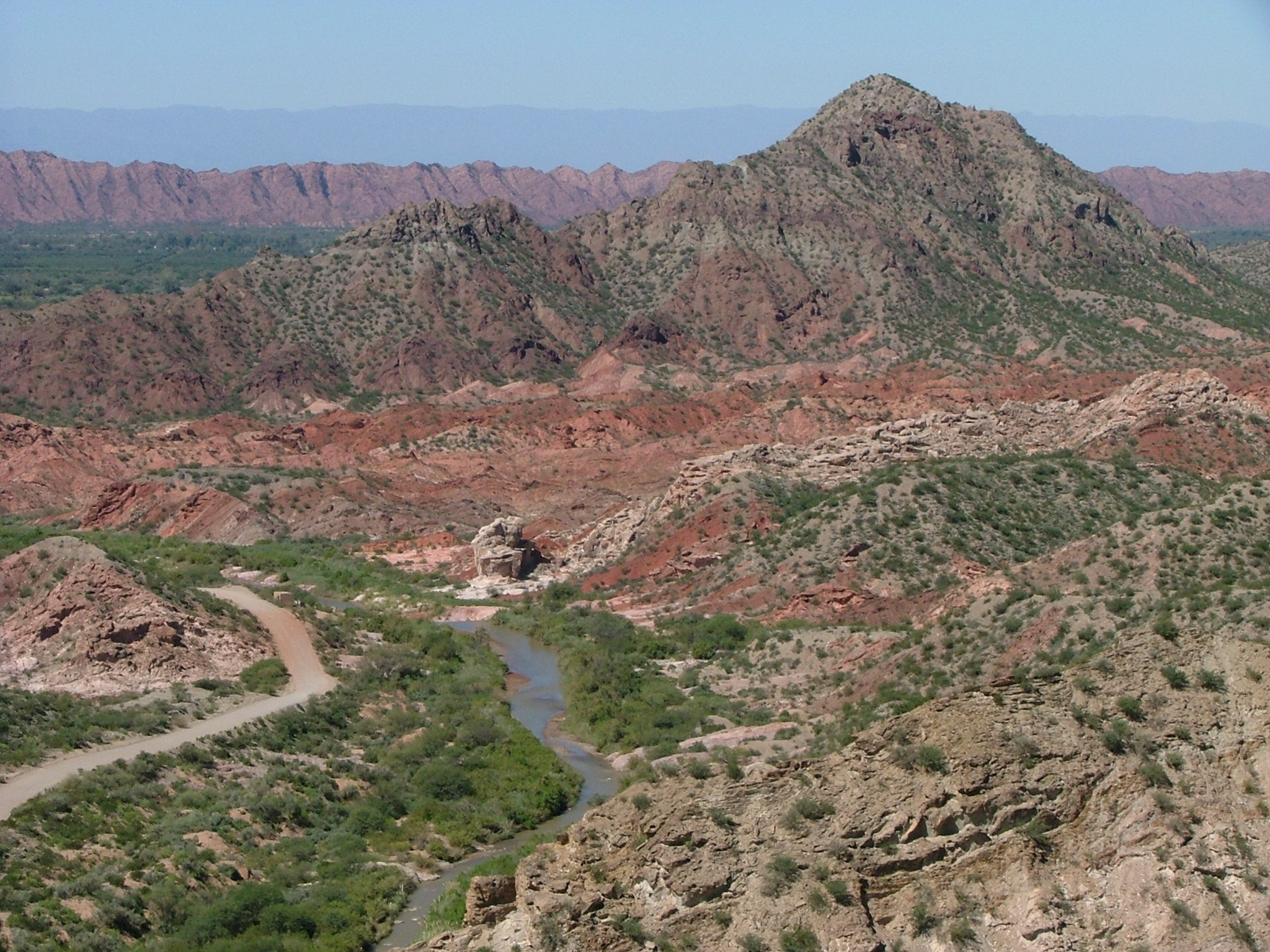
Huaco, Jáchal Department.

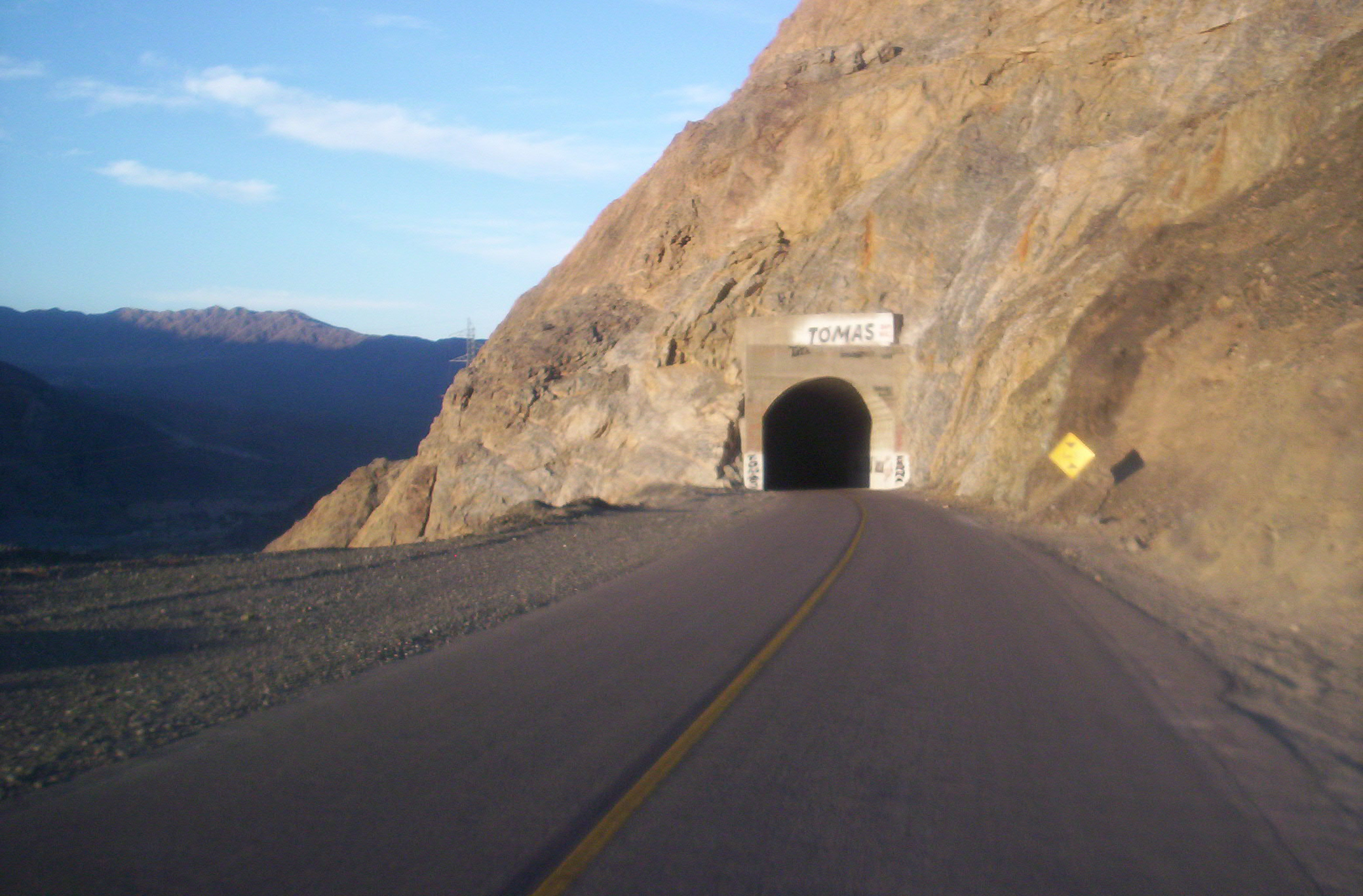
Tunnel on National Route 150, Iglesia Department

The province is divided into 19 departments (Spanish: departamentos). They are formally considered to be a single municipality, and usually contain one or more population centers (i.e. towns and cities).

1. Albardón (General San Martín)
2. Angaco (Villa del Salvador)
3. Calingasta (Tamberías)
4. Capital (San Juan)
5. Caucete (Caucete)
6. Chimbas (Paula Alabarracín de Sarmiento)
7. Iglesia (Rodeo)
8. Jáchal (San José de Jáchal)
9. Nueve de Julio (9 de Julio)
10. Pocito (Villa Aberastain)
11. Rawson (Villa Krause)
12. Rivadavia (Rivadavia)
13. San Martín (San Isidro)
14. Santa Lucía (Santa Lucía)
15. Sarmiento (Media Agua)
16. Ullum (Villa Ibáñez)
17. Valle Fértil (San Agustín)
18. Veinticinco de Mayo (Santa Rosa)
19. Zonda (Basilio Nievas)

== Tourism ==
San Juan, known as The Land of the Sun, offers mountains, valleys and turbulent rivers of melting glacier water from the Andes. This features create a unique landscape that is beginning to be intensively exploited by tourism.

Tourism infrastructure has been also improved recently with the installation of a considerable number of hotels and other accommodation. Heavily developed areas are the northwest, in the town of Rodeo, where posts and countryside hotels have been installed. In the west, the towns of Calingasta Barreal and Tamberías, many projects are being develop to foster adventure tourism by with the practice of climbing the Mount Mercedario, which is one of the highest peaks in America. The northern zone, Jáchal, is known for its cultural tourism related to the gaucho tradition.

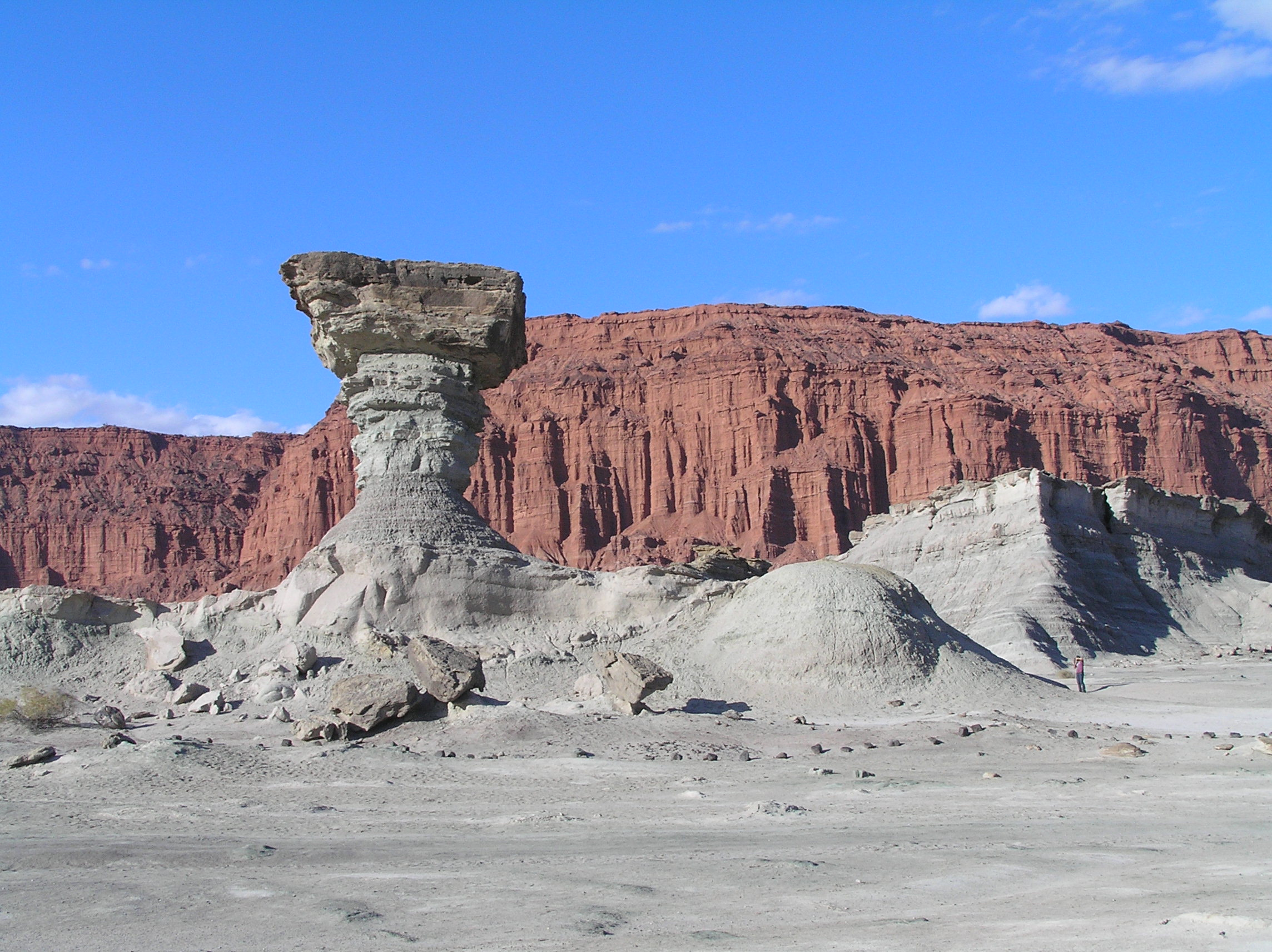
Ischigualasto national park

Nevertheless, San Juan is the economic center of the province and also the most visited place. It is known for its modern architecture that differentiates it from others cities in the rest of the country, with wide tree-lined streets as well as hardwood parks, plazas and walkways, in the middle of the desert of San Juan. This is the cause for which has the nickname of 'city oasis'. The city holds several attractions such as Sarmiento's birthplace and modern Cathedral, among others.

A number of joyful celebrations are held in the province, combining old and new traditions that pay homage to economic activities or natural events like Fiesta Nacional del Sol, which takes the form of annual parades carousel and various artistic performances.

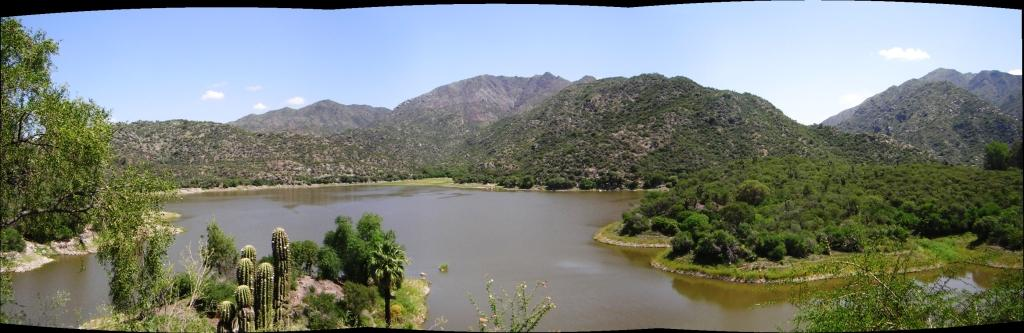
Valle Fértil.

The winter sports industry has a prosper future in the province. A ski resort is under development, located in the mountainous area of Calingasta, western part of the province, where the largest ski tracks in South America are being constructed. This will be the northernmost ski resort in Argentina and will be known as Manantiales'

== Transportation ==
San Juan has a good transportation network, as most of the routes that connect with the rest of the country are in very good maintenance condition. The more important routes are the RN40, which crosses from north to south and joins the provinces of Mendoza and La Rioja, the RN20, which links San Juan with the city of Buenos Aires and Cordoba, the RN150, which allows a connection to the country of Chile. There are important projects under way that will allow a connection with the province of La Rioja, the entire northern Fertile Valley, Jáchal and Church, and with Chile, which will be a vital part of the strategic corridor Pacific-Atlantic .

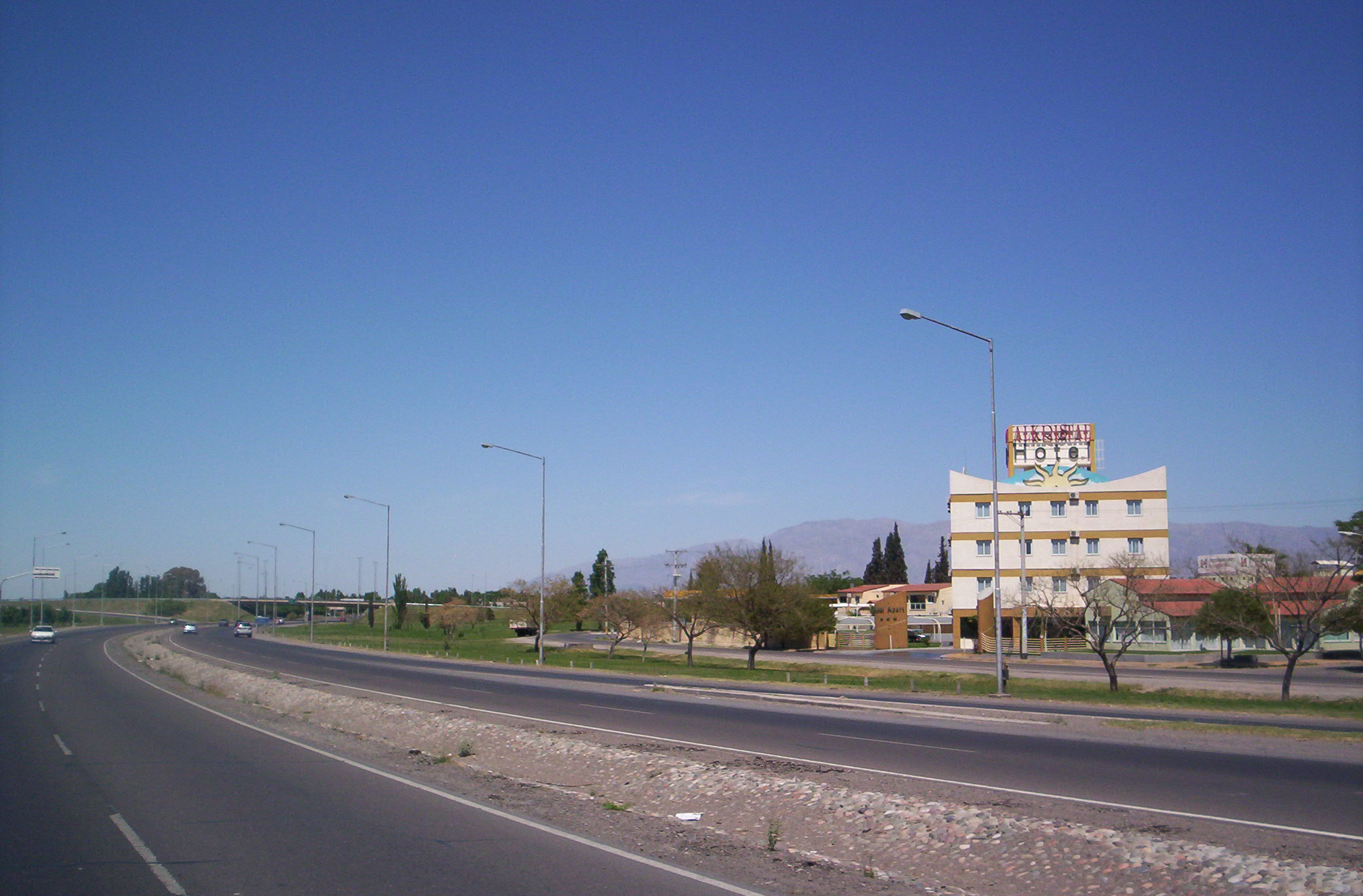
Motorway in Santa Lucia

This project for the construction of a communication path connecting the Pacific ports of (Coquimbo, Chile) and Atlantic (Porto Alegre, Brazil) by Paso de Agua Negra, has been under development for more than a decade. Its importance lies in the necessity of the Southern Cone countries to put their export production into the global market at lower costs.

Long-distance transportation exists and allows weekly trips to almost all the other provinces and cities in the country. The main hub is the modern bus terminal of the city of San Juan. There are another important transportation centers in San José de Jáchal and in the city of Caucete, which is currently under construction. By bus, it takes around 18 hours to get Buenos Aires.

There are daily flight services to Buenos Aires from Domingo Faustino Sarmiento Airport.

The public transportation system in the city of San Juan and surrounding areas includes buses that connect downtown with other cities such as Villa Krause, Rivadavia, Santa Lucia, Villa Paula Sarmiento Albarracín and Aberastain. Private taxis (called Remis) and public taxis also exist. Rapid population growth has led to a number of projects for the construction of mass transit systems.

== See also ==
- 1894 San Juan earthquake
- 1944 San Juan earthquake
- 1952 San Juan earthquake
- 1977 San Juan earthquake
