= 1977 San Juan earthquake =

Earthquake in Argentina

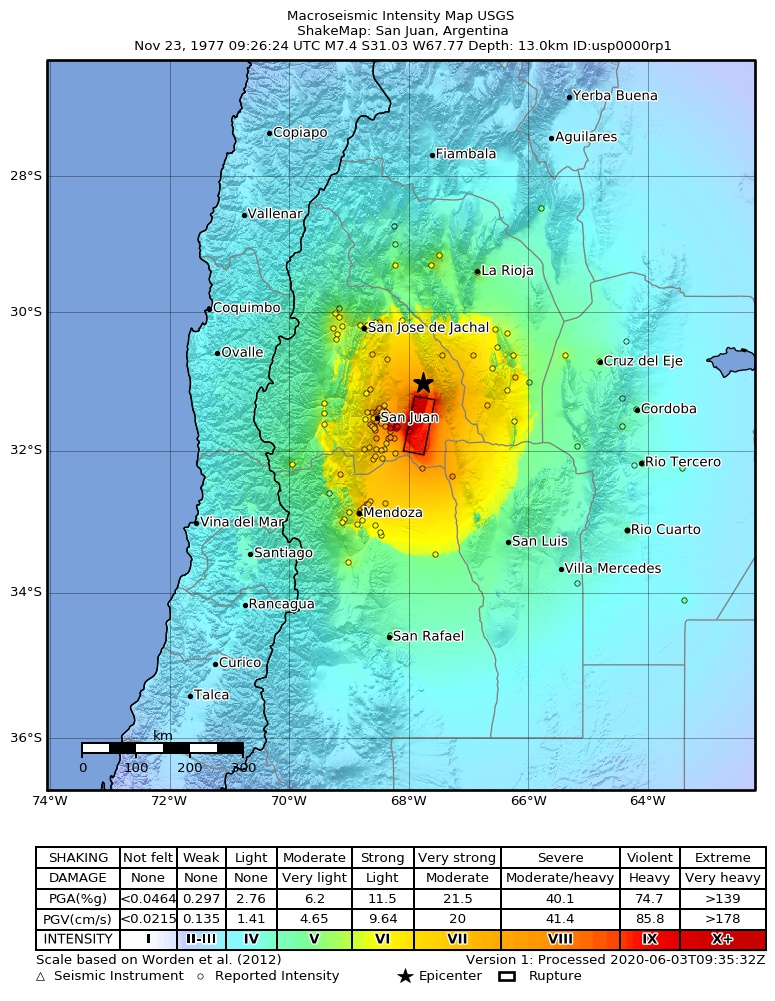

- Location within Argentina
- UTC time: 1977-11-23 09:26:26
- ISC event: 690743
- USGS-ANSS: ComCat
- Local date: 23 November 1977
- Local time: 06:26:26
- Magnitude: 7.5 M_{w}, 7.4 M_{s}
- Depth: 15 km (9.3 mi)
- Epicenter: 31.119°S 67.839°W
- Type: Reverse
- Max. intensity: MMI X (Extreme)
- Casualties: 65 deaths

The 1977 San Juan earthquake, also known as Caucete earthquake, took place in the province of San Juan, Argentina, on 23 November at 06:26:26 AM. It measured 7.5 on the moment magnitude scale, and had a maximum perceived intensity of X (Extreme) on the Mercalli intensity scale.

The earthquake caused fatalities and severe damage to buildings throughout the province, especially in the city of Caucete, where at least 65 people died. It also caused slight damage in the north of the Greater Mendoza metropolitan area. Its were felt as far away as Buenos Aires, where people were awakened that Wednesday by the tremor. People left their houses at dawn in panic at the Argentinian capital, located at 1,000 km (620 mi) to the east southeast.

== Tectonic setting ==
San Juan Province lies in an area where the South American plate is affected by flat-slab subduction of the underlying Nazca plate, the so-called Pampean flat-slab. The very shallow angle leads to a much greater degree of coupling between the subducting and overriding plates. The increased coupling leads to shortening of the crust of the South American plate, causing active thrust tectonics and rapid uplift, forming the Sierras Pampeanas. The Pie de Palo range is one of the active structures, interpreted to be controlled by major thrust faults. The overall structure has been interpreted as both thin-skinned and thick-skinned.

== Earthquake ==
The earthquake consisted of two sub-events, separated by about 20 seconds, treated by some seismologists as foreshock and mainshock. The observed focal mechanism was reverse faulting, on a north–south trending structure. From the mainshock alone, it was not possible to decide whether the fault responsible dipped to the west or east. Analysis of the aftershock sequence suggests that two separate faults moved during the earthquake, the earlier event on a segment to the north and the later one to the south. The fault segments have been interpreted as both alternating west and eastward-dipping faults or as an east-dipping fault in the hanging-wall of a larger west-dipping fault.

There was no surface rupture associated with the earthquake and it is an example of a blind thrust earthquake on thrust faults underlying the Pie de Palo range.

== Damage ==
There was widespread damage in San Juan Province. The towns of Bermejo and Caucete were particularly badly affected. Many houses constructed of adobe or unreinforced masonry were either badly damaged or destroyed and very large areas were affected by liquefaction. More modern structures, built to earthquake resistant designs, in contrast showed little damage. At least 65 people were killed and a further 284 were injured. The extensive damage left many homeless, with estimates in the range 20,000 to 40,000.

The area's wine industry was heavily impacted due to damage to both buildings and particularly wine storage tanks, reducing the wine storage capacity of the affected area by about 10 million litres.

== See also ==
- List of earthquakes in 1977
- List of earthquakes in Argentina
