= Caucete Department =

CAUCETE Departamento Caucete
- Department
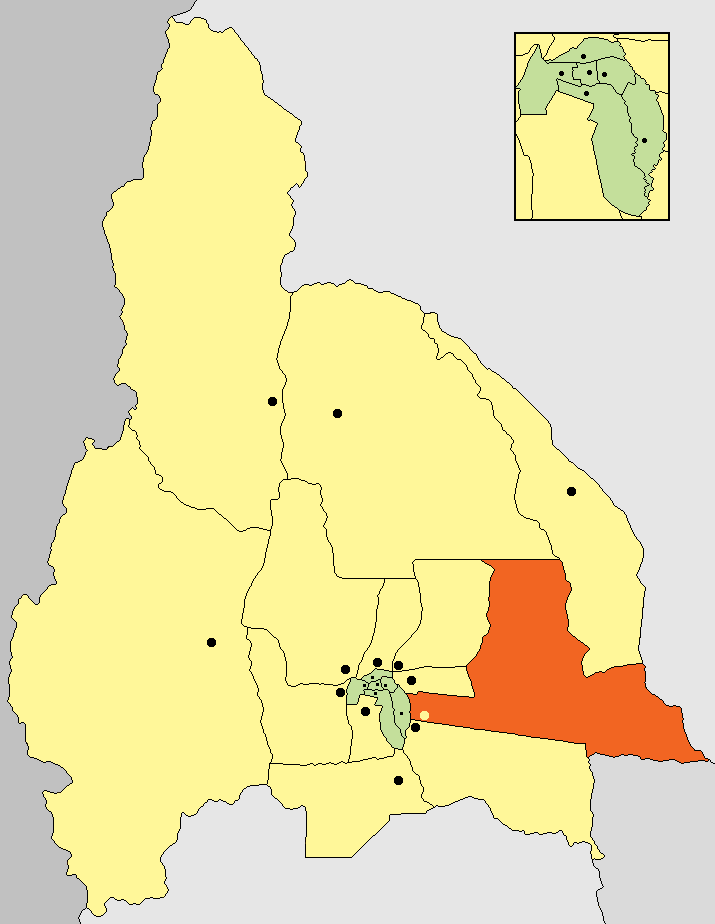
- location of Departamento Caucete in San Juan Province
- Coordinates: 31°40′S 68°08′W
- Country: Argentina
- Established: November 15, 1851
- Seat: San Juan

Government
  - Intendant: Romina Rosas

Area
  - Total: 7.502 km^{2} (2.897 sq mi)

Population (2001 census [INDEC])
  - Total: 33,609
  - Density: 4,480/km^{2} (11,600/sq mi)
- Demonym: caucetero/a
- Postal Code: 5400
- IFAM: SJU004
- Area Code: 0264
- Patron saint: Cristo Rey

Caucete is a department in the eastern part of the San Juan Province of Argentina, which is predominantly a landscape of mountains, and many plantations. It contains the popular Shrine of the Difunta Correa.

== Etymology ==
The name is derived from the Tehuelche word "caucete", meaning "land or land where he dwells".

== History ==
When the Spanish arrived, the area of Caucete, was occupied by the Huarpes, in a settlement in the vicinity of Pie de Palo. Nearly three centuries later (in 1822), to establish a colony with American population, Amman Rawson asked the government for these lands, which were awarded in 1824. Rawson, the father of William Rawson, chaired the Founding Society of Caucete, which divided the land into 25 blocks, each further bifurcated into two parts, through a ditch central allowed to hold irrigation in the plot. The colony began to be populated, but with the people in the area, not American immigration.

Subsequently, Benavides, through the Regulation Irrigation 1851, divided the province into nine sections, one of which was Caucete. Through its Departmental Commission and with the support of the neighborhood, the new section proposed a project for the foundation of a villa. Thus was born Villa Independence, by the decree of November 15, 1851.

== Geography ==
The department Caucete is located in the southeast of the San Juan Province, 28 kilometers east of San Juan. It is 7,502 km ² in area. The village head is Caucete. Its boundaries are:

- To the north, the department Jáchal
- To the south, the 25 de Mayo and San Luis Province
- To the east, the Valle Fértil and La Rioja province
- To the west, the 9 de Julio, San Martin Department, San Juan San Martin and Angaco departments

=== Ecology ===
The department can be divided into four distinct sections: one that corresponds to Valley Tulum, the area of the Depression of the Crossing (Crossing of Ampacama), bed Bermejo River The mountainous area of the structure corresponding to the formation Sierras Pampeanas (Cerro Pie de Palo) and the area of Under Great Eastern. The vegetation is a xerófila and low: retamo, chilca (an endemic tree that is native San Juan, in Skirts Oriental Foot pole, also of La Rioja and San Luis), jarilla, cacti and a large number of carob.

=== Animals ===
The fauna is represented by hares, some foxes, rheas armadillos and guanacos in the high peaks of Pie de Palo. There are also a large number of insects (mosquitoes, flies, beetles, assassin bugs, cicadas, etc.), arachnids (scorpions and different species of spiders) and reptiles (lizards, iguanas and snakes), especially in the area of sand dunes. Daytime temperatures are high and the nights are cooler. In some cases, there is isolated snowfall in the area known as Vallecito, as happened in the winters of 1999 to 2000.
