= Sarmiento Department, San Juan =

Sarmiento Departamento Sarmiento
- Department
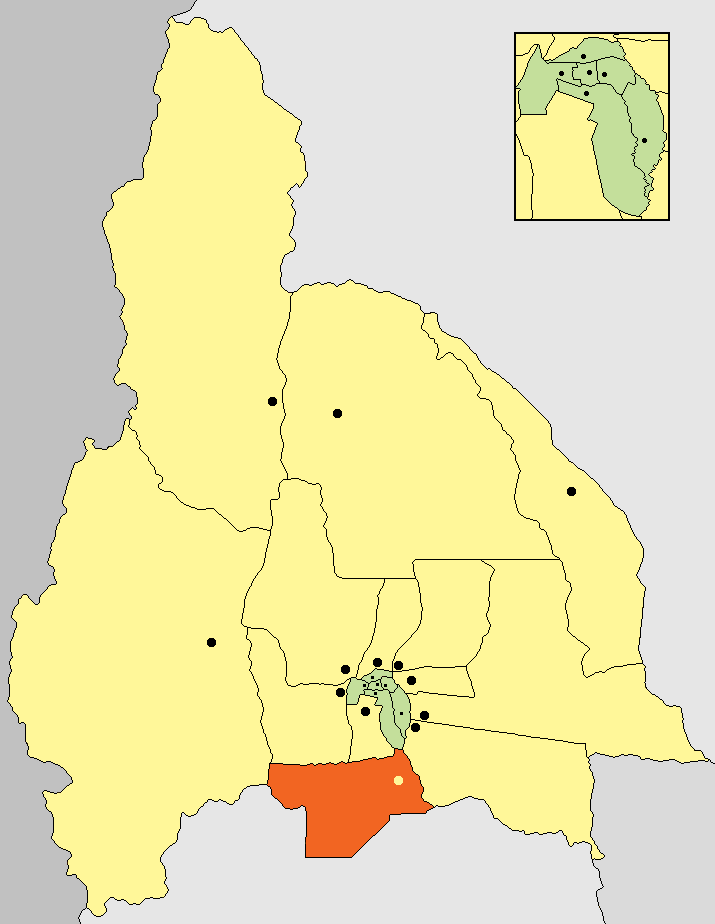
- location of Sarmiento Department in San Juan Province
- Coordinates: 32°00′S 68°31′W
- Country: Argentina
- Established: August 28, 1908
- Founder: ?
- Seat: Media Agua

Government
  - Intendant: Alfredo Mario Castro López

Area
  - Total: 14.955 km^{2} (5.774 sq mi)

Population (2001 census [INDEC])
  - Total: 19,092
  - Density: 1,276.6/km^{2} (3,306.5/sq mi)
- Demonym: lasherino/na
- Postal Code: SJ5400
- IFAM: SJU015
- Area Code: 0264
- Patron saint: San Antonio de Padua ?

Sarmiento is a department located in the south of San Juan Province in Argentina.

The provincial subdivision has a population of about 19,000 inhabitants in an area of 14,955 km^{2} (5,774 sq mi), and its capital city is Media Agua, which is located around 1,195 km (743 mi) from the Capital federal.

== Geography ==
Sarmiento is located in the center south of the San Juan Province, bordering the province of Mendoza, 59 kilometers from the city of San Juan, has an area of 2,782 km ²

Its boundaries are:

- To the north: the departments Zonda, and Rawson Pocito
- To the south: the Province of Mendoza
- To the east: the department May 25
- To the west: with the department Calingasta

Relief

The department Sarmiento has a mountainous relief to the west, which belongs to the formation of the foothills, piedmont, formed by sediment that give rise to the river of the arrow and a plain spill east, at the San Juan River area Valley Tulum. Riegan area of the river water, the dry river, the San Juan River, the stream of marshes and artificially concrete channels

== Economy ==
Sarmiento has an area of 9,192 hectares devoted to agriculture, which highlights, vine crops, olives, vegetables such as garlic, onions and tomatoes, cereals and fodder crops, forest and fruit how melon and watermelon, the latter two are products Recognized throughout the province for its quality and quantity. The department Sarmiento was positively received by the Agricultural Promotion Act passed in the province, thanks to today there are plantations with table grapes, grape fine, raisins, wine, fruit carozo, nuggets of fruit, dried fruit, etc..

From the point of view ore in mining department there, mainly limestone and its derivatives in the industry (Cal). It is the activity that characterizes western Sarmiento, more specifically the town of Los Berros. In the case of industry, dominated by the winemaking industry, with many wineries and as far north as the department locates a factory called "Loads Minerals San Juan, where the raw materials for making paint.
