= Albardón Department =

ALBARDON Departamento Albardón
- Department
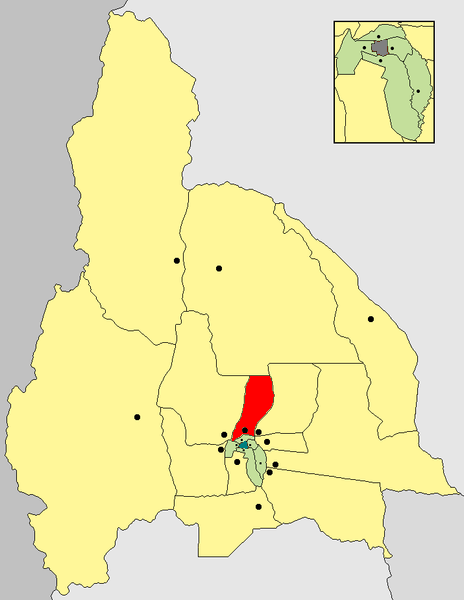
- location of Departamento Caucete in San Juan Province
- Coordinates: 31°25′S 68°30′W
- Country: Argentina
- Established: November 15, 1851
- Seat: Villa General San Martín

Government
  - Intendant: Juan Carlos Abarca

Area
  - Total: 945 km^{2} (365 sq mi)

Population (2001 census [INDEC])
  - Total: 20,413
  - Density: 21.6/km^{2} (55.9/sq mi)
- Demonym: albardonero/a
- Postal Code: 5400
- IFAM: SJU001
- Area Code: 0264

Albardón (Spanish pronunciation: [alˈβoɾðon]) is a department of the San Juan Province (Argentina). It is located in the center south of the same, which emphasizes a desert landscape with mountains and numerous plantations, highlighting the presence of prestigious wineries known nationally.

== Toponymy ==
The word Albardón, in Spanish, represents a kind of "Earth cord" (en español cordón de tierra) or hill that comes up on a piece of land. According to the tradition, this is what the Spanish saw on the north side of the San Juan River, and according to this feature defined the zone name.
