= Rawson Department, San Juan =

Rawson Departamento Rawson
- Department
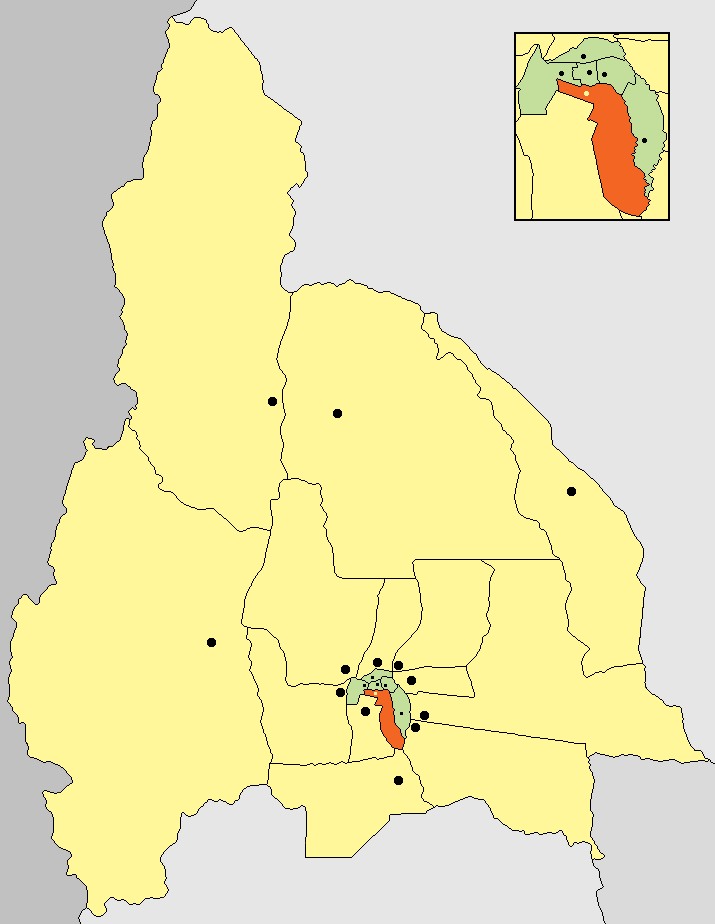
- location of Departamento Rawson in San Juan Province
- Coordinates: 31°34′S 68°31′W
- Country: Argentina
- Established: September 4, 1942
- Founder: ?
- Seat: Villa Krause

Government
  - Intendant: Carlos Munisaga

Area
  - Total: 300 km^{2} (120 sq mi)

Population (2001 census [INDEC])
  - Total: 107,000
  - Density: 360/km^{2} (920/sq mi)
- Demonym: rawsino/a
- Postal Code: 5400
- IFAM: SJU010
- Area Code: 0264
- Patron saint: Virgen de Adacollo
- Website: www.municipioderawson.gov.ar

Rawson is a department of San Juan Province in Argentina.

The provincial subdivision has a population of about 107,000 inhabitants in an area of 164 km^{2} (63 sq mi), and its capital city is Villa Krause, which is located around 1,190 km (740 mi) from Capital Federal.

== Geography ==
Rawson is located in south central province of San Juan, at 6 km (3.7 mi) to the south of the City of San Juan and has an area of 300 km^{2} (120 sq mi). Its boundaries are:

- To the north with the departments of Santa Lucía, and Capital Rivadavia
- To the south with: Pocito and Sarmiento
- To the east of the Pocito
- In west July 9 and May 25

It has an area of 300 km^{2} (120 sq mi), of which 35% is for the urban area, whose header was Villa Krause and the rest to rural and semi-rural area, which covers the southeast and southwest fringe of the Department

Presents a relief little bumpy, almost flat with a slight decline eastwards. The climate is mild with average temperatures of 28 °C (82 °F) in summer and 10 °C (50 °F) in the winter, albeit with broad thermal daily. Few with an average annual rainfall of 97 mm (3.8 in).

The suitability of its soil has enabled the development of high-productivity agriculture, the main economic activity, which is facilitated by a network of irrigation canals by driving water from the San Juan River. Irrigation is supplemented by groundwater, which are extracted by wells electrified. In rural areas are also used wells springs.

== Economy ==
In the department Rawson dominated the business, one of lasmás intense in the province after intense department Capital.

It also highlights an intensive farming mainly in the district of Médano Gold, which highlights planting asparagus, onions, potatoes, apricot, plum and in the western department of numerous plantations vine. Also several hectares has been earmarked for the production horticulture and forestry.

The Department has a Market Hub Fruits and vegetables (rather than marketing of fruit and vegetables), which is the largest in the province, the market has refrigerators and a cooperative packages and garlic exports, which makes a heavy trade in local production and National.

With regard to industry is also intense and there are a large number of factories among the most prominent is "Fruits of Cuyo" where are manufactured preserved fruits and vegetables and also highlights several of the access route south
