= Santa Lucía Department =

Santa Lucía Departamento Santa Lucía
- Department
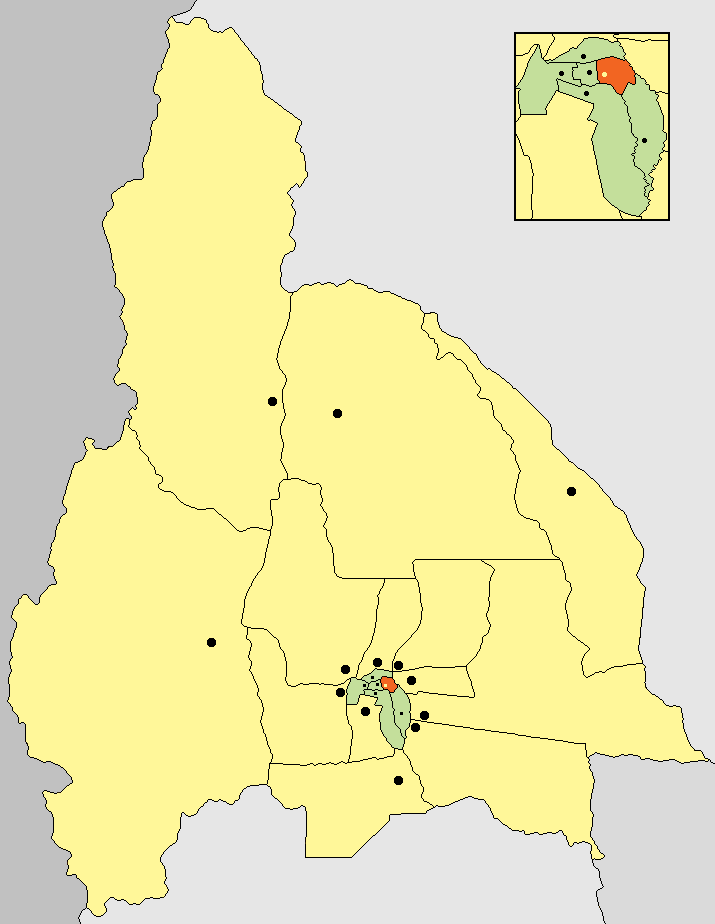
- location of Departamento Santa Lucía in San Juan Province
- Coordinates: 31°32′S 68°28′W
- Country: Argentina
- Established: December 4, 1942
- Founder: ?
- Seat: Santa Lucía

Government
  - Intendant: Juan José Orrego

Area
  - Total: 45 km^{2} (17 sq mi)

Population (2001 census [INDEC])
  - Total: 43,565
  - Density: 970/km^{2} (2,500/sq mi)
- Demonym: lucianesco/a
- Postal Code: 5400
- IFAM: SJU014
- Area Code: 0264
- Patron saint: Santa Lucía

Santa Lucía is a central department of San Juan Province in Argentina.

The provincial subdivision has a population of about 43.565 inhabitants in an area of 45 km^{2} (17 sq mi), and its capital city is Santa Lucía, which is located around 1,150 km (710 mi) from Capital Federal.
