= List of earthquakes in Mendoza Province =

This is a list of earthquakes in Mendoza Province, Argentina.

	Date	Time	Magnitude	Intensity	Epicenter	Depth
1782 Mendoza earthquake	1782-05-22	4:00:00 p.m.	7.0	VIII	33°0′0″S 69°12′0″W	30 km
1861 Mendoza earthquake	1861-03-20	11:00:00 p.m.	7.0	IX	32°53′59″S 68°54′0″W	30 km
1903 Mendoza earthquake	1903-08-12	11:00:00 p.m.	6.0	VII	32°6′0″S 69°5′59″W	70 km
1917 Mendoza earthquake	1917-07-27	2:51:40 a.m.	6.5	VII	32°17′59″S 68°54′0″W	50 km
1920 Mendoza earthquake	1920-12-17	6:59:49 p.m.	6.0	VIII	32°42′0″S 68°24′0″W	40 km
1927 Mendoza earthquake	1927-04-14	6:23:28 a.m.	7.1	VIII	32°0′0″S 69°30′0″W	110 km
1929 Mendoza earthquake	1929-05-23	5:04:00 a.m.	5.7	VI	32°53′59″S 68°54′0″W	30 km
1929 Southern Mendoza earthquake	1929-05-30	9:43:24 a.m.	6.8	VIII	35°0′0″S 68°0′0″W	40 km
1967 Mendoza earthquake	1967-04-25	10:36:15 a.m.	5.4	VI	32°43′11″S 69°10′12″W	45 km
1985 Mendoza earthquake	1985-01-26	3:07:00 a.m.	5.9	VIII	33°7′11″S 68°49′11″W	12 km
2006 Mendoza earthquake	2006-08-05	11:03 a.m	5.7	V-VI	32°13′S 68°57′W	33 km
