= San Juan earthquake =

San Juan earthquake may refer to different earthquakes to affect San Juan, Argentina or the San Juan Province, Argentina:

- 1894 San Juan earthquake, a M_{s} 7.5 magnitude earthquake affecting La Rioja and San Juan
- 1944 San Juan earthquake, a M_{w} 7.0 magnitude earthquake, which led to 10,000 deaths
- 1952 San Juan earthquake, a M_{w} 6.8 magnitude earthquake
- 1977 San Juan earthquake, a M_{s} 7.4 magnitude earthquake affecting the city of Caucete
