= 1844 =

1844 in various calendars
- Gregorian calendar: 1844; MDCCCXLIV
- Ab urbe condita: 2597
- Armenian calendar: 1293; ԹՎ ՌՄՂԳ
- Assyrian calendar: 6594
- Baháʼí calendar: 0–1
- Balinese saka calendar: 1765–1766
- Bengali calendar: 1250–1251
- Berber calendar: 2794
- British Regnal year: 7 Vict. 1 – 8 Vict. 1
- Buddhist calendar: 2388
- Burmese calendar: 1206
- Byzantine calendar: 7352–7353
- Chinese calendar: 癸卯年 (Water Rabbit); 4541 or 4334 — to — 甲辰年 (Wood Dragon); 4542 or 4335
- Coptic calendar: 1560–1561
- Discordian calendar: 3010
- Ethiopian calendar: 1836–1837
- Hebrew calendar: 5604–5605
- Hindu calendars
- Vikram Samvat: 1900–1901
- Shaka Samvat: 1765–1766
- Kali Yuga: 4944–4945
- Holocene calendar: 11844
- Igbo calendar: 844–845
- Iranian calendar: 1222–1223
- Islamic calendar: 1259–1260
- Japanese calendar: Tenpō 15 / Kōka 1 (弘化元年)
- Javanese calendar: 1771–1772
- Julian calendar: Gregorian minus 12 days
- Korean calendar: 4177
- Minguo calendar: 68 before ROC 民前68年
- Nanakshahi calendar: 376
- Thai solar calendar: 2386–2387
- Tibetan calendar: ཆུ་མོ་ཡོས་ལོ་ (female Water-Hare); 1970 or 1589 or 817 — to — ཤིང་ཕོ་འབྲུག་ལོ་ (male Wood-Dragon); 1971 or 1590 or 818

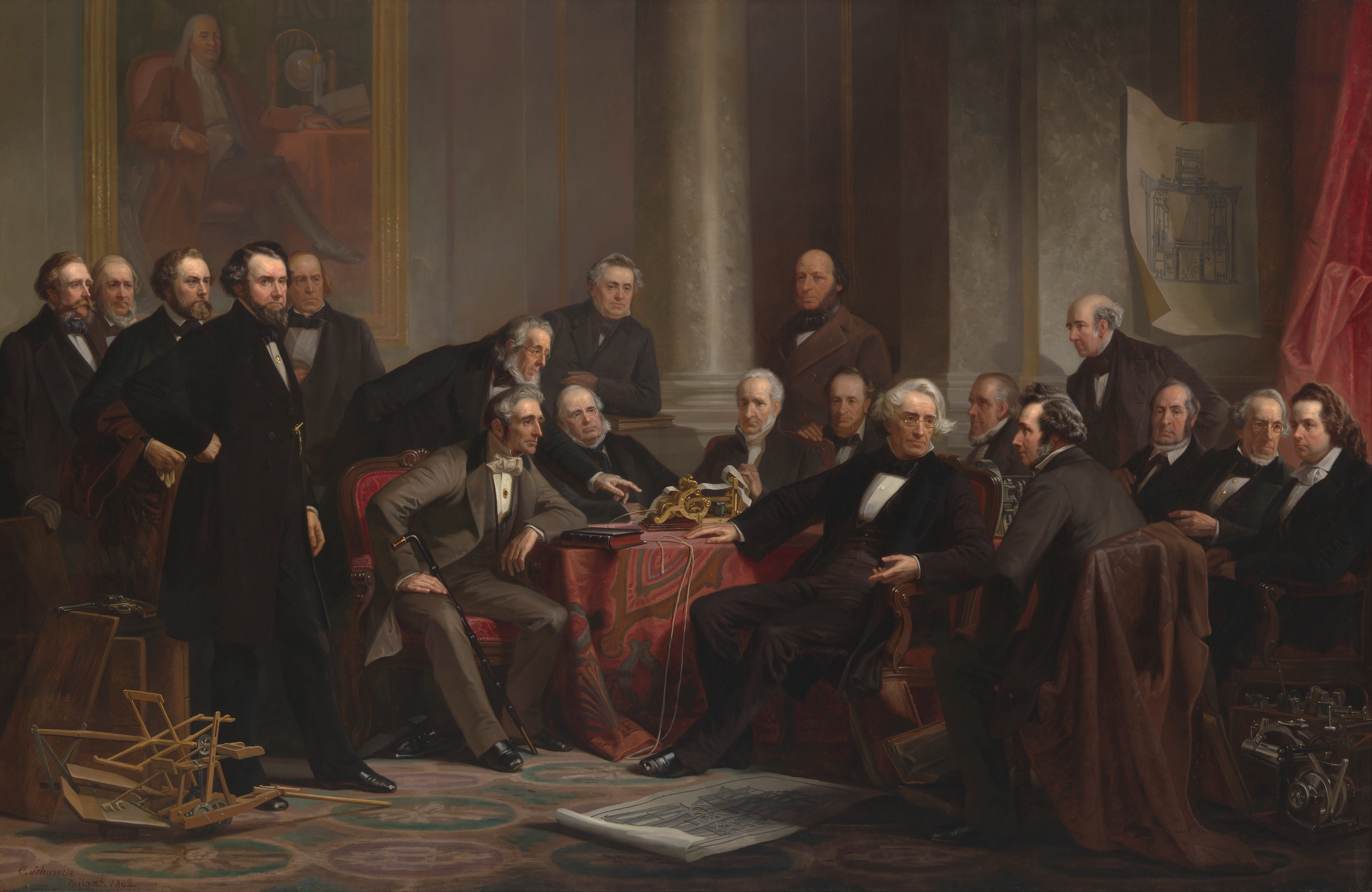
May 24: A new era in telecommunications begins as the first telegraph message is sent.

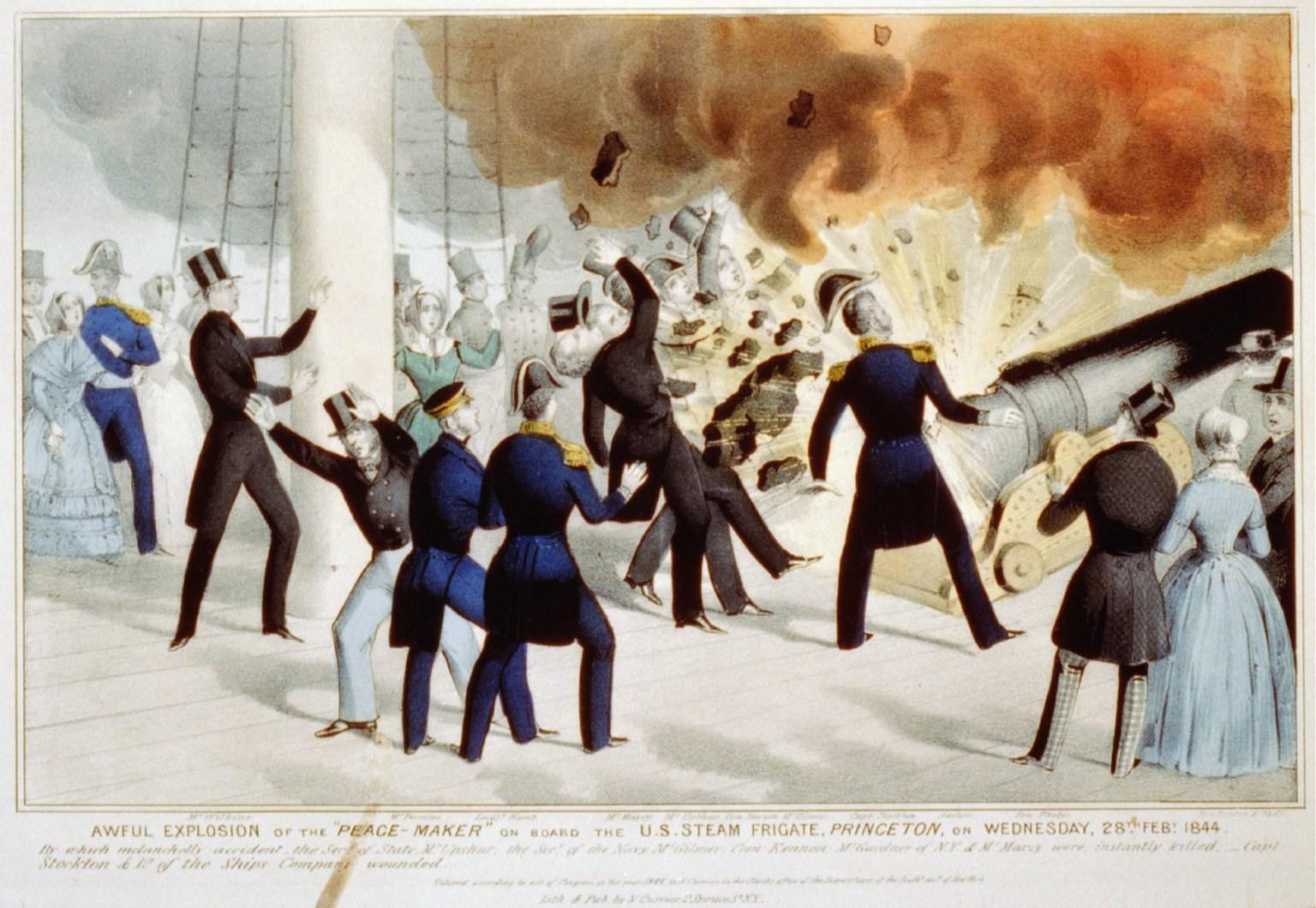
February 28: An explosion on the USS Princeton kills the U.S. Secretary of State and the U.S. Secretary of War.

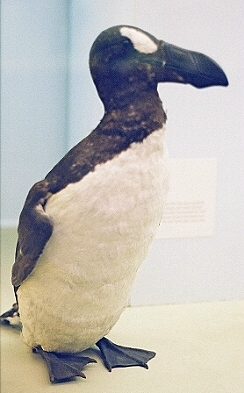
June 3: The great auk becomes extinct as the last pair of auks is killed on an island of Iceland.

1844 (MDCCCXLIV) was a leap year starting on Monday of the Gregorian calendar and a leap year starting on Saturday of the Julian calendar, the 1844th year of the Common Era (CE) and Anno Domini (AD) designations, the 844th year of the 2nd millennium, the 44th year of the 19th century, and the 5th year of the 1840s decade. As of the start of 1844, the Gregorian calendar was 12 days ahead of the Julian calendar, which remained in localized use until 1923.

In the Philippines, 1844 had only 365 days instead of 366, when Tuesday, December 31 was skipped as Monday, December 30 was immediately followed by Wednesday, January 1, 1845, the next day after. The change also applied to Caroline Islands, Guam, Marianas Islands, Marshall Islands and Palau as part of the Captaincy General of the Philippines; these became the first places on Earth to redraw the International Date Line.

== Events ==
=== January–March ===
- January 4 – The first issue of the Swedish-languaged Saima newspaper founded by J. V. Snellman is published in Kuopio, Finland.
- January 15 – The University of Notre Dame, based in the city of the same name, receives its charter from Indiana.
- February 27 – The Dominican Republic gains independence from Haiti.
- February 28 – A gun on the USS Princeton explodes while the boat is on a Potomac River cruise, killing U.S. Secretary of State Abel Upshur, U.S. Secretary of the Navy Thomas Walker Gilmer and four other people. President John Tyler is below decks and is uninjured.
- March 8
  - King Oscar I ascends to the throne of Sweden–Norway upon the death of his father, Charles XIV/III John.
  - The Althing, the parliament of Iceland, is reopened after 45 years of closure.
- March 9 – Giuseppe Verdi's opera Ernani debuts at Teatro La Fenice, Venice.
- March 12 – The Columbus and Xenia Railroad, the first railroad planned to be built in Ohio, is chartered.
- March 13 – The dictator Carlos Antonio López becomes first President of Paraguay.
- March 21 – The Baháʼí calendar begins.
- March 23 – The Edict of Toleration is passed in the Ottoman Empire.

=== April–June ===
- May 1 – The Hong Kong Police Force, the world's second and Asia's first modern, police force is established.
- May 23 – Persian prophet The Báb privately announces his revelation to Mullá Husayn, just after sunset, founding the Bábí faith (later evolving into the Baháʼí Faith as the Báb intended) in Shiraz, Persia (modern-day Iran). Contemporaneously, on this day in nearby Tehran, is the birth of `Abdu'l-Bahá; the eldest Son of Bahá'u'lláh, Prophet-Founder of the Baháʼí Faith. The Báb's mission is to proclaim He whom God shall make manifest. `Abdu'l-Bahá Himself is later proclaimed by Bahá'u'lláh to be His own successor, thus being the third "central figure" of the Baháʼí Faith.
- May 24 – The first electrical telegram is sent by Samuel Morse from the U.S. Capitol in Washington, D.C. to the B&O Railroad "outer depot" in Baltimore, saying "What hath God wrought".
- June 3 – The last definitely recorded pair of great auks are killed on the Icelandic island of Eldey.
- June 4 – Start of the Silesian weavers' uprising. It is crushed by Prussian military on June 6, with 11 weavers killed and numerous arrested.
- June 6 – George Williams sets up (in London) what is often cited as the first youth organisation in the world – "The Young Men's Christian Association", commonly known as YMCA. It will grow to a worldwide organisation based in Geneva, Switzerland, with more than 57 million beneficiaries from 125 national associations. George Williams aims to put Christian principles into practice by developing a healthy "body, mind, and spirit." These three angles are reflected by the different sides of the (red) triangle – part of all YMCA logos.
- June 12 –In the United States, after nine days of heavy rains, the Missouri River and the Mississippi River overflow their banks as the Great Flood of 1844 begins. The water begins to recede by June 28 and the rivers return to their normal level by mid-July.
- June 15 – Charles Goodyear receives a United States patent for vulcanization, a process to strengthen rubber.
- June 17 – Søren Kierkegaard's The Concept of Anxiety is published in Denmark (as Begrebet Angest by 'Vigilius Haufniensis').
- June 22 – The Delta Kappa Epsilon student fraternity is founded at Yale College in the United States. ΔΚΕ will be home to many well known figures, such as U.S. Presidents George W. Bush, George H. W. Bush, Gerald Ford and Theodore Roosevelt.
- June 27 – Killing of Joseph Smith: Joseph Smith, founder of the Latter Day Saint movement, and his brother Hyrum, are murdered in Carthage Jail, Carthage, Illinois by an armed mob, leading to a succession crisis in the movement. John Taylor, future president of the Church of Jesus Christ of Latter-day Saints, is severely injured but survives, while the fourth man inside the upper room, then-apostle Willard Richards, escapes with only a graze to his upper ear.

=== July–September ===
- July 3 – The United States signs the Treaty of Wanghia with the Qing Empire. The treaty establishes five U.S. treaty ports in China with extraterritoriality and is the first unequal treaty that the United States imposes on the dynasty.
- July 19 – The Bank Charter Act 1844 is approved, which restricts the powers of British banks, limiting note-issuing powers outside the central Bank of England.
- August 8 – During a meeting held in Nauvoo, Illinois, the Quorum of the Twelve, headed by Brigham Young, is chosen as the leading body of the Church of Jesus Christ of Latter-day Saints.
- August 10 – German astronomer Friedrich Bessel deduces from the motion of the bright stars Sirius and Procyon that they have dark companions.
- August 14 – Abdelkader El Djezairi is defeated at the Battle of Isly in Morocco; sultan Abd al-Rahman of Morocco soon repudiates his ally.
- August 16 – Narciso Claveria, Governor-General of the Philippines, makes a decree announcing that Monday, December 30, 1844, will be immediately followed by Wednesday, January 1, 1845. (Tuesday, December 31, 1844, is removed from the Philippine calendar because since 1521 the country has been one day behind its Asian neighbors.)
- August 28 – Friedrich Engels and Karl Marx meet in Paris, France.
- September 25–27 – The first ever international cricket match is played in New York City, United States v Canadian Provinces.

=== October–December ===
- October 18 – 1844 Salta earthquake. A magnitude 6.5 earthquake hits Argentina's Salta Province.
- October 22 – This second date predicted by the Millerites for the Second Coming of Jesus (and said to be 6,000 years from creation, relating them to the 6 days of creation, using a day-for-a-year bible principle, with which they proved that the 1,000 years of rest in heaven with God would total to 7,000 years, indicating the completion of creation in the beginning, which make 7 days, but the 7th day is for rest, same as the 7,000th year is for rest in heaven), leads to the Great Disappointment. The Seventh-day Adventist Church believes this date to be the starting point of the Investigative judgment, just prior to the Second Coming of Jesus, as declared in the 26th of 28 fundamental doctrines of Seventh-day Adventists.
- October 23 – The Báb is publicly proclaimed to be the promised one of Islam (the Qá'im, or Mahdi). He is also considered to be simultaneously the return of Elijah, John the Baptist and the "Ushídar-Máh" referred to in the Zoroastrian scriptures. He announces to the world the coming of "He whom God shall make manifest". He is considered the forerunner of Bahá'u'lláh – the founder of the Baháʼí Faith – whose claims include being the return of Jesus.
- November 3 – Giuseppe Verdi's opera I due Foscari debuts at Teatro Argentina, Rome.
- November 6 – The Dominican Republic drafts its first Constitution.
- December 4 – 1844 United States presidential election: James K. Polk defeats Henry Clay.
- December 13 – Hungarian becomes the official language of Hungary.
- December 21 – The Rochdale Pioneers commence business at their cooperative in Rochdale, England.
- December 31 – This date is omitted from the calendar in the Philippines in order to align it with the calendar elsewhere in East Asia, essentially moving the International Date Line to the east of the archipelago.

=== Date unknown ===
- Swedish chemistry professor Gustaf Erik Pasch is granted a privilege for his invention of a safety match.
- Robert Chambers' anonymous Vestiges of the Natural History of Creation, which paves the way for acceptance of Charles Darwin's The Origin of Species, is published in Britain.
- The Free Church Institution is established by Reverend Alexander Duff in Calcutta, India. This is later merged with the General Assembly's Institution to form the Scottish Church College, one of the pioneering institutions that ushers in the Bengali Renaissance.
- In Munich, the Feldherrnhalle is completed.
- In Tibet, the Temple of Guardians burns down.
- Flags of the Ottoman Empire: a national flag is adopted for the Empire.

== Births ==
=== January–March ===
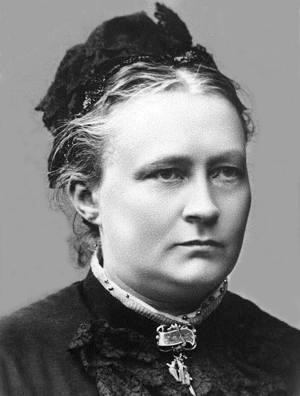
Minna Canth

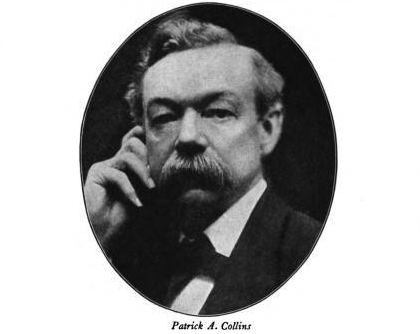
Patrick Collins

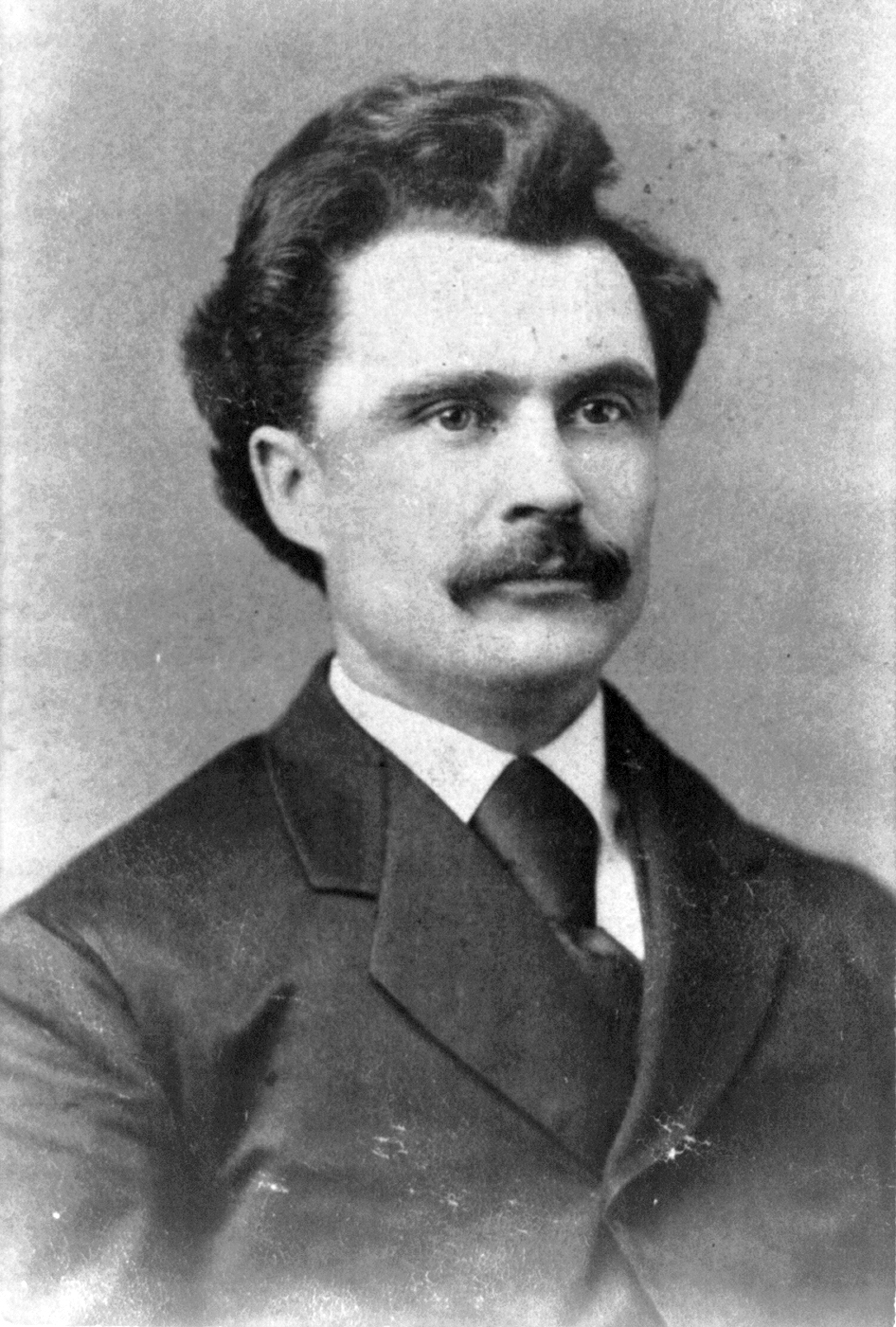
John Boyle O'Reilly

- January 7 – Bernadette Soubirous, French visionary from Lourdes (d. 1879)
- January 9 – Julián Gayarre, Spanish opera singer (d. 1890)
- January 11 – Franz Schrader, French mountaineer, geographer, cartographer and landscape painter (d. 1924)
- February 14 – Robert Themptander, 4th prime minister of Sweden (d. 1897)
- February 20
  - Joshua Slocum, Canadian-born American seaman and adventurer (d. 1909)
  - Ludwig Boltzmann, Austrian physicist (d. 1906)
- February 21 – Charles-Marie Widor, French organist, composer (d. 1937)
- February 26 – Horace Harmon Lurton, Associate Justice of the Supreme Court of the United States (d. 1914)
- February 28 – French Ensor Chadwick, American admiral (d. 1919)
- March 1 – Dirk van Raalte, American Union soldier and politician (d. 1910)
- March 10 – Pablo de Sarasate, Spanish violinist (d. 1908)
- March 14 – Umberto I, King of Italy (d. 1900)
- March 18 – Nikolai Rimsky-Korsakov, Russian composer (d. 1908)
- March 19 – Minna Canth, Finnish writer and social activist (d. 1897)
- March 25 – Adolf Engler, German botanist (d. 1930)
- March 30 – Paul Verlaine, French poet (d. 1896)

=== April–June ===
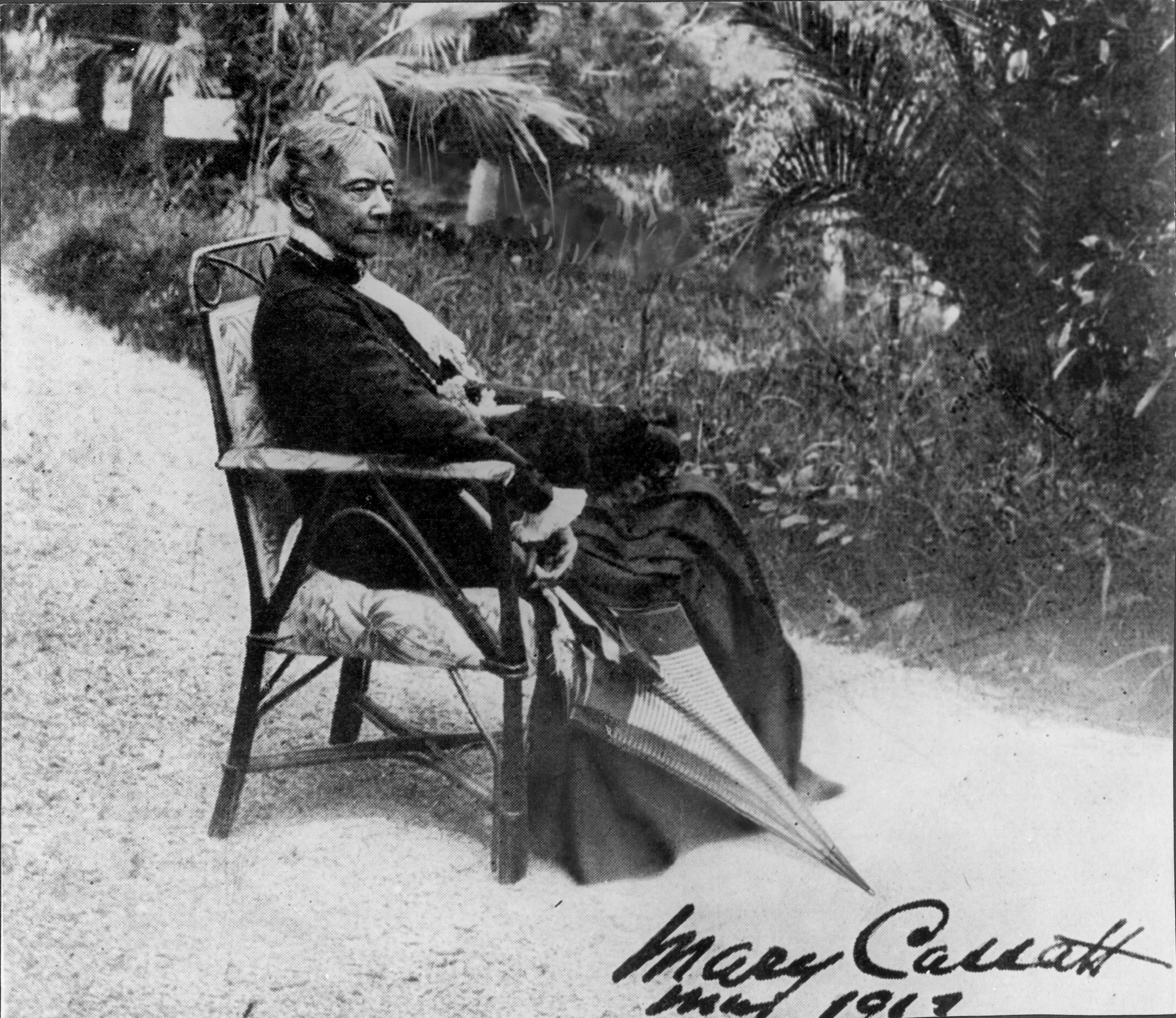
Mary Cassatt

- April 1 – Nikolai Skrydlov, Russian admiral (d. 1918)
- April 13 – John Surratt, suspect in the Abraham Lincoln assassination, son of Mary Surratt (d. 1916)
- April 16 – Anatole France, French writer, Nobel Prize laureate (d. 1924)
- April 22 – Lewis Powell, attempted assassin of United States Secretary of State William H. Seward, conspirator with John Wilkes Booth (d. 1865)
- April 26 – Lizardo García, 17th President of Ecuador (d. 1937)
- April 28 – Katarina Milovuk, Serbian educator, women's rights activist (d. 1909)
- April 29 – Hans von Koester, German admiral (d. 1928)
- May 3
  - Sarah Warren Keeler, American educator of the deaf-mute (d. 1899)
  - Kuroki Tamemoto, Japanese general (d. 1923)
- May 14 – Alexander Kaulbars, Russian general, explorer (d. 1925)
- May 19 – William M. Folger, American admiral (d. 1928)
- May 21 – Henri Rousseau, French artist (d. 1910)
- May 22 – Mary Cassatt, American painter and printmaker (d. 1926)
- May 23 – `Abdu'l-Bahá, Persian Baháʼí religious leader (d. 1921)
- June 3 – Alfred Gaselee, British general (d. 1918)
- June 6 – Konstantin Savitsky, Russian painter (d. 1905)
- June 30 – George Bengescu-Dabija, Wallachian-born Romanian poet, playwright and general (d. 1916)

=== July–September ===
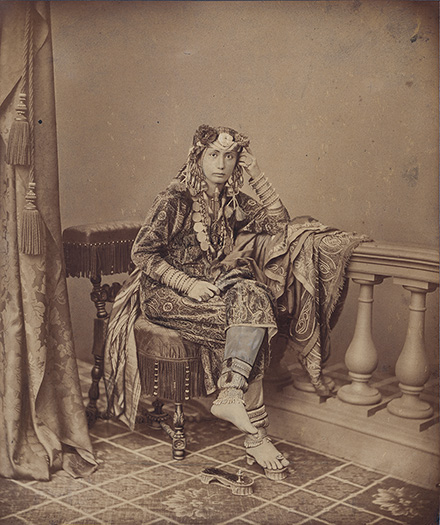
Emily Ruete

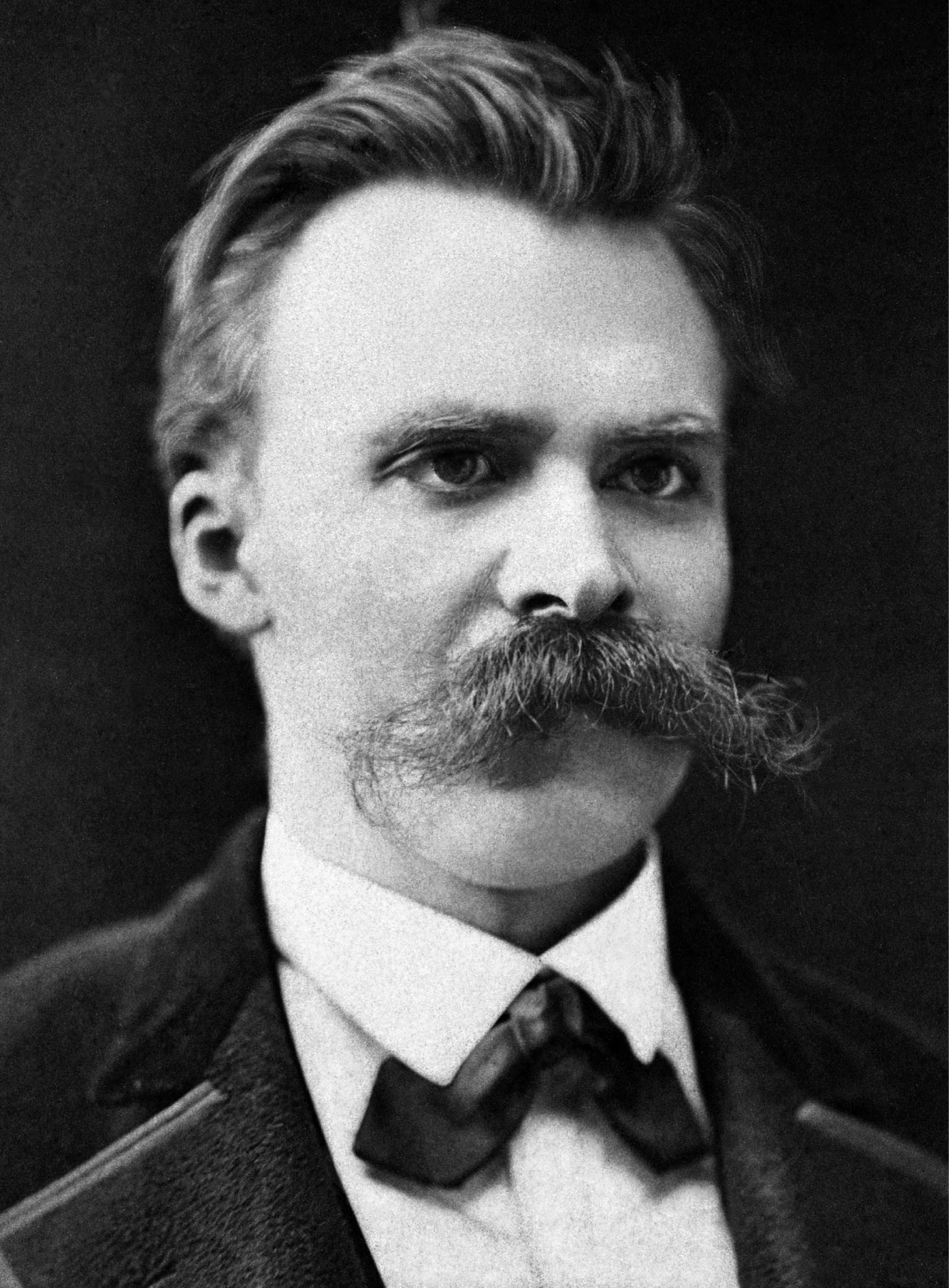
Friedrich Nietzsche

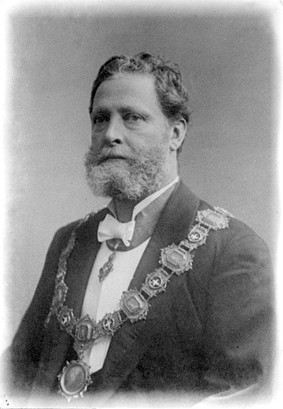
Ludwig Grillich

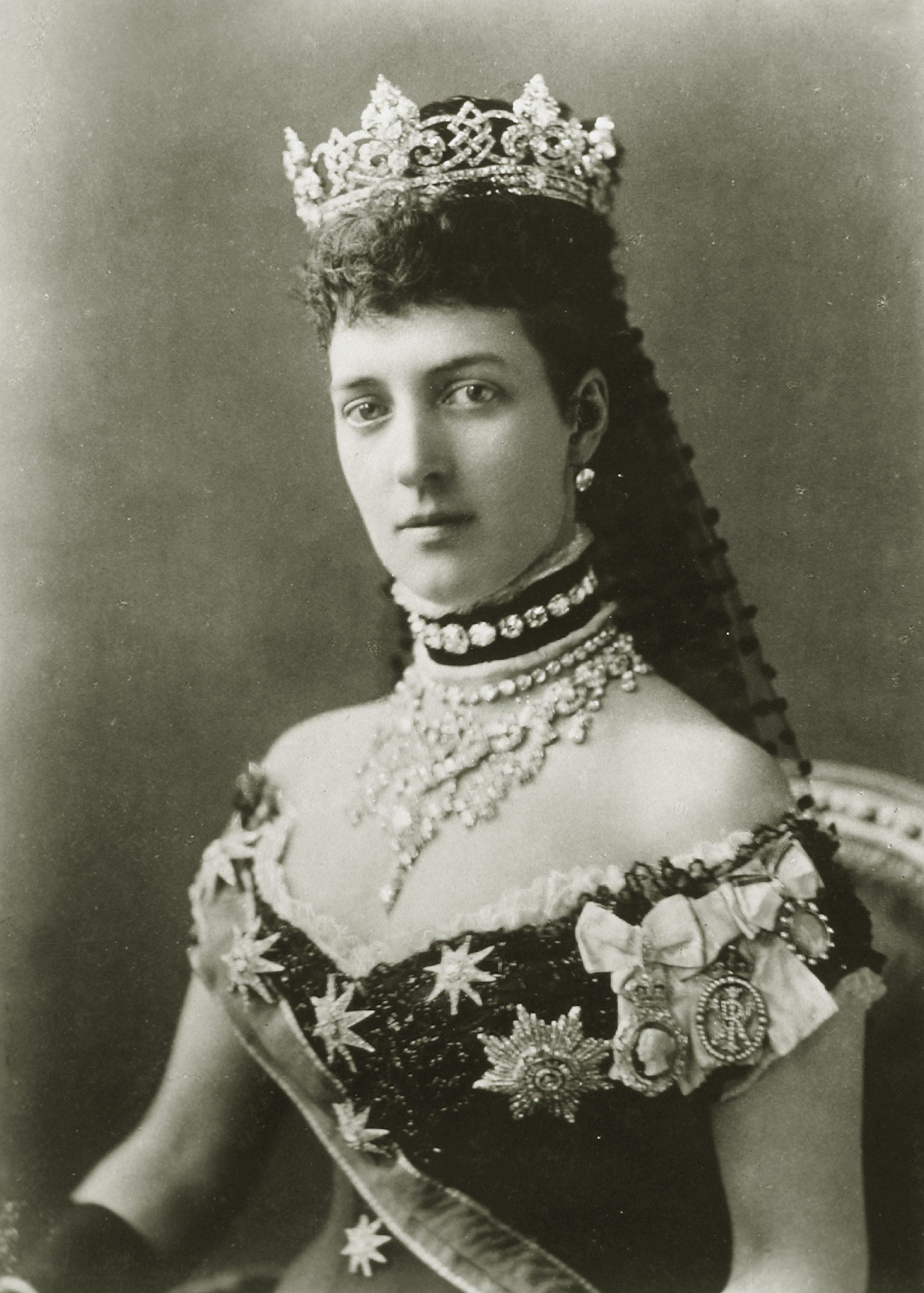
Queen Alexandra of Denmark

- July 11 – King Peter I of Serbia (d. 1921)
- July 22 – William Archibald Spooner, British scholar, Anglican priest (d. 1930)
- July 25 – Thomas Eakins, American painter, sculptor (d. 1916)
- July 26 – Deodato Arellano, Filipino Propagandist (d. 1899)
- July 28 – Gerard Manley Hopkins, English poet (d. 1889)
- July 30 – Robert Jones Burdette, American minister, sentimental humorist (d. 1914)
- August 5
  - Ilya Repin, Russian painter, sculptor (d. 1930)
  - Philip H. Cooper, American admiral (d. 1912)
- August 6 – Alfred, Duke of Saxe-Coburg and Gotha (d. 1900)
- August 17 – Menelik II, Emperor of Ethiopia (d. 1913)
- August 20 – Mutsu Munemitsu, Japanese statesman, diplomat (d. 1897)
- August 22 – George W. De Long, American naval officer, explorer (d. 1881)
- August 23 – Hamilton Disston, American land developer (d. 1896)
- August 25 – Ramón Auñón y Villalón, Spanish admiral and politician (d. 1925)
- August 29 – Edward Carpenter, English socialist poet (d. 1929)
- August 30 – Emily Ruete, Princess of Zanzibar (d. 1924)
- September 7 – Charles Romley Alder Wright, British chemist (d. 1894)
- September 13 – Ludwig von Falkenhausen, German general (d. 1936)
- September 16 – Claude-Paul Taffanel, French flutist, composer (d. 1908)
- September 20 – William H. Illingworth, English photographer (d. 1893)
- September 24 – Max Noether, German mathematician (d. 1921)
- September 28 – Sir Robert Stout, 2-time prime minister of New Zealand (d. 1930)
- September 29 – Miguel Ángel Juárez Celman, 10th President of Argentina (d. 1909)

=== October–December ===
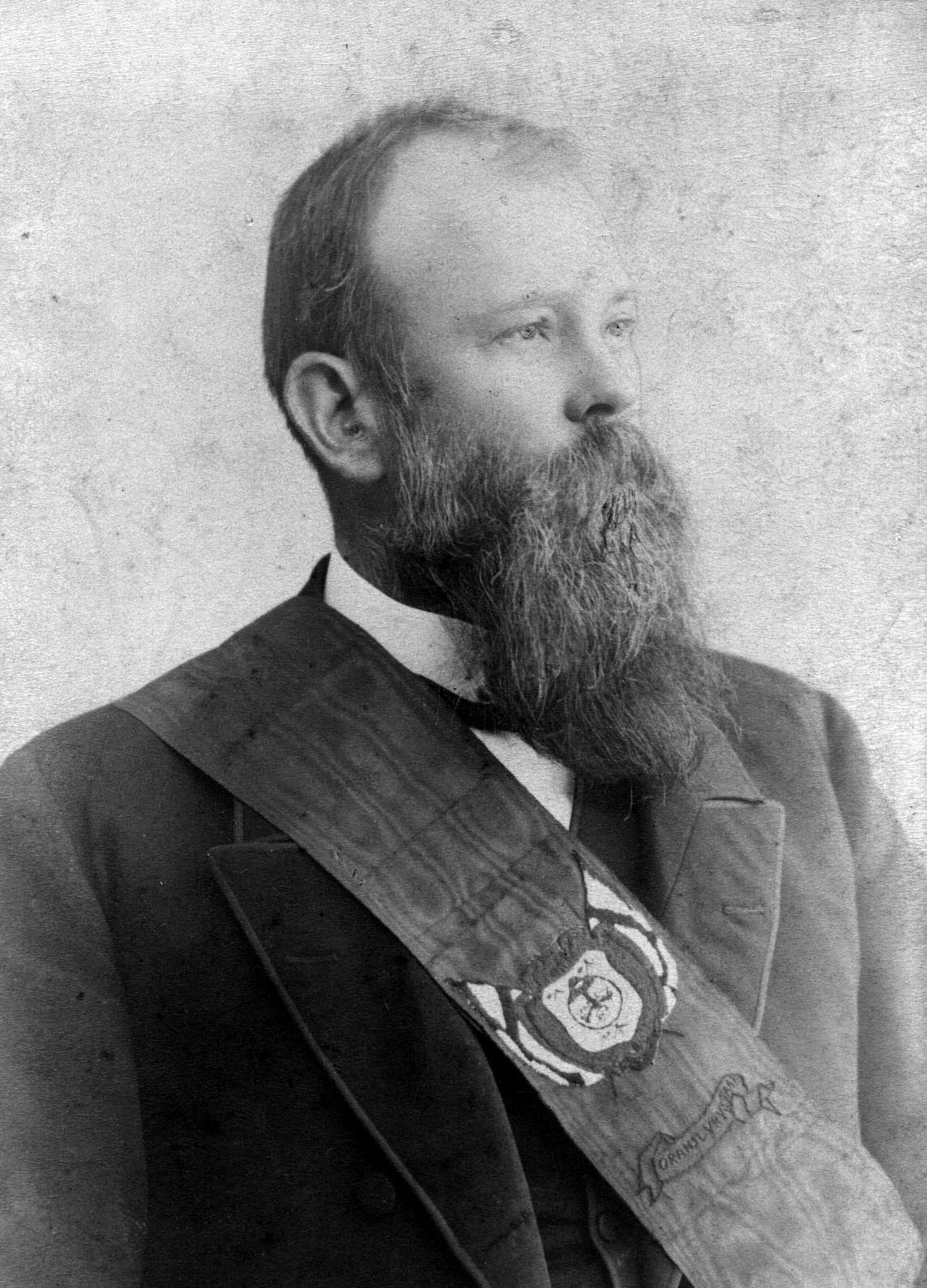
Francis William Reitz

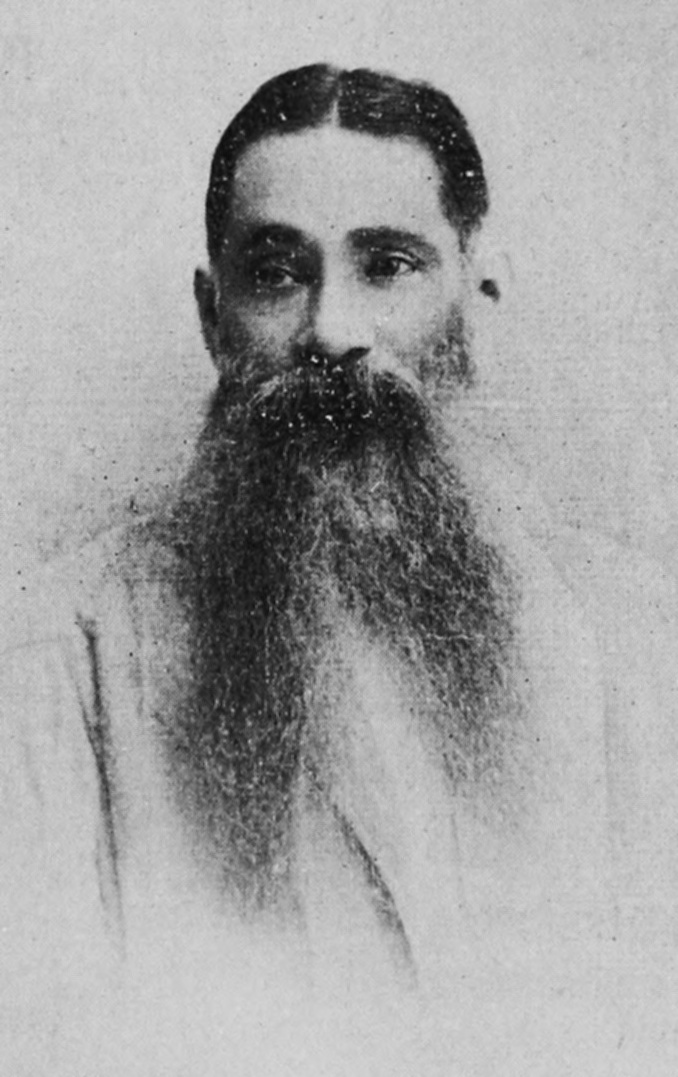
W.C. Bonnerjee

- October 5 – Francis William Reitz, 5th State President of the Orange Free State (d. 1934)
- October 11 – Henry J. Heinz, American businessman (d. 1919)
- October 15 – Friedrich Nietzsche, German philosopher (d. 1900)
- October 16 – Ismail Kemal, Albanian politician and statesman, 1st Prime Minister of Albania (d. 1919)
- October 22 – Louis Riel, Canadian-American leader (d. 1885)
- October 23
  - Robert Bridges, English poet (d. 1930)
  - Sarah Bernhardt, French actress (d. 1923)
- October 24 – Karl Lueger, Austrian politician, Mayor of Vienna (d. 1910)
- October 27 – Klas Pontus Arnoldson, Swedish writer, pacifist, recipient of the Nobel Peace Prize (d. 1916)
- November 2 – Mehmed V, Ottoman Sultan (d. 1918)
- November 3 – Manuel Macías y Casado, Spanish general (d. 1937)
- November 10 – Henry Eyster Jacobs, American Lutheran theologian (d. 1932)
- November 11 – Marcelino Crisologo, Filipino politician, playwright, writer and poet (d. 1927)
- November 13 – Andrew Harper, Scottish-Australian biblical scholar, teacher (d. 1936)
- November 25 – Karl Benz, German automotive pioneer (d. 1929)
- December 1 – Alexandra of Denmark, Queen of Edward VII of the United Kingdom (d. 1925)
- December 8 – Charles-Émile Reynaud, French science teacher, animation pioneer (d. 1918)
- December 10 - Edward Loines Pemberton, British philatelist (d. 1878)
- December 18 – Takashima Tomonosuke, Japanese general (d. 1916)
- December 29 – Womesh Chunder Bonnerjee, Indian independence activist and barrister (d. 1906)

=== Date unknown ===
- probable – Abdur Rahman Khan, Emir of Kabul, Emir of Kandahar, Emir of Afghanistan (d. 1901)
- approximate – Timothy, Ottoman-born female supercentenarian tortoise (d. 2004)

== Deaths ==
=== January–June ===
- January 25 – Jean-Baptiste Drouet, Comte d'Erlon, French marshal (b. 1765)
- January 27
  - Charles Nodier, French writer (b. 1780)
  - Wiliam Gadsby, English Strict Baptist leader (b. 1773)
- January 28 – Johannes van den Bosch, Governor-General of the Dutch East Indies (b. 1780)
- January 29 – Ernest I, Duke of Saxe-Coburg and Gotha (b. 1784)
- February 3 – Frederick Ponsonby, 3rd Earl of Bessborough (b. 1758)
- February 15 – Henry Addington, 1st Viscount Sidmouth, Prime Minister of the United Kingdom (b. 1757)
- February 27 – Nicholas Biddle, president of the Second Bank of the United States (b. 1786)
- March – Carlota, Cuban slave rebel leader
- March 6 – Gabriel Duvall, American politician and Associate Justice of the Supreme Court of the United States (b. 1752)
- March 8 – King Charles XIV John of Sweden-Norway, Jean-Baptiste Bernadotte, French Napoleonic general (b. 1763)
- March 20 – Claude Pierre Pajol, French military leader (b. 1772)
- April 3 – Edward Bigge, English cleric, 1st Archdeacon of Lindisfarne (b. 1807)
- April 13 – Mamiya Rinzō, Japanese explorer of Sakhalin (b. 1775)
- April 17 – James Scarlett Abinger, English judge (b. 1769)
- May 18 – Richard McCarty, American politician (b. 1780)
- June 13 – Thomas Charles Hope, Scottish chemist, discoverer of strontium (b. 1766)
- June 15 – Thomas Campbell, Scottish poet (b. 1777)
- June 27
  - Hyrum Smith, American Latter Day Saint leader (b. 1800)
  - Joseph Smith, American founder of the Latter Day Saint movement (b. 1805)

=== July–December ===
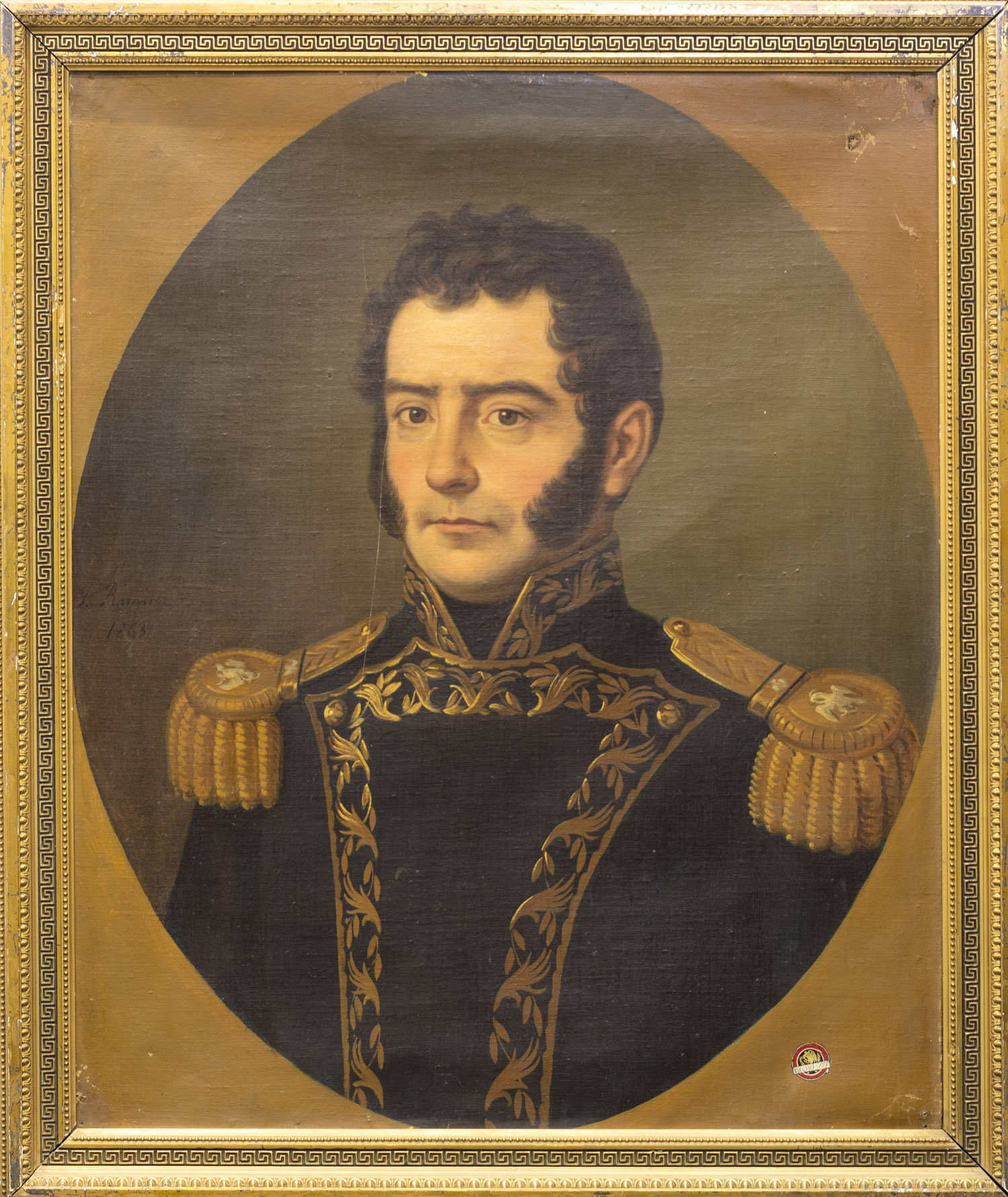
Melchor Múzquiz

- July 11 – Yevgeny Baratynsky, Russian poet, philosopher (b. 1800)
- July 27 – John Dalton, English chemist, physicist (b. 1766)
- July 28 – Joseph Bonaparte, brother of Napoleon, King of Naples and Spain (b. 1768)
- July 29 – Franz Xaver Wolfgang Mozart, Austrian composer (b. 1791)
- August 2 – Pieter Merkus, Governor-General of the Dutch East Indies (b. 1787)
- September ? – Robert Taylor, English-born Radical writer, freethought advocate (b. 1784)
- November 14 – Flora Tristan, French feminist (b. 1803)
- November 29 – Princess Sophia of Gloucester (b. 1773)
- December 2 – Eustachy Erazm Sanguszko, Polish military leader (b. 1768)
- December 14 – Melchor Múzquiz, 5th President of Mexico (b. 1790)
- December 20 Nathan of Breslov (b. 1779)
- December 24 – Friedrich Bernhard Westphal, Danish-German painter (b. 1803)

=== Date unknown ===
- Zheng Yi Sao, Chinese woman pirate (b. 1775)
