= 1944 San Juan earthquake =

Earthquake in Argentina

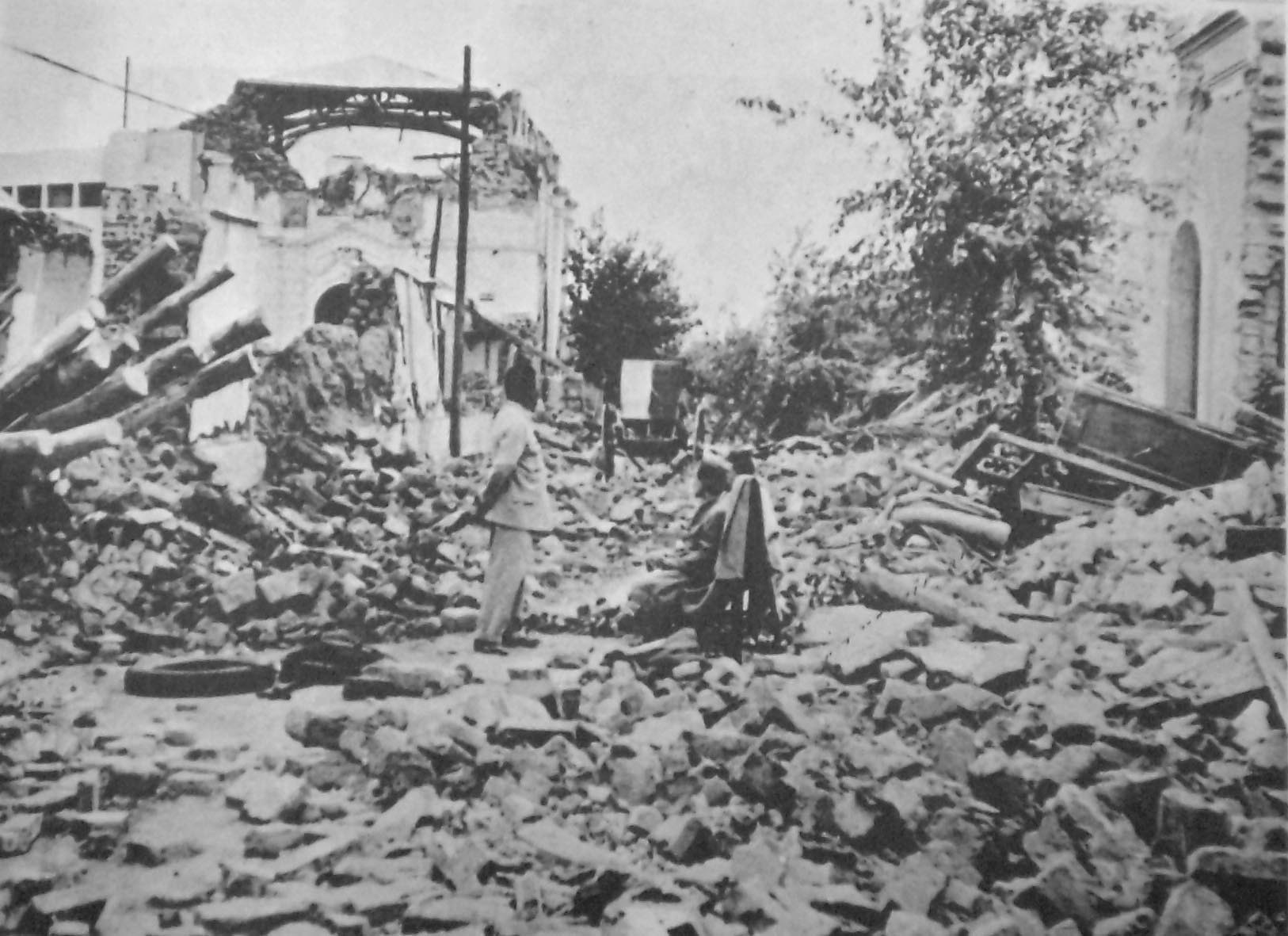
- Damage in San Juan following the earthquake

- Location within Argentina
- UTC time: 1944-01-15 23:49:32
- ISC event: 899270
- USGS-ANSS: ComCat
- Local date: January 15, 1944
- Local time: 20:49
- Magnitude: 7.0 M_{w}
- Epicenter: 31.372°S 68.436°W
- Fault: La Laya fault
- Type: reverse
- Areas affected: Argentina, San Juan
- Max. intensity: MMI IX (Violent)
- Casualties: 10,000 killed

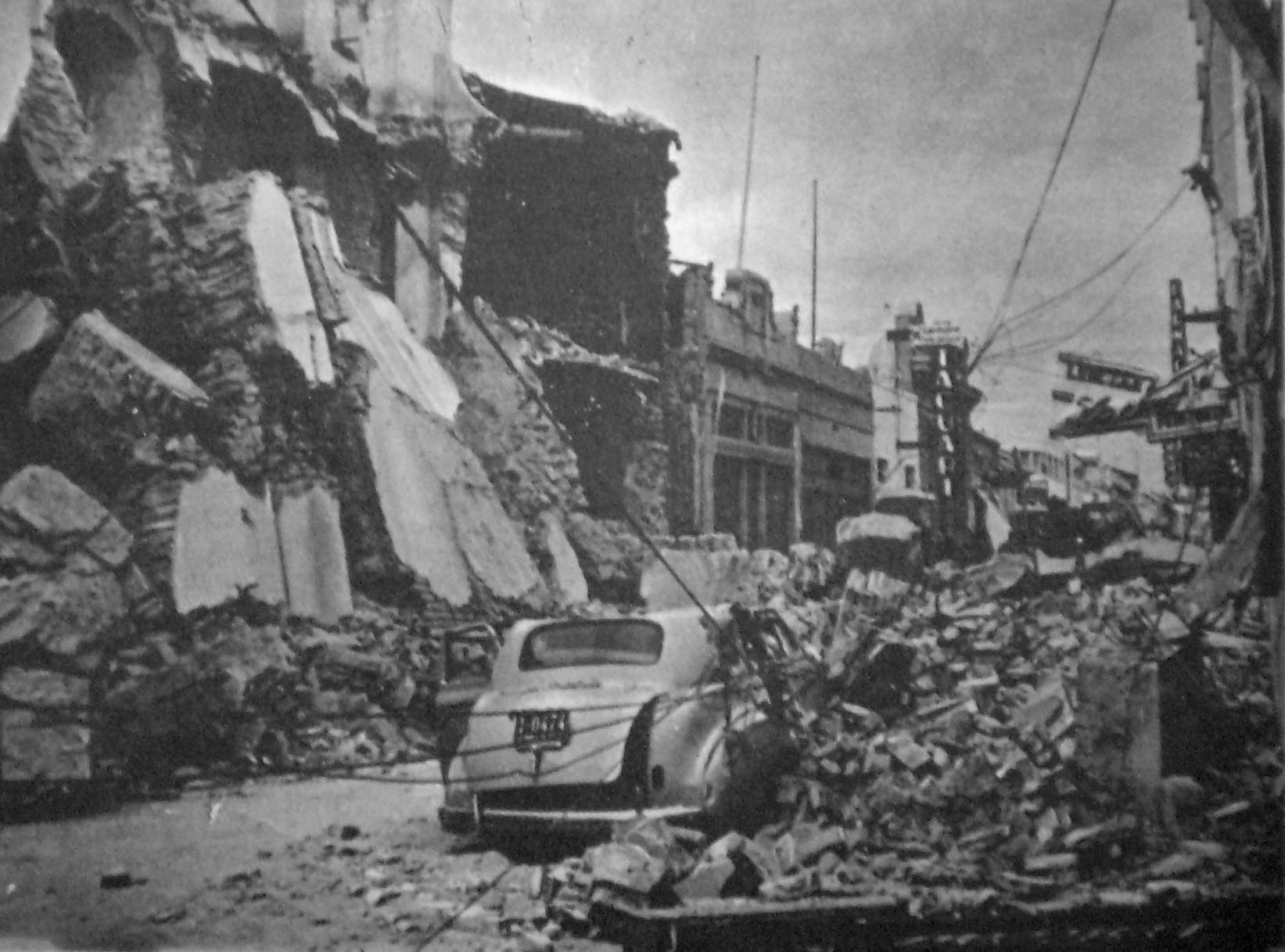
Wreckage in downtown San Juan in the wake of the 1944 quake

The 1944 San Juan earthquake took place on 15 January in the province of San Juan, in the center-west area of Argentina, a region highly prone to seismic events. This moderate to strong earthquake (estimated moment magnitudes range from 6.7 to 7.8) destroyed a large part of San Juan, the provincial capital, and killed 10,000 of its inhabitants, 10 percent of its population at the time. One third of the province population became homeless. It is acknowledged as the worst natural disaster in Argentine history.

The earthquake occurred at 8:49 pm on 15 January 1944 and had its epicenter 30 km north of the provincial capital, near La Laja in Albardón Department. Some 90% of the buildings in the city were destroyed and those left standing suffered such damage that in most cases they had to be demolished. It is considered that the reason for such widespread destruction was the low quality of construction, rather than just the power of the earthquake.

In 1944, many of San Juan's houses were made of adobe and the reconstruction programme prompted the creation of a building code that took into account contemporary knowledge of earthquakes and their effect on buildings. Stronger bricks were used, concrete single-story houses were erected, and sidewalks and streets were made wider.

== Geology ==
The 15 January 1944 shock represented rupture of a fault within the crust of the South American plate. Several other large earthquakes have occurred in the San Juan region in 1894, 1952 and 1977 at depths no greater than 35 km (22 mi). The mainshock generated a 6–8 km (3.7–5.0 mi) fault scarp along the La Laja Fault in the Precordillera region. This region displays thin-skinned deformation as a result of the fold and thrust belt beneath the area. It is not fully understood if the La Laja Fault, a reverse fault, was the dominant or secondary structure that ruptured during the earthquake. The La Laja Fault is part of a larger thrust system in the Precordillera. The earthquake's focal mechanism suggests rupture occurred along a north–south striking, east-dipping fault corresponding to the La Laja Fault. In San Juan, the maximum Modified Mercalli intensity was IX (Violent), as was in Albardón.

== Aid and reconstruction ==
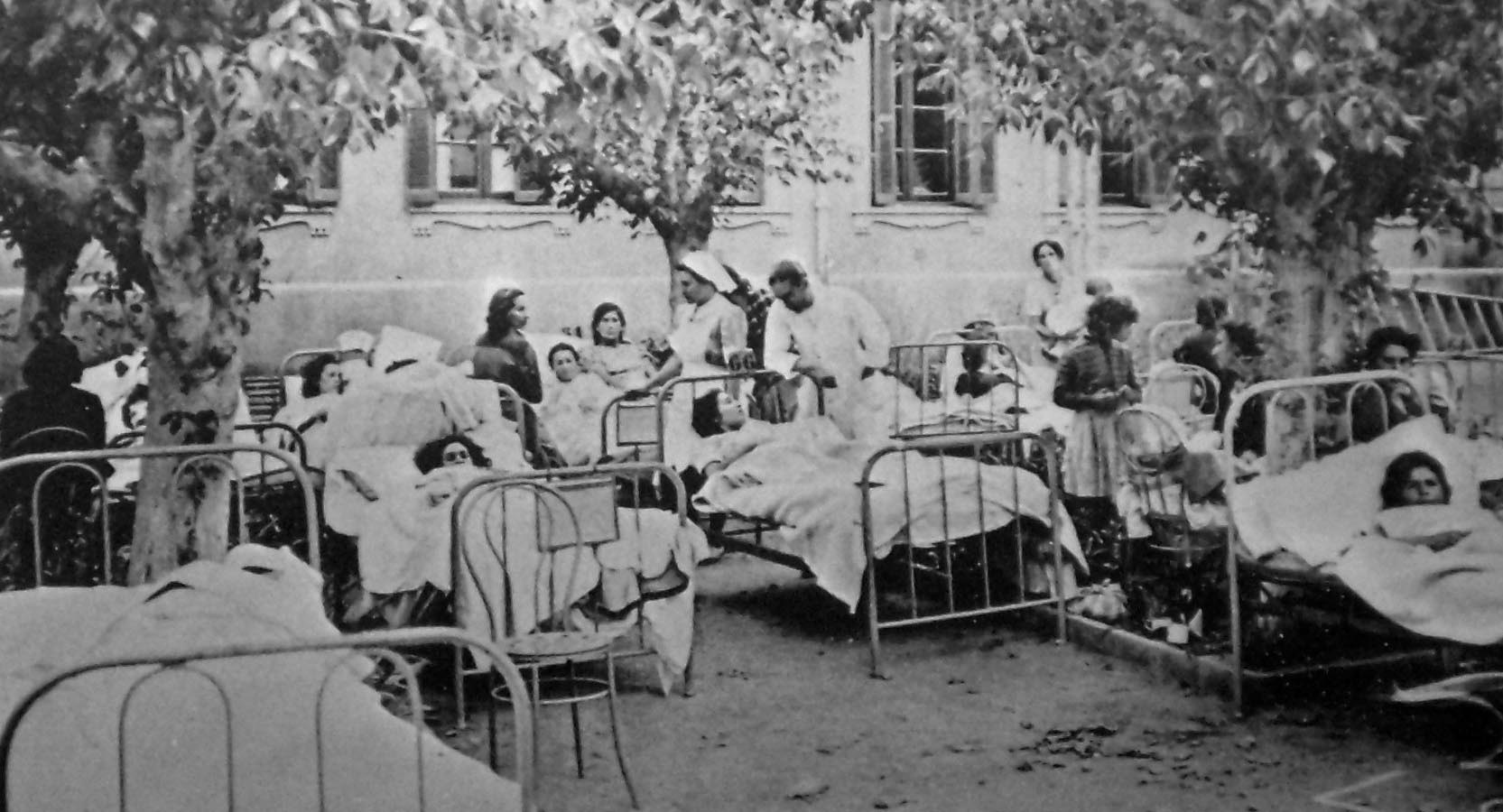
The injured are tended to following the collapse of the city hospital

There was some debate as to whether it would be advisable to rebuild the city in the same place, or to take advantage of the situation to move it to a less earthquake prone location. The former alternative was adopted.

At the start of the reconstruction, emergency homes were built for the population with funds from the national state. This was the first large-scale state-directed construction plan in Argentina, the first stages of which occurred under Peronist rule. Colonel Juan Perón, later to become president, had met his future wife Eva Duarte, during fundraising activities to help the victims. After the 1955 coup d'état ousted Perón, the reconstruction was continued under the de facto President Pedro Eugenio Aramburu.

The earthquake caused many families to scatter in the confusion, and left around 1,000 orphaned children. According to historian Mark Healey, the issues surrounding the orphans and the nearly 100,000 homeless had a profound influence on the shaping of social legislation enacted during Perón's first term as president, two years later.

== The modern city ==
As of 2006, San Juan has a population of around 400,000, and 63% of its approximately 90,000 homes, and 100% of its public institutional buildings, were built under seismic safety regulations. This, however, leaves almost a third of houses as non-seismic-resistant.

A study of the seismic vulnerability of the city, conducted by the National University of San Juan in 2005, showed that 28% of the outlying neighborhoods present medium risk, and 20% of the city itself can be classified as high or very high vulnerability.

== See also ==
- List of earthquakes in 1944
- List of earthquakes in Argentina
