= 1844 Salta earthquake =

Earthquake

- Location within Argentina
- Local date: 18 October 1844
- Local time: 23:00 UTC
- Magnitude: 6.5 M_{s}
- Epicenter: 24.80°S 64.7°W
- Areas affected: Salta, Argentina
- Max. intensity: MMI VII (Very strong)
- Casualties: unknown

The 1844 Salta earthquake took place in the Province of Salta, in the Republic of Argentina, on 18 October at 23:00 UTC. Reports estimated a magnitude of 6.5 M_{s}, and a hypocentral depth of 30 km.

== Damage and casualties ==
The Province of Salta is an area of high seismic activity. The last major earthquake to have affected the area prior to the October 1844 event was in 1692. The destructive force of the 1844 Salta earthquake was measured at VII on the Mercalli intensity scale, impacting several villages and the capital city. Despite the damage, no loss of life was reported. The shockwaves were also experienced in Jujuy, Tucumán, and Santiago del Estero. Several aftershocks were felt after the initial tremor, creating new channels through which water flowed until October 26th. The final aftershock was felt the next day.

== Aftermath ==
During the quake, the villagers rushed to the main square, then towards the Cathedral, moving the statues of Christ and the Virgen del Milagro to the plaza. There, they prostrated before the images and prayed.

Although the Fiesta del Milagro has its origins in the 1692 Salta earthquake, in which the images of Christ and the Virgen del Milagro were said to have saved the city from the earthquakes, it was not until 1845, a year following the 1844 earthquake, that ecclesiastical authorities along with the Government of the Province, signed the so-called Pact of Allegiance (Pacta de Fidelidad). In this pact, the village agreed to officiate the acts of the Fiesta de Milagro (Feast of the Miracle), with novena and processions on 15th September each year. The primitive "Fiestas del Milagro" in Salta was filled with celebration and excess, but it was from 1935, after the severe restrictions imposed by Archbishop Tavella, that these "excesses" were banned and the feast took on the character of penance and atonement.

== See also ==
- List of earthquakes in Argentina
- List of historical earthquakes
