= List of earthquakes in Argentina =

This is a list of earthquakes in Argentina.

- Details are approximate for older events.
- Magnitude is measured on the Richter scale.
- Intensity is measured on the Mercalli intensity scale.
- Depth is given in kilometres.

== 1600–1899 ==
	Date	Time	Mag.	Intensity	Epicenter	Depth	Death toll	Sources
1692 Salta earthquake	1692-09-13	11:00:00 a.m.	7.0	IX	25°23′59″S 64°47′59″W	30	13	
1782 Mendoza earthquake	1782-05-22	4:00:00 p.m.	7.0	VIII	33°00′00″S 69°12′0″W	30	-	
1817 Santiago del Estero earthquake	1817-07-04	5:30:00 p.m.	7.0	VIII	28°00′00″S 64°30′0″W	30	-	
1826 Trancas earthquake	1826-01-19	8:00:00 a.m.	6.4	VIII	26°11′59″S 65°15′00″W	30	2	
1844 Salta earthquake	1844-10-18	11:00:00 p.m.	6.5	VII	24°48′00″S 64°42′00″W	30	-	
1861 Mendoza earthquake	1861-03-20	11:00:00 p.m.	7.2	IX-X	32°53′59″S 68°54′00″W	30	4247	
1863 Jujuy earthquake	1863-01-14	11:00:00 a.m.	6.4	VIII	23°36′00″S 65°00′00″W	30	-	
1871 Orán earthquake	1871-10-09	2:15:00 a.m.	6.4	VIII	23°6′00″S 64°17′59″W	30	20	
1874 Orán earthquake	1874-07-06	7:00:00 p.m.	6.0	VII	23°00′00″S 64°12′00″W	30	-	
1880 Tunuyan earthquake	1880-08-19	9:30:00 p.m.	5.5	VI	33°00′00″S 69°00′00″W	30	1	
1888 Río de la Plata earthquake	1888-06-05	3:20:00 a.m.	5.5	VI	34°36′00″S 57°53′59″W	30	-	
1892 Recreo earthquake	1892-03-21	1:45:00 a.m.	6.0	VII	29°30′00″S 65°00′00″W	30	-	
1894 San Juan earthquake	1894-10-27	7:30:00 p.m.	7.5	IX	29°48′00″S 69°00′00″W	30	58	
1898 Catamarca earthquake	1898-02-05	12:57:00 a.m.	6.4	VIII	28°26′59″S 66°09′00″W	30	-	
1899 Yacuiba earthquake	1899-03-23	8:00:00 a.m.	6.4	VIII	22°06′00″S 63°47′59″W	30	3	
1899 La Rioja earthquake	1899-04-12	4:10:00 p.m.	6.4	VIII	28°38′59″S 68°24′00″W	30	11	

== 20th century ==
	Date	Time	Mag.	Intensity	Epicenter	Depth	Death toll	Sources
1903 Mendoza earthquake	1903-08-12	11:00:00 p.m.	6.0	VII	32°06′00″S 69°05′59″W	70	7	
1906 Tafí del Valle earthquake	1906-11-17	4:30:00 p.m.	6.0	VII	26°45′00″S 65°42′00″W	30	-	
1907 Tucumán earthquake	1907-08-11	1:15:00 a.m.	5.5	VI	27°11′59″S 65°30′00″W	30	-	
1908 Salta earthquake	1908-02-05	8:50:00 p.m.	6.0	VII	25°11′59″S 64°42′00″W	30	-	
1908 Cruz del Eje earthquake	1908-09-22	5:00:00 p.m.	6.5	VII	30°30′00″S 64°30′00″W	100	-	
1913 Tucumán earthquake	1913-11-06	4:45:00 p.m.	5.5	VI	26°48′00″S 65°05′59″W	30	-	
1917 Mendoza earthquake	1917-07-27	2:51:40 a.m.	6.5	VII	32°17′59″S 68°54′00″W	50	2	
1920 Mendoza earthquake	1920-12-17	6:59:49 p.m.	6.0	VIII	32°42′00″S 68°24′00″W	40	250	
1927 Mendoza earthquake	1927-04-14	6:23:28 a.m.	7.1	VIII	32°00′00″S 69°30′00″W	110	2	
1929 Mendoza earthquake	1929-05-23	5:04:00 a.m.	5.7	VI	32°53′59″S 68°54′00″W	30	-	
1929 Southern Mendoza earthquake	1929-05-30	9:43:24 a.m.	6.8	VIII	35°00′00″S 68°00′00″W	40	40	
1930 La Poma earthquake	1930-12-24	6:02:50 a.m.	6.0	VIII	24°41′59″S 66°17′59″W	30	33	
1931 El Naranjo earthquake	1931-04-03	3:19:06 a.m.	6.3	VII	27°00′00″S 65°00′00″W	180	-	
1933 Tucumán earthquake	1933-02-12	4:05:00 a.m.	5.5	VI	26°36′00″S 65°20′59″W	30	-	
1934 Sampacho earthquake	1934-06-11	3:07:09 a.m.	6.0	VIII	33°30′00″S 64°30′00″W	30	-	
1936 San Luis earthquake	1936-05-22	12:15:58 a.m.	6.0	VIII	32°00′00″S 66°00′00″W	40	-	
1941 San Juan earthquake	1941-07-03	7:11:43 a.m.	6.2	VII	31°48′00″S 67°47′59″W	20	2	
1944 San Juan earthquake	1944-01-15	11:49:27 p.m.	7.4	IX	31°23′59″S 68°24′00″W	30	10000	
1947 Córdoba earthquake	1947-01-16	2:37:40 a.m.	5.5	VII	31°06′00″S 64°30′00″W	50	-	
1948 Corrientes earthquake	1948-01-21	4:47:40 p.m.	5.5	VI	30°30′00″S 58°00′00″W	30	-	
1948 Salta earthquake	1948-08-25	6:09:23 a.m.	7.0	IX	24°53′59″S 64°47′59″W	50	2	
1949 Tierra del Fuego earthquakess	1949-12-17	6:53:30 a.m.	7.7	VIII	54°00′00″S 68°46′11″W	30	1	
1952 San Juan earthquake	1952-06-11	12:31:37 a.m.	7.0	VIII	31°36′00″S 68°35′59″W	30	2	
1955 Villa Giardino earthquake	1955-05-28	6:20:41 a.m.	7.3	VI	31°02′00″S 64°29′00″W	25	-	
1957 Villa Castelli earthquake	1957-10-24	8:07:21 p.m.	6.0	VII	28°53′59″S 68°00′00″W	37	-	
1959 San Andrés earthquake	1959-05-12	9:46:55 a.m.	6.8	VIII	23°10′47″S 64°39′00″W	100	-	
1966 Belén earthquake	1966-10-21	12:39:39 p.m.	5.0	VII	27°43′11″S 62°20′24″W	50	-	
1966 Tartagal earthquake	1966-10-30	5:43:52 a.m.	4.8	VI	22°25′12″S 63°53′59″W	20	-	
1966 San Juan earthquake	1966-11-10	3:02:32 a.m.	5.9	VI	31°56′59″S 68°24′00″W	110	-	
1967 Mendoza earthquake	1967-04-25	10:36:15 a.m.	5.4	VI	32°43′11″S 69°10′12″W	45	-	
1968 Chaco earthquake	1968-10-15	7:54:20 p.m.	5.0	VI	26°52′12″S 60°52′48″W	70	-	
1972 San Juan earthquake	1972-09-26	9:05:43 p.m.	5.8	VI	30°53′59″S 68°12′35″W	17	-	
1973 Catamarca earthquake	1973-11-03	2:17:38 p.m.	5.8	VI	25°58′48″S 67°42′35″W	27	-	
1973 Salta earthquake	1973-11-19	11:19:32 a.m.	5.9	VII	24°34′12″S 64°34′47″W	12	-	
1974 Orán earthquake	1974-08-17	10:08:46 p.m.	5.0	VII	23°18′00″S 64°24′00″W	30	-	
1977 La Rioja earthquake	1977-06-07	1:31:23 p.m.	5.1	VII	29°44′23″S 67°47′59″W	102	-	
1977 San Juan earthquake	1977-11-23	9:26:23 a.m.	7.4	IX	31°02′23″S 67°45′36″W	17	65	
1977 San Juan earthquake (aftershock)	1977-12-06	5:05:06 p.m.	5.9	VI	31°13′48″S 67°54′00″W	21	-	
1978 San Juan earthquake (aftershock)	1978-01-17	11:33:14 a.m.	5.7	VI	31°15′00″S 67°59′23″W	20	-	
1981 Tucumán earthquake	1981-05-09	9:50:39 a.m.	5.0	VI	26°34′12″S 64°53′24″W	38	-	
1985 Mendoza earthquake	1985-01-26	3:07:00 a.m.	6.2	VIII	33°07′11″S 68°49′11″W	12	6	
1992 Timbo Viejo earthquake	1992-02-29	4:17:19 p.m.	5.2	VI	26°40′47″S 64°55′48″W	23	-	
1993 San Juan earthquake	1993-06-08	11:17:41 p.m.	6.5	VI	31°33′35″S 69°13′48″W	113	-	
1993 San Juan earthquake	1993-10-30	5:59:02 p.m.	5.9	VI	31°41′59″S 68°13′48″W	107	-	
1993 San Francisco earthquake	1993-12-17	5:30:26 a.m.	4.3	VI	23°33′35″S 65°00′36″W	60	-	
1997 Santiago del Estero earthquake	1997-06-17	7:15:00 p.m.	5.5	VI	27°44′38″S 64°45′11″W	28.2	-	

== 21st century ==
	Date	Time	Mag.	Intensity	Epicenter	Depth	Death toll	Sources
2002 La Rioja earthquake	2002-05-28	1:04:28 a.m.	6.0	VIII	29°56′13″S 66°47′49″W	22	-	
2004 Catamarca earthquake	2004-09-07	8:53:00 a.m.	6.4	VII	28.573°S 65.840°W	22	1	
2006 Mendoza earthquake	2006-08-05	11:03:00 a.m.	5.7	V-VI	33°13′S 68°57′W	22	-	
2009 Jujuy earthquake	2009-11-06	5:49:00 a.m.	5.5	V-VI	23°30′21″S 64°33′43″W	5	-	
2010 Ushuaia earthquake	2010-01-17	8:00:00 a.m.	6.5	VII	58°05′49″S 66°39′04″W	5	-	
2010 Salta earthquake	2010-02-27	12:45:00 a.m.	6.1	VII	24°35′16.8″S 65°25′55.2″W	24	2	
2011 Santiago del Estero earthquake	2011-01-1	17:28:15 UTC	7.0	VII	26.758°S 63.103°W	592.9	-	
2015 El Galpon earthquake	2015-10-17	11:33:09 UTC	5.8	VI	25.467°S 64.484°W	17	1	
2021 San Juan earthquake	2021-01-19	02:46:22 UTC	6.4	VII	31.833°S 68.799°W	20.8	-	
2025 Drake Passage earthquake	2025-05-02	12:58:26 UTC	M_{w} 7.4	V	56.782°S 68.209°W	10		

== See also ==
- List of earthquakes in Mendoza Province
