= Tokachi earthquake =

Tokachi earthquake (十勝沖地震) may refer to:

- 1952 Tokachi earthquake
- 1968 Tokachi earthquake
- 2003 Tokachi earthquake
