= 1888 Río de la Plata earthquake =

Earthquake between Argentina and Uruguay

- Location within Uruguay
- UTC time: 1888-06-05
- Local date: 5 June 1888
- Magnitude: 5.5 M_{s}
- Depth: 30 kilometres (19 mi)
- Epicenter: 34°36′S 57°54′W
- Type: Intraplate
- Areas affected: Argentina, Uruguay
- Max. intensity: MMI VI (Strong)
- Tsunami: Yes

The 1888 Río de la Plata earthquake occurred on 5 June measuring 5.5 on the Richter scale, and shook the upper Río de la Plata at 3:20 UTC-3. The epicentre was located 15 kilometres (9 mi) southwest of Colonia del Sacramento (Uruguay) and 42 kilometres (26 mi) east of Buenos Aires (Argentina), with a hypocentre at a depth of 30 kilometres (19 mi).

== Newspaper articles ==
On 5 June 1888, the Montevideo journal La Tribuna Popular reported the earthquake and its effects: The houses' woodwork creaked loudly, lamps swung, furniture moved and paintings fell off walls. Glassware objects broke and porcelain could be seen jolting out of cupboards. Astonished at the strong earthquake, inhabitants have had a sleepless night...

Also, a Colonia del Sacramento local journal La Lucha reported on a particular event: The steamer 'Saturno' en route from the neighbouring country's capital (Buenos Aires) was calmly sailing in 20 feet (6 m) of water along the centre of the channel when she came to a sudden halt, as though she had run aground. The captain had soundings taken but the vessel, as if moved by some hidden force, was freed from the ground and continued on her way.

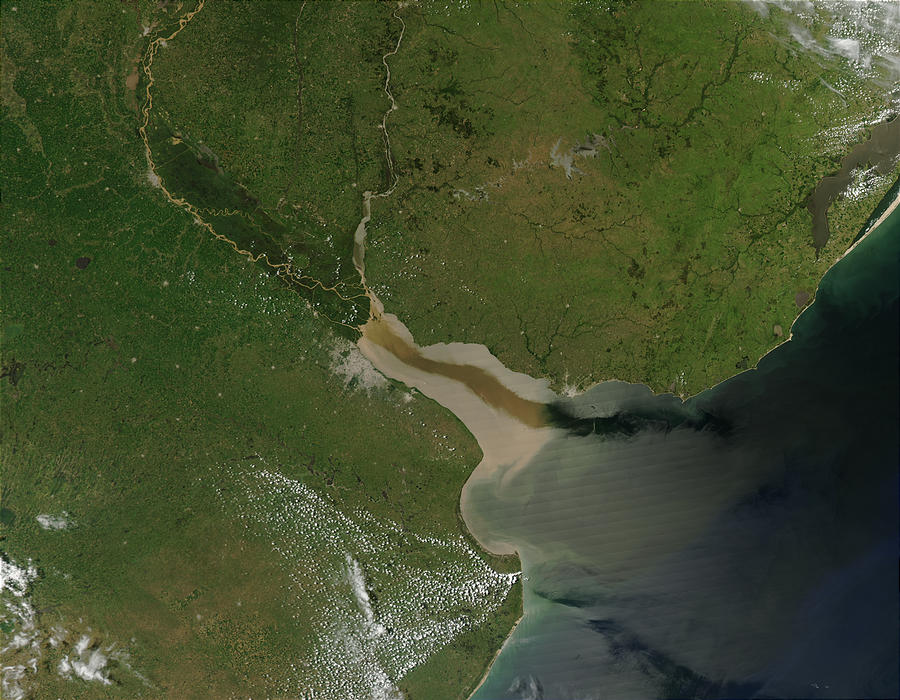
Satellite view of the estuary of the Río de la Plata. North bank:Uruguay. South bank: Argentina

== Consequences ==
Every settlement along the Río de la Plata's shore was affected, especially the cities of Buenos Aires and Montevideo. Only slight damage occurred since there were no high buildings or underground trains in those cities at the time. However, at no time since this earthquake have antiseismic building measures been taken in either of the two nations.

== Background, precedents and provisions ==
The panic caused by this earthquake among the inhabitants of both banks of Río de la Plata was marked, because they were unfamiliar with seismic events, as are today's inhabitants. However, a previous event had been recorded: the 15 August 1848 earthquake which, just as that of 1888, caused no major damage and may have been seen as an isolated phenomenon or since its epicentre was faraway from the continent and thus distant from settlements, it may have been considered that future quakes would probably occur in those latitudes and cause no damage on the continent. It is worth mentioning, though, that there are no aseismic regions in the world. Such an event could therefore happen again in the River Plate as evidenced by 26 June 1988 and 10 January 1990 earthquakes, the latter being the only one registered on Uruguayan mainland territory.

These earthquakes are believed to have originated in a particular region, the Punta del Este basin, which is highly faulted and where tectonic plates might experience certain movement thus causing the earthquake waves, according to Alberto Benavídez Sosa MGEOPHYS, agronomical engineer and former president of CERESIS (Seismology Regional Centre for South America) Earthquakes in the easternmost edge of the Pacific tectonic plates can occasionally be felt in the Argentine Atlantic coast, including Buenos Aires and only rarely on the Uruguayan coast.

== See also ==
- List of earthquakes in Argentina
- List of historical earthquakes
