= Las Heras, Mendoza =

Las Heras
- City
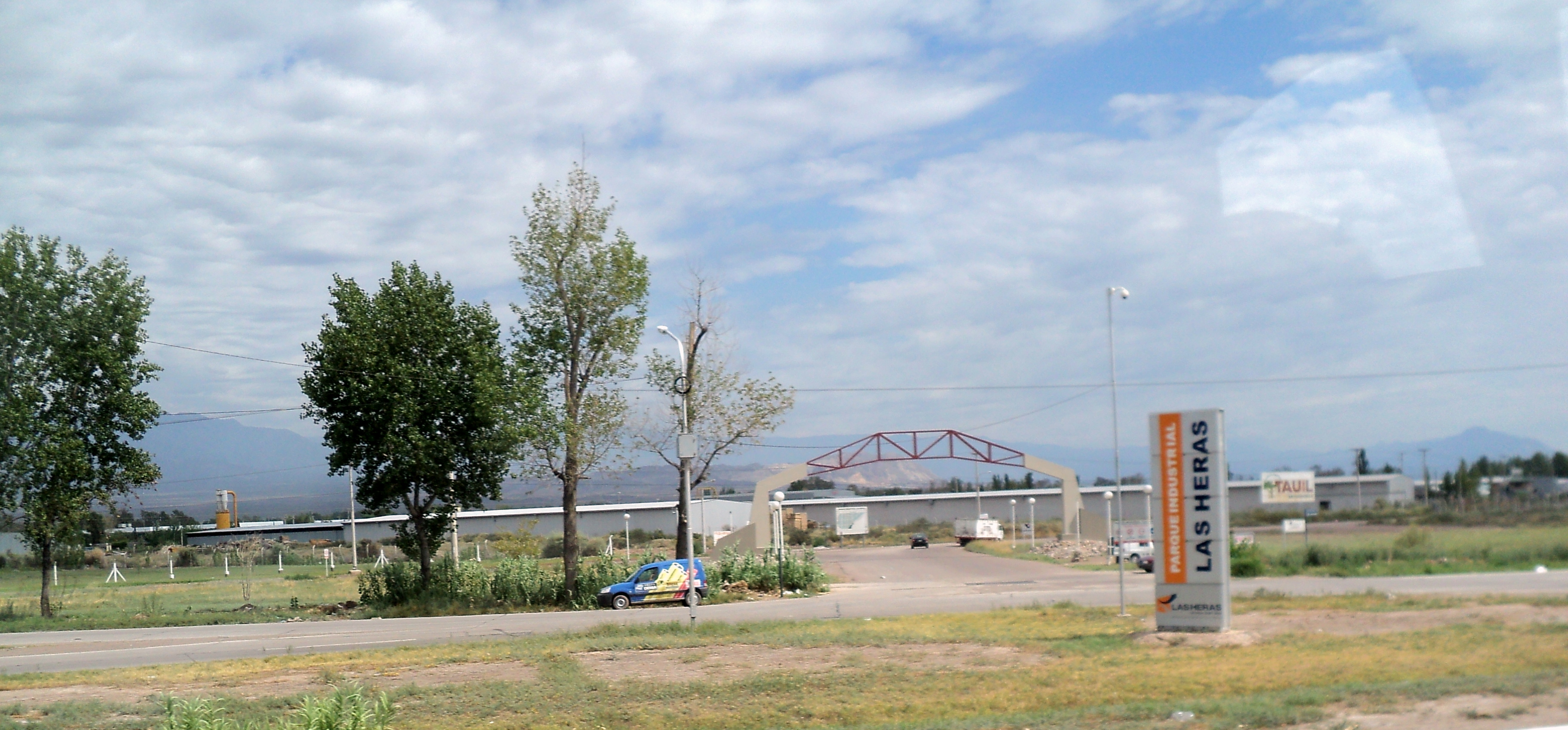

- Location of Las Heras in Argentina
- Coordinates: 32°51′S 68°49′W
- Country: Argentina
- Province: Mendoza
- Department: Las Heras
- Elevation: 725 m (2,379 ft)

Population (2010 census)
  - Urban: 189,067
  - Metro: 203,507
- Time zone: UTC−3 (ART)
- CPA base: M5540
- Dialing code: +54 261
- Climate: BWk
- Website: lasheras.gob.ar

Las Heras is a city in the province of Mendoza, Argentina, located in the north of the metropolitan area of the provincial capital (Greater Mendoza). It has more than 180,000 inhabitants as per the 2001 census [INDEC] and is the head town of the department of the same name.

Las Heras borders Mendoza City to the north, with San Martín Avenue serving as a major connecting road between the two. The area includes the low mountain range of El Challao, home to hot springs.

The name of the city is a homage to General Juan Gregorio de las Heras, hero of the Argentine War of Independence.

Las Heras was heavily damaged in the 1927 Mendoza earthquake.
