= 1952 Hasankale earthquake =

Earthquake in Erzurum Province, Turkey

- Location within Turkey
- UTC time: 1952-01-03 06:03:55
- ISC event: 892350
- USGS-ANSS: ComCat
- Local date: 3 January 1952
- Local time: 08:03:55
- Magnitude: 5.8 M_{s}
- Epicenter: 39.9°N 41.7°E
- Areas affected: Turkey
- Max. intensity: MMI VIII (Severe)
- Casualties: 41

The 1952 Hasankale earthquake occurred at 08:03 local time on 3 January in Hasankale (today Pasinler) in Erzurum Province, Eastern Anatolia region of Turkey. The earthquake had an estimated magnitude of 5.8 and a maximum felt intensity of VIII (Severe) on the Mercalli intensity scale, causing 41 casualties. This spot has been the subject of studies due to the amount of earthquakes that occur in Turkey. 17% of earthquakes, globally, occur in this area. This is because the Alpide belt crosses through Turkey. The earthquakes are cause when the plates try to slide past each other on a transform boundary.

== See also ==
- List of earthquakes in 1952
- List of earthquakes in Turkey
