= List of earthquakes in 1952 =

Earthquakes in 1952
Approximate epicenters of the earthquakes in 1952
- 4.0–5.9 magnitude
- 6.0–6.9 magnitude
- 7.0–7.9 magnitude
- 8.0+ magnitude
- Strongest: Soviet Union, off the east coast of Kamchatka (Magnitude 9.0) November 4
- Deadliest: Soviet Union off the east coast of Kamchatka (Magnitude 9.0) November 4 2.336 deaths
- Total fatalities: 2.558

Number by magnitude
- 9.0+: 1

This is a list of earthquakes in 1952. Only magnitude 6.0 or greater earthquakes appear on the list. Lower magnitude events are included if they have caused death, injury or damage. Events which occurred in remote areas will be excluded from the list as they wouldn't have generated significant media interest. All dates are listed according to UTC time. Two major earthquakes occurred in 1952; in March a magnitude 8.1 earthquake struck Japan resulting in a robust aftershock sequence. Then in November, a magnitude 9.0 earthquake rocked the Kamchatka area of Russia, causing a major tsunami. This event was the largest and deadliest of the year; it was also one of the largest of all time.

== Overall ==
=== By death toll ===
Rank	Death toll	Magnitude	Location	MMI	Depth (km)	Date
1	2,336	9.0	Soviet Union, off the east coast of Kamchatka	VII (Very strong)	21.6	November 4
2	103	5.7	Turkey, Erzurum Province	VIII (Severe)	20.0	January 3
3	54	7.4	China, eastern Xizang Province	X (Extreme)	25.0	August 17
4	33	8.1	Japan, off the south coast of Hokkaido	VIII (Severe)	45.0	March 4
5	20	5.7	Turkey, Adana Province	VII (Very strong)	15.0	October 22
6	12	7.5	United States, Central California	XI (Extreme)	6.0	July 21

- Note: At least 10 casualties

=== By magnitude ===
Rank	Magnitude	Death toll	Location	MMI	Depth (km)	Date
1	9.0	2,336	Soviet Union, off the east coast of Kamchatka	VII (Very strong)	21.6	November 4
2	8.1	33	Japan, off the south coast of Hokkaido	VIII (Severe)	45.0	March 4
3	7.5	12	United States, Central California	XI (Extreme)	6.0	July 21
4	7.4	54	China, eastern Xizang Province	X (Extreme)	25.0	August 17
5	7.3	0	Philippines, northeast of Mindanao	VII (Very strong)	15.0	March 19
= 6	7.1	0	Japan, off the southeast coast of Hokkaido	( )	15.0	March 4
= 6	7.1	0	Australia, southwest of Bougainville Island, Papua and New Guinea	( )	79.5	May 9
= 6	7.1	0	Argentina, Jujuy Province	( )	268.0	September 21
= 7	7.0	0	Indonesia, Wetar, Barat Daya Islands	VII (Very strong)	25.0	February 14
= 7	7.0	0	Japan, Kyoto Prefecture, Honshu	( )	369.0	May 28
= 7	7.0	0	Japan, Nara Prefecture, Honshu	( )	80.0	July 17
= 7	7.0	0	United Kingdom, Solomon Islands	VII (Very strong)	15.0	December 6

- Note: At least 7.0 magnitude

== Notable events ==
=== January ===
January
- Strongest: 6.8 M_{w} Mexico
- Deadliest: 5.7 M_{w} Turkey; 103 deaths
- Total fatalities: 103

Number by magnitude
- 8.0–8.9: 0
- 7.0–7.9: 0
- 6.0–6.9: 6
- 5.0–5.9: 1

Date	Country and location	M_{w}	Depth (km)	MMI	Notes	Casualties	
Date	Country and location	M_{w}	Depth (km)	MMI	Notes	Dead	Injured
3	Turkey, Erzurum Province	5.7	20.0	VIII	103 people were killed and some damage was caused by the 1952 Hasankale earthquake.	103	
13	Taiwan, southeast of	6.7	20.0				
15	Peru, Piura Region	6.3	35.0	VI			
23	China, Gansu Province	6.0	35.0	VI			
31	Fiji, south of	6.5	477.0				
31	Mexico, off the coast of Chiapas	6.8	82.5				
31	United Kingdom, Kigoma Region, Tanganyika	6.2	20.0	VII			

=== February ===
February
- Strongest: 7.0 M_{w} Indonesia
- Total fatalities: 0

Number by magnitude
- 8.0–8.9: 0
- 7.0–7.9: 1
- 6.0–6.9: 4

Date	Country and location	M_{w}	Depth (km)	MMI	Notes	Casualties	
Date	Country and location	M_{w}	Depth (km)	MMI	Notes	Dead	Injured
11	Indonesia, Java Sea	6.9	675.1				
14	Indonesia, Wetar, Barat Daya Islands	7.0	25.0	VII			
25	Tonga	6.5	41.8				
26	Peru, Puno Region	6.9	251.5				
26	Nicaragua, Rivas Department	6.0	88.1				

=== March ===
March
- Strongest: 8.1 M_{w} Japan
- Deadliest: 8.1 M_{w} Japan; 33 deaths
- Total fatalities: 33

Number by magnitude
- 8.0–8.9: 1
- 7.0–7.9: 2
- 6.0–6.9: 17

Date	Country and location	M_{w}	Depth (km)	MMI	Notes	Casualties	
Date	Country and location	M_{w}	Depth (km)	MMI	Notes	Dead	Injured
2	Nicaragua, off the southwest coast	6.1	46.9	V			
4	Japan, off the south coast of Hokkaido	8.1	45.0	VIII	The 1952 Hokkaido earthquake caused major destruction mainly due to a tsunami affecting the area. 33 people were killed and 572 were injured. 2,422 homes were destroyed.	33	572
4	Japan, off the southeast coast of Hokkaido	7.1	15.0		Aftershock.		
4	Japan, off the southeast coast of Hokkaido	6.3	12.4		Aftershock.		
4	United Kingdom, Solomon Islands	6.2	15.0	VI			
4	Japan, off the southeast coast of Hokkaido	6.7	15.0		Aftershock.		
5	Japan, off the southeast coast of Hokkaido	6.4	16.0		Aftershock.		
5	Japan, off the southeast coast of Hokkaido	6.3	25.0		Aftershock.		
5	Mexico, southern Gulf of California	6.4	10.0	V			
7	Japan, off the coast of Ishikawa Prefecture, Honshu	6.5	10.0	VI			
7	Japan, off the southeast coast of Hokkaido	6.0	30.0		Aftershock.		
9	Japan, off the south coast of Hokkaido	6.9	49.5	VI	Aftershock. 17 people were hurt and 113 homes collapsed.		17
9	United States, Southeastern Alaska	6.1	10.0				
13	Japan, Ryukyu Islands	6.5	280.8				
14	Japan, off the southeast coast of Hokkaido	6.1	40.9	V	Aftershock.		
15	Indonesia, southern Sumatra	6.3	15.0	VII			
19	North Korea, Pyongyang	6.3	35.0	VI			
19	Philippines, northeast of Mindanao	7.3	15.0	VII	Some damage was caused.		
23	Indonesia, Talaud Islands	6.2	25.0				
25	Australia, East New Britain Province, Papua and New Guinea	6.0	35.0	V			

=== April ===
April
- Strongest: 6.5 M_{w} 2 events
- Total fatalities: 0

Number by magnitude
- 8.0–8.9: 0
- 7.0–7.9: 0
- 6.0–6.9: 8

Date	Country and location	M_{w}	Depth (km)	MMI	Notes	Casualties	
Date	Country and location	M_{w}	Depth (km)	MMI	Notes	Dead	Injured
8	Philippines, off the northwest coast of Mindanao	6.3	35.0	V			
10	Japan, Ryukyu Islands	6.3	15.0				
14	Indonesia, Talaud Islands	6.2	70.0				
15	Japan, off the south coast of Hokkaido	6.0	57.2	V	Aftershock of March 4 event.		
15	Fiji	6.5	395.0				
19	Venezuela, Colombia	6.5	28.2	VI			
28	Japan, off the south coast of Hokkaido	6.2	65.0	VI	Aftershock.		
29	Chile, O'Higgins Region	6.0	50.0				

=== May ===
May
- Strongest: 7.1 M_{w} Australia
- Total fatalities: 0

Number by magnitude
- 8.0–8.9: 0
- 7.0–7.9: 2
- 6.0–6.9: 14

Date	Country and location	M_{w}	Depth (km)	MMI	Notes	Casualties	
Date	Country and location	M_{w}	Depth (km)	MMI	Notes	Dead	Injured
4	Fiji, south of	6.5	75.0				
8	Japan, Chiba Prefecture, Honshu	6.0	48.9	V			
8	Indonesia, Molucca Sea	6.6	101.4				
9	New Zealand, Kermadec Islands	6.8	390.0				
9	Australia, southwest of Bougainville Island, Papua and New Guinea	7.1	79.5				
13	Costa Rica, Guanacaste Province	6.4	35.0	VI			
14	Japan, off the southeast coast of Hokkaido	6.2	30.0		Aftershock of March 4 event.		
16	Panama, off the south coast	6.3	10.0				
17	Japan, off the southeast coast of Hokkaido	6.4	39.3		Aftershock of March 4 event.		
19	Japan, off the southeast coast of Hokkaido	6.5	30.0	IV	Aftershock of March 4 event.		
22	Japan, southeast of the Ryukyu Islands	6.2	30.2	IV			
23	United States, off the west coast of Hawaii (island), Hawaii	6.0	10.0	VI			
24	Chile, off the coast of Tarapaca Region	6.0	25.0				
24	Indonesia, Batu Islands	6.6	30.0	VI			
26	India, Arunachal Pradesh	6.0	20.0	VII			
28	Japan, Kyoto Prefecture, Honshu	7.0	369.0				

=== June ===
June
- Strongest: 6.8 M_{w} Russian Soviet Federative Socialist Republic
- Total fatalities: 0

Number by magnitude
- 8.0–8.9: 0
- 7.0–7.9: 0
- 6.0–6.9: 11

Date	Country and location	M_{w}	Depth (km)	MMI	Notes	Casualties	
Date	Country and location	M_{w}	Depth (km)	MMI	Notes	Dead	Injured
4	Colombia, off the west coast	6.1	10.0				
10	Fiji	6.5	25.0				
11	Argentina, San Juan Province, Argentina	6.5	25.0	VI	1952 San Juan earthquake.		
17	Indonesia, Banda Sea	6.1	25.0	VI			
19	China, Yunnan Province	6.7	10.0	VIII	10 homes were destroyed.		
19	Samoa	6.6	15.0				
20	Taiwan, off the east coast	6.5	100.0				
22	Russian Soviet Federative Socialist Republic, Kuril Islands	6.8	27.0				
23	Taiwan, off the east coast	6.2	38.1	V			
25	China, western Sichuan Province	6.1	10.0	VII			
30	United Kingdom, Western Region, Uganda	6.5	15.0	VIII			

=== July ===
July
- Strongest: 7.5 M_{w} United States
- Deadliest: 7.5 M_{w} United States; 12 deaths
- Total fatalities: 12

Number by magnitude
- 8.0–8.9: 0
- 7.0–7.9: 2
- 6.0–6.9: 8

Date	Country and location	M_{w}	Depth (km)	MMI	Notes	Casualties	
Date	Country and location	M_{w}	Depth (km)	MMI	Notes	Dead	Injured
5	Chile, Coquimbo Region	6.1	35.0	VI			
10	Fiji	6.5	685.6				
13	France, southeast of the Loyalty Islands, New Caledonia	6.5	0.0		Unknown depth.		
13	New Hebrides Vanuatu	6.8	280.0				
13	Indonesia, east of Buru	6.5	25.0	VI			
17	Japan Nara Prefecture, Honshu	7.0	80.0				
21	United States, central California	7.5	6.0	XI	The 1952 Kern County earthquake was the largest quake to strike the conterminous states in nearly 50 years. Many aftershocks followed including some damaging ones. 12 people were killed and at least 101 were injured. Damage costs reached $60 million (1952 rate).	12	101+
24	New Zealand, Kermadec Islands	6.6	100.0				
24	Japan, off the southeast coast of Hokkaido	6.2	35.0	V	Aftershock of March 4 event.		
27	Fiji	6.9	502.2				

=== August ===
August
- Strongest: 7.4 M_{w} China
- Deadliest: 7.4 M_{w} China; 54 deaths
- Total fatalities: 56

Number by magnitude
- 8.0–8.9: 0
- 7.0–7.9: 1
- 6.0–6.9: 5
- 5.0–5.9: 1

Date	Country and location	M_{w}	Depth (km)	MMI	Notes	Casualties	
Date	Country and location	M_{w}	Depth (km)	MMI	Notes	Dead	Injured
14	Australia, southwest of Bougainville Island, Papua and New Guinea	6.2	48.3	V			
15	Fiji	6.5	603.0				
16	Australia, southwest of Bougainville Island, Papua and New Guinea	6.2	35.0	V			
17	China, eastern Xizang Province	7.4	25.0	X	The 1952 Damxung earthquake left 54 people dead. 774 homes were destroyed.	54	
18	Chile, off the coast of Coquimbo Region	6.2	35.0	VI			
22	United States, central California	5.5	6.0	VIII	Aftershock of 1952 Kern County earthquake. 2 people were killed and at least 51 were injured. 90 homes were destroyed and damage costs were $10 million (1952 rate).	2	51+
31	Japan, off the south coast of Hokkaido	6.1	63.9	V	Aftershock of March event.		

=== September ===
September
- Strongest: 7.1 M_{w} Argentina
- Total fatalities: 0

Number by magnitude
- 8.0–8.9: 0
- 7.0–7.9: 1
- 6.0–6.9: 6

Date	Country and location	M_{w}	Depth (km)	MMI	Notes	Casualties	
Date	Country and location	M_{w}	Depth (km)	MMI	Notes	Dead	Injured
9	Costa Rica, off the west coast	6.7	15.0	VI			
14	China, southern Qinghai Province	6.0	15.0	VII			
19	Australia, southwest of Bougainville Island, Papua and New Guinea	6.1	64.0				
21	Argentina, Jujuy Province	7.1	268.0				
22	United States, northern California	6.0	15.0	VII			
27	Russian Soviet Federative Socialist Republic, northern Kuril Islands	6.2	60.0	V			
30	China, Sichuan Province	6.6	10.0	IX	4,196 homes were destroyed.		

=== October ===
October
- Strongest: 6.6 M_{w} Japan
- Deadliest: 5.7 M_{w} Turkey; 20 deaths
- Total fatalities: 20

Number by magnitude
- 8.0–8.9: 0
- 7.0–7.9: 0
- 6.0–6.9: 14
- 5.0–5.9: 2

Date	Country and location	M_{w}	Depth (km)	MMI	Notes	Casualties	
Date	Country and location	M_{w}	Depth (km)	MMI	Notes	Dead	Injured
5	China, northern Qinghai Province	6.1	15.0	VII			
8	China, Shanxi Province	5.8	15.0	VIII	5,043 homes were destroyed.		
10	Pakistan, Baluchistan, Pakistan	6.4	35.0	VI			
11	Australia, north of New Britain, Papua and New Guinea	6.3	75.0	V			
18	New Hebrides, Vanuatu	6.3	35.0	V			
22	Turkey, Adana Province	5.7	15.0	VII	20 people were killed and major damage was caused.	20	
26	Japan, off the east coast of Honshu	6.6	27.8		Series of earthquakes off the east coast of Honshu began with this event.		
26	Japan, off the east coast of Honshu	6.5	27.7				
26	Japan, off the east coast of Honshu	6.5	25.0				
26	Japan, off the east coast of Honshu	6.3	24.2				
27	Japan, off the east coast of Honshu	6.5	22.5				
28	Haiti, Grand'Anse (department)	6.2	25.0	VII			
28	Japan, off the east coast of Honshu	6.3	15.0				
29	Tonga	6.5	135.0				
31	Japan, off the east coast of Honshu	6.5	20.0				
31	China, Sichuan Province	6.2	15.0	VII			

=== November ===
November
- Strongest: 9.0 M_{w} Soviet Union
- Deadliest: 9.0 M_{w} Soviet Union; 2,336 deaths
- Total fatalities: 2,336

Number by magnitude
- 9.0+: 1
- 8.0–8.9: 0
- 7.0–7.9: 0
- 6.0–6.9: 18

Date	Country and location	M_{w}	Depth (km)	MMI	Notes	Casualties	
Date	Country and location	M_{w}	Depth (km)	MMI	Notes	Dead	Injured
1	Fiji	6.9	170.7				
4	Soviet Union, off the east coast of Kamchatka	9.0	21.6	VII	One of the largest earthquakes of all time. The 1952 Severo-Kurilsk earthquake triggered a major tsunami. Information on the disaster was sparse due to secrecy by the Soviet Union government. According to the government, out of 6,000 people, 2,336 people died. Major damage was caused in the area. Hawaii saw some damage from the waves. Many aftershocks followed but to prevent cluttering only magnitude 6.5 or greater ones are included.		2,336
6	Australia, Madang Province, Papua and New Guinea	6.8	52.1	VI			
7	Mexico, Gulf of California	6.3	15.0	VI			
16	Australia, West New Britain Province, Papua and New Guinea	6.1	35.0	VI			
20	Nicaragua, off the west coast	6.3	35.0	IV			
22	United States, central California	6.2	6.0	VII			
28	Australia, southeast of Bougainville Island, Papua and New Guinea	6.8	107.1				
29	United States, south of Kodiak Island, Alaska	6.8	20.0				

=== December ===
December
- Strongest: 7.0 M_{w} United Kingdom
- Total fatalities: 0

Number by magnitude
- 8.0–8.9: 0
- 7.0–7.9: 1
- 6.0–6.9: 15

Date	Country and location	M_{w}	Depth (km)	MMI	Notes	Casualties	
Date	Country and location	M_{w}	Depth (km)	MMI	Notes	Dead	Injured
6	United Kingdom, Solomon Islands	7.0	15.0	VII			
7	United States, Near Islands, Alaska	6.5	35.0	VI			
8	China, Yunnan Province	6.2	15.0	VIII	60 homes were destroyed.		
17	Greece, south of Crete	6.5	25.0	V			
24	Australia, East New Britain Province, Papua and New Guinea	6.1	45.0	V	Foreshock.		
24	Australia, East New Britain Province, Papua and New Guinea	6.8	21.2	VII			
24	Australia, East New Britain Province, Papua and New Guinea	6.4	35.0	VI	Aftershock.		
25	Australia, East New Britain Province, Papua New Guinea	6.2	35.0	VI	Aftershock.		
25	Australia, East New Britain Province, Papua and New Guinea	6.2	45.0	V	Aftershock.		
25	Australia, East New Britain Province, Papua and New Guinea	6.2	30.0		Aftershock.		
25	Pakistan, Punjab, Pakistan	6.2	10.0	VII			
27	New Hebrides, east of Vanuatu	6.5	33.0				
28	Philippines, southeast of Mindanao	6.5	35.0				
29	Fiji	6.5	481.3				
31	Greece, north of Crete	6.0	0.0	rowspan="2"| Doublet earthquake. Unknown depth.			
31	Greece, north of Crete	6.0	0.0				

=== Kamchatka aftershock table ===
Date (YYYY-MM-DD)	Time (UTC)	Location	Depth	Magnitude
1952-11-04	20:48:52	northern Kuril Islands	30.0 km (19 mi)	6.9
1952-11-04	22:13:04	off east coast of Kamchatka	22.7 km (14 mi)	6.5
1952-11-04	22:19:28	off east coast of Kamchatka	20.0 km (12 mi)	6.7
1952-11-05	05:57:53	northern Kuril Islands	32.8 km (20 mi)	6.5
1952-11-05	13:06:31	off the east coast of Kamchatka	25.0 km (16 mi)	6.5
1952-11-06	19:46:06	off the east coast of Kamchatka	30.0 km (19 mi)	6.6
1952-11-07	14:08:36	northern Kuril Islands	54.1 km (34 mi)	6.5
1952-11-08	19:33:25	east of Kuril Islands	20.0 km (12 mi)	6.5
1952-11-13	07:58:54	northern Kuril Islands	45.0 km (28 mi)	6.5
1952-11-29	08:22:43	off the east coast of Kamchatka	23.7 km (15 mi)	6.7
