= 1692 Salta earthquake =

Earthquake in Argentina

- Location within Argentina
- Local date: 13 September 1692
- Local time: 11:00
- Magnitude: 7.0 M_{L}
- Depth: 30 kilometers (19 mi)
- Epicenter: 25.40°S 64.80°W
- Areas affected: Argentina (Salta)
- Max. intensity: MMI IX (Violent)
- Casualties: ~13

The 1692 Salta earthquake took place in the Province of Salta, in the Republic of Argentina on 13 September at 11:00 a.m. local time. It registered 7.0 on the Richter scale and was located at a depth of 30 kilometres (19 mi). Aftershocks continued to be felt until 15 September. The fault responsible for the earthquake has not been identified, although it may have been the Mojotoro fault.

== Damage and casualties ==
The destructive force of the 1692 Salta earthquake was measured at IX on the Mercalli intensity scale. It completely destroyed the small village of Talavera del Esteco, in the province of Salta. It caused 13 deaths and injuries as well as significant damage to the city of Salta.

== Aftermath ==
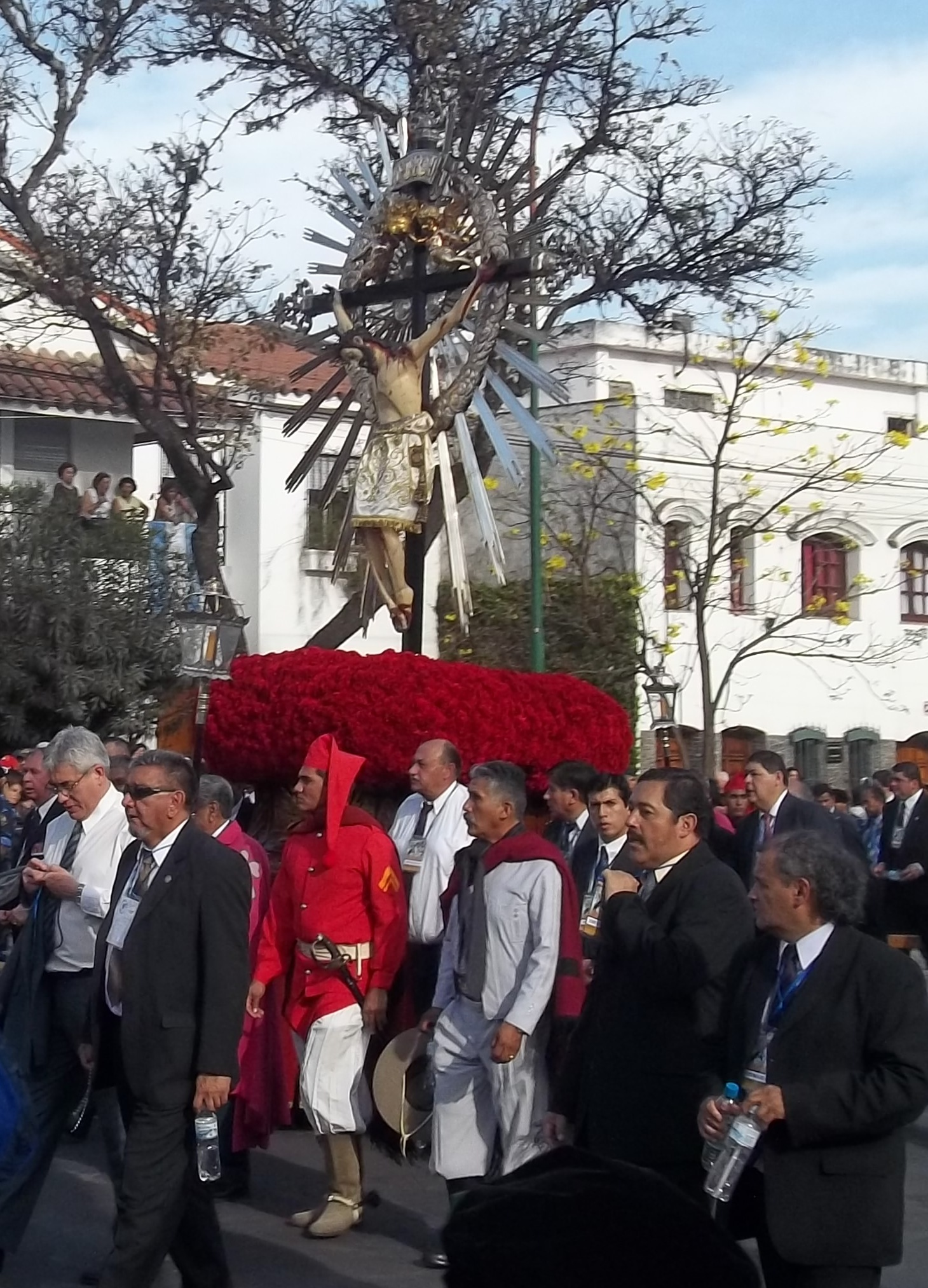
Statue of the Señor del Milagro

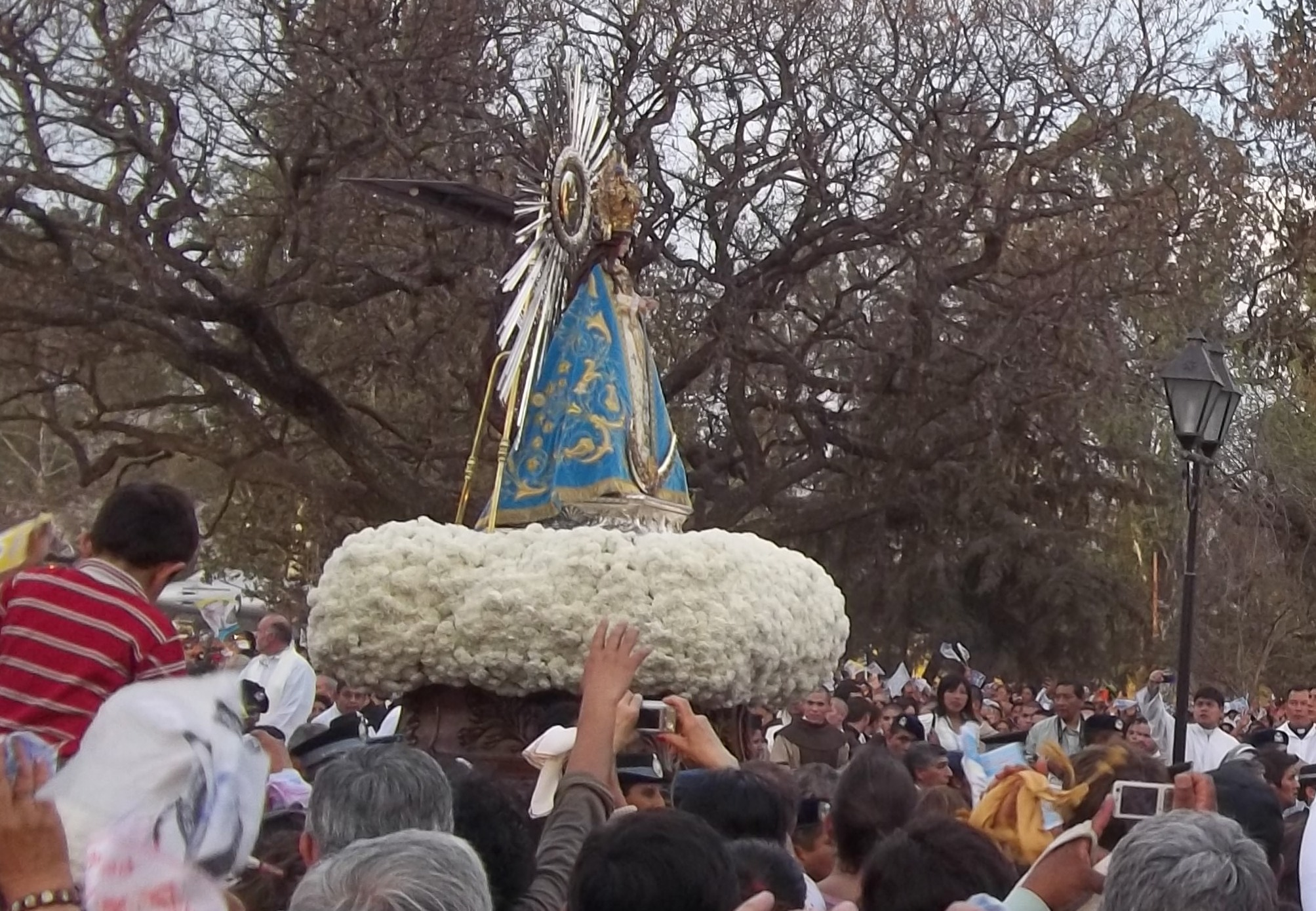
Statue of the Virgen del Milagro

Salteño tradition has it that the number of victims was not higher because the earthquake occurred during the day and that the villagers were able to take measures to prevent greater damage. It is recounted that, in the middle of the chaos of the earthquake, while the houses were shaking and roofs were falling off, that the image of the Immaculate Conception (then called the Virgen del Milagro), then located in the Catedral de Salta, fell some three meters to the ground. Villagers, who had run to the church to pray, saw that the image was not only undamaged from the fall, but that it had fallen at the feet of the image of Christ. The villages interpreted that the image was interceding to Christ on behalf of the village. The following day the villagers paraded the image through the streets. The Salteños began venerating the image and praying for it to stop the earthquake. The tremors continued for two more days.

On 8 October 1692 the Salta town council labelled the events of 13–15 September as miraculous. Nuestra Señora del Milagro was appointed "advocate" of the city and 13 September declared a national holiday. On 15 October she was recognized as Patroness and Advocate of Salta. The miraculous events of 13–15 September 1692 was the commencement of what has become the yearly Fiesta del milagro (Feast of the miracle) on 15 September each year. The celebrations commence with festivities as early as 6 September and continue until the 15th when the images of Christ and the Virgen del Milagro, are paraded through the streets in a grand procession. The Fiesta del Milagro is the most popular religious festival in Salta and one of the most important in Argentina.

== Esteco ==
CONICET archaeologists and other investigators undertook excavations at the site where the city of Esteco II (officially called Nuestra Señora de Talavera de Madrid) was destroyed by the 1692 earthquake. The excavations were done within a 27 square metres (290 sq ft) area. They found a wall and one of the four towers of the fort that protected the city, located in Río Piedras, in the department of Metán.

== See also ==
- List of earthquakes in Argentina
- List of historical earthquakes
