= 1871 Orán earthquake =

Earthquake in Argentina

- Location within Argentina
- Local date: 9 October 1871
- Local time: 02:15
- Magnitude: 6.4 M_{s}
- Depth: 30 km (19 mi)
- Epicenter: 25.60°S 64.1759°W
- Areas affected: Salta, Argentina
- Max. intensity: MMI VIII (Severe)
- Casualties: 20

The 1871 Orán earthquake that took place in the Province of Salta, in the Republic of Argentina, on Tuesday, 9 October 1871 at 02:15. It had an estimated magnitude of 6.4 M_{s}. The earthquake was located at a depth of 30 kilometres (19 mi).

== Damage and casualties ==
The destructive force of the 1871 Orán earthquake was measured at VIII on the Mercalli intensity scale. It completely destroyed the former city of Orán (now San Ramón de la Nueva Orán), towards the northern parts of the province of Salta. It caused 20 deaths as well as injuries.

== Aftermath ==
As a result of the destruction of the original city of Orán, it was later reestablished under the name of San Ramón de la Nueva Orán.

== See also ==
- List of earthquakes in Argentina
- List of historical earthquakes
