= 2006 Mendoza earthquake =

Earthquake in Argentina

- Location within Argentina
- UTC time: 2006-08-05 14:03:44
- ISC event: 8568187
- USGS-ANSS: ComCat
- Local date: August 5, 2006
- Local time: 11:03:44 ART
- Magnitude: 5.6 M_{w}
- Depth: 25.0 kilometers (15.5 mi)
- Epicenter: 33.126°S 68.719°W
- Areas affected: Mendoza, Argentina
- Max. intensity: MMI VI (Strong)
- Casualties: Several injured

The 2006 Mendoza earthquake was a medium-intensity seismic movement in the province of Mendoza, Argentina. It took place at 11:03 AM (UTC-3) on 5 August 2006, and had a magnitude of 5.6 in the Richter scale. Its hypocenter was centered 23 km west southwest of San Martin, exactly at the town of Ugarteche, Luján de Cuyo, and at a depth of 25 km.

The earthquake was felt in the provinces of Mendoza (V–VI in the Mercalli intensity scale), San Juan, San Luis (IV Mercalli), La Rioja, and Córdoba (III Mercalli). It damaged about 600 buildings in the Greater Mendoza metropolitan area (mostly either precarious or old), as well as causing brief interruptions in the supply of electric power and mobile phone communications. Only a few wounded people were reported; there were no fatalities.

On the following day a new, a minor earthquake (magnitude 3.7) was recorded about 5 km from the previous location, at a depth of 90 km. It was felt as grade II–III in the Mercalli scale in the city of Mendoza.

The area is the most seismically active in Argentina. This seismic event was the largest in 20 years; the 1985 Mendoza earthquake (magnitude 6.0) caused 6 casualties and damaged thousands of houses and was centered at Godoy Cruz, just 4 km south of Mendoza.

== See also ==
- List of earthquakes in 2006
- List of earthquakes in Argentina
