= 2010 Salta earthquake =

Earthquake in Argentina

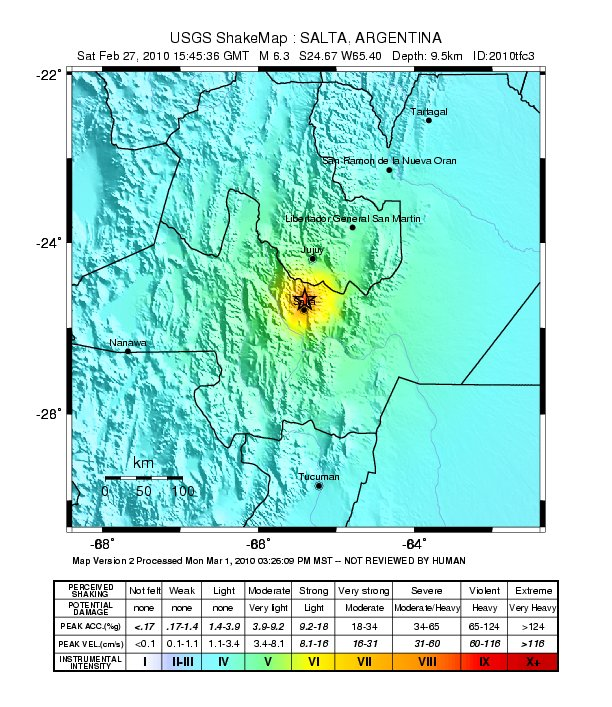

- Location within Argentina
- UTC time: 2010-02-27 15:45:36
- ISC event: 14341924
- USGS-ANSS: ComCat
- Local date: February 27, 2010
- Local time: 12:45:36 ART
- Magnitude: 6.3 M_{w}
- Depth: 15.3 kilometers (9.5 mi)
- Epicenter: 24.674°S 65.043°W
- Areas affected: Salta, Argentina
- Max. intensity: MMI VIII (Severe)
- Aftershocks: ~24
- Casualties: 2 dead, "dozens" injured

The 2010 Salta earthquake occurred on February 27 at 12:45:36 local time in Salta Province, Argentina and had a magnitude of 6.3. It occurred less than 12 hours after the far larger magnitude 8.8 Chile earthquake, which killed 525 people. It was initially thought to be an aftershock of the Chile earthquake, but scientists later established that the earthquakes were unrelated. The epicenter was about 24 kilometers (15 mi) north of the city of Salta. The quake killed two people, and injured dozens.

== Damage and casualties ==
The damage was not great, but small buildings and slums were easily destroyed. The earthquake received little regional coverage, largely because the catastrophe in Chile, occurring a few hours earlier, garnered the most attention. Much of the destruction happened in the towns of Campo Quijano and La Merced, where several adobe houses collapsed and numerous others were left uninhabitable.

There were two deaths, including an 8-year-old boy.

== See also ==
- List of earthquakes in 2010
- List of earthquakes in Argentina
