= Nuestra Señora de Talavera =

Coordinates: 25°26′S 63°48′W

- Municipality and town
- Interactive map of Nuestra Señora de Talavera
- Country: Argentina
- Province: Salta Province
- Time zone: UTC−3 (ART)

Nuestra Señora de Talavera is a town and municipality in Salta Province in northwestern Argentina.
