= 1952 Tokachi earthquake =

Earthquake in Hokkaidō, Japan

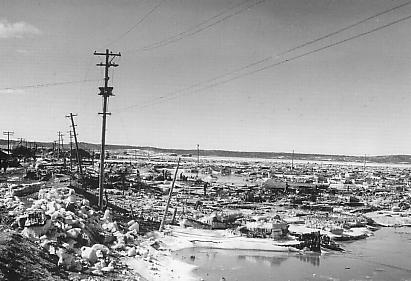

- Location within Hokkaido
- UTC time: 1952-03-04 01:22:41
- ISC event: 892540
- USGS-ANSS: ComCat
- Local date: March 4, 1952
- Local time: 10:22:41
- Magnitude: 8.1 M_{w}
- Depth: 45 km
- Epicenter: 41.8°N 144.13°E
- Areas affected: Japan
- Tsunami: Yes
- Casualties: 33 dead, 287 injured

The 1952 Tokachi earthquake (Japanese: 1952年十勝沖地震), occurred at 10:22:41 local time on 4 March in the sea near Tokachi District, Hokkaidō, Japan. It had a magnitude of 8.1 on the moment magnitude scale.

== Damage ==
There was earthquake and tsunami damage in an area ranging from Hokkaido to the northern part of the Tohoku region. As a result, 28 people were killed, five were missing, and 287 were injured. In addition, 815 houses were completely destroyed, 1324 half-damaged, and 6395 partially damaged. Ninety-one houses were swept away, 328 suffered flooding, 20 were lost to fire, and 1621 became uninhabitable. Furthermore, 451 ships were damaged.

In Hamanaka, in the Akkeshi District, Hokkaidō, a tsunami destroyed numerous homes. It is thought that drift ice was pushed up by the tsunami and exacerbated the damage. Eight years later, this area was devastated by the tsunami caused by the 1960 Chile earthquake, killing 11 people.

Akkeshi Bay saw the highest tsunami surge, of 6.5 metres (21 ft), with Hachinohe in Aomori also seeing a 2-metre (6 ft 7 in) wave. This was the first large tsunami after the inception of Japan's tsunami warning system. The previous day, March 3, was the anniversary of the 1933 Sanriku earthquake, and the large number of training and evacuation drills held that day bolstered the response to the real disaster on March 4.

== See also ==
- List of earthquakes in 1952
- List of earthquakes in Japan
