= 1861 Mendoza earthquake =

Violent earthquake in Argentina

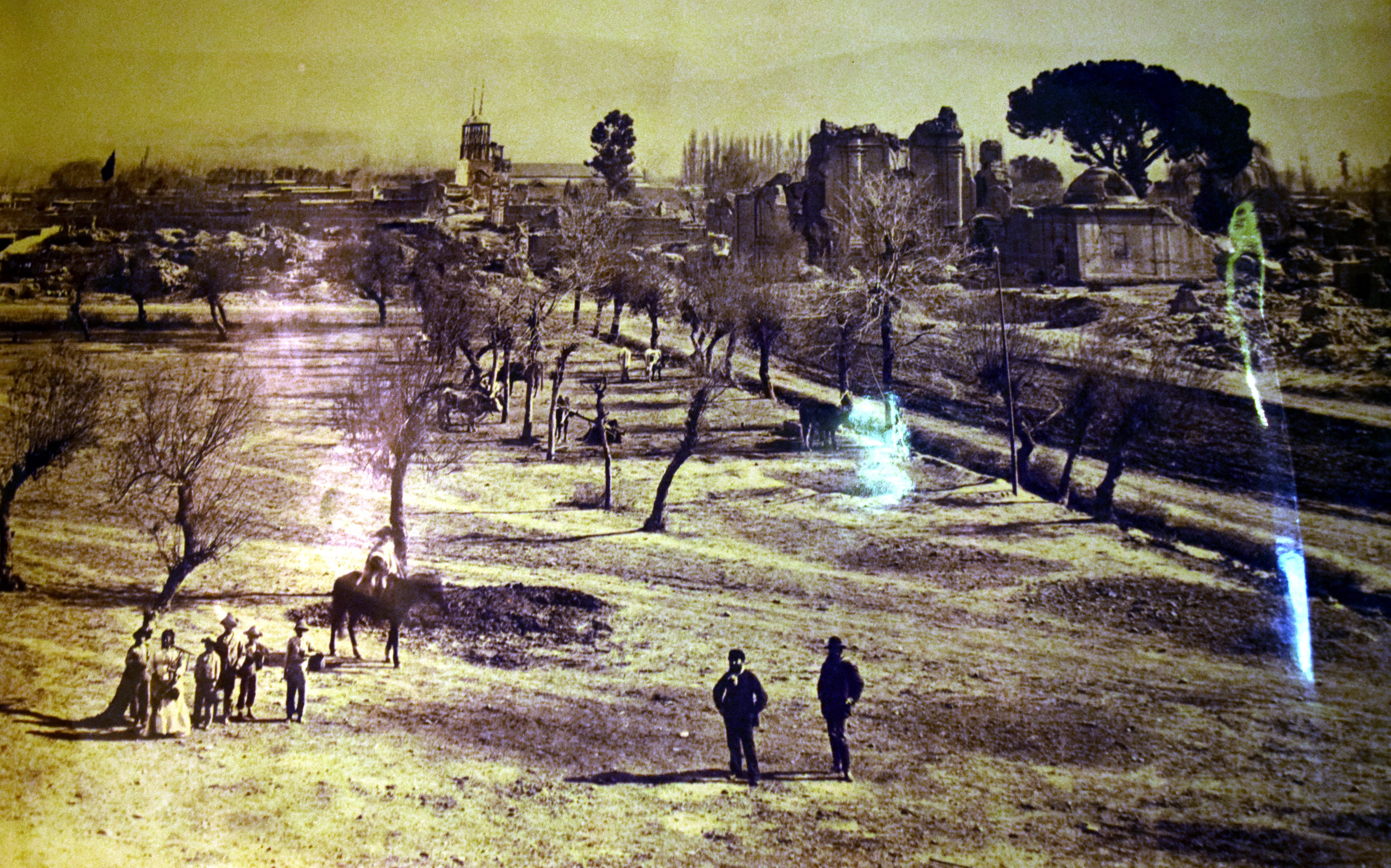
- Ruins in the Plaza Pedro del Castillo in the city of Mendoza after the 1861 earthquake.

- Location within Argentina
- UTC time: 1861-03-21
- Local date: March 20, 1861
- Local time: 11:30 PM
- Magnitude: 7.2 M_{s}
- Depth: 30 km (19 mi)
- Epicenter: 32.54°S 68.54°W
- Fault: Cal Fault
- Type: Thrust fault
- Areas affected: Argentina, Mendoza Province
- Max. intensity: MMI IX (Violent)
- Landslides: yes
- Casualties: 6,000–12,000

The 1861 Mendoza earthquake occurred in the province of Mendoza, Argentina on 20 March at 11:30 PM. It had an estimated magnitude of 7.2 on the M_{s} scale and an intensity of IX–X on the Mercalli scale. Its hypocenter was located at an estimated depth of 30 kilometres (19 mi).

== Tectonic setting ==
The city of Mendoza lies just to the east of the Precordillera structural belt, at the eastern margin of the Andes mountain belt. The ongoing Pampean flat-slab subduction of the Nazca plate below the South American plate is causing shortening in the over-riding plate that is concentrated in the Precordillera belt, with a rate of 4.5±1.7 mm per year, from GPS data. This shortening is expressed as active thrust faulting. The two active thrust faults near Mendoza are the Peñas Thrust and the Cal Thrust, with the latter reaching the surface inside the city. This zone is one of the most seismically active parts of the Andes.

== Earthquake ==
The earthquake is thought to have been caused by rupture of the Cal Thrust. The estimated magnitude of 7.2 M_{s} is consistent with the estimated slip rate and frequency of ruptures along this fault, which suggest vertical offsets in the range 0.8–1.0 m for the last three to four earthquakes.

== Damage ==
The earthquake devastated the provincial capital, Mendoza. It is believed to have killed somewhere in the range of 6,000 to 12,000 people—although even higher numbers have been suggested—and injured thousands more. Most of the buildings were destroyed, including the cabildo (colonial government house). Fires caused by rupturing of the gas supply for lighting in some stores lasted for four days. The obstruction of canals led to local flooding. The effects of liquefaction were widely reported and many large landslides were observed.

The town was rebuilt in a nearby location, and the authorities moved to their new seat in 1863. The new constructions, which incorporated modern architectural styles, were markedly different from the old colonial buildings.

== Notable deaths ==
- Auguste Bravard

== See also ==
- List of earthquakes in Argentina
- List of historical earthquakes

== Bibliography ==
- (in Spanish) Epicentro de los terremotos destructivos en Argentina (1692–2012) Listado de Terremotos Históricos.
