= Ludwig Grillich =

Austrian photographer (1855–1926)

Ludwig Grillich (1855 – 21 May 1926) was an Austrian professional portrait photographer during the heyday of the Vienna pre-War period of the nineteenth century and had studios there and in Franzensbad. Some notables who appeared before his lens were Anton Bruckner, Johann Strauss II, Johannes Brahms and Sigmund Freud. He was also responsible for a series of postcards depicting famous buildings in Vienna.
