= 1782 Mendoza earthquake =

- Location within Argentina
- Local date: 22 May 1782
- Local time: 16:00
- Magnitude: M_{L} 7.0
- Depth: 30 km (19 mi)
- Epicenter: 33.0°S 69.12°W
- Areas affected: Salta, Argentina
- Max. intensity: MMI VIII (Severe)
- Casualties: None

The 1782 Mendoza earthquake took place in the province of Mendoza, Argentina, on 22 May 1782, at about 4 p.m. (UTC-3). It had an estimated magnitude of 7.0 on the Richter scale. Its epicenter was at 33°0′S 69°12′W, at a depth of 30 km.

This was the first documented earthquake of the many that would affect the provincial capital of Mendoza since its foundation. It was felt with grade VIII (Severe) on the Mercalli intensity scale, and damaged several buildings, but did not produce casualties.

== See also ==
- 1920 Mendoza earthquake
