= 1920 Mendoza earthquake =

- Location within Argentina
- UTC time: 1920-12-17 19:00:04
- ISC event: 912690
- USGS-ANSS: ComCat
- Local date: December 17, 1920
- Local time: 15:00:04
- Magnitude: 6.0 M_{w}
- Depth: 40 km (25 mi)
- Epicenter: 32.41°S 68.24°W
- Areas affected: Mendoza, Argentina
- Max. intensity: MMI VIII (Severe)
- Casualties: 200 dead

The 1920 Mendoza earthquake took place in the province of Mendoza, Argentina, on 17 December at 15:00:04 local time;. It measured magnitude 6.0, and its epicenter was at 32°42′S 68°24′W, with a depth of 40 km.

The earthquake was felt with grade VIII (Severe) on the Mercalli intensity scale. It affected the provincial capital Mendoza, and caused material damage and numerous fatalities in several towns 30 km (19 mi) to the northeast.

== See also ==
- 1782 Mendoza earthquake
- List of earthquakes in 1920
- List of earthquakes in Argentina
- List of historical earthquakes
