= 1927 Mendoza earthquake =

- Location within Argentina
- UTC time: 1927-04-14 06:23:28
- ISC event: 909200
- USGS-ANSS: ComCat
- Local date: 14 April 1927
- Local time: 03:23
- Magnitude: M_{L} 7.1
- Depth: 110 km (68 mi)
- Epicenter: 32.0°S 69.5°W
- Areas affected: Salta, Argentina
- Max. intensity: MMI VIII (Severe)
- Casualties: 3

The 1927 Mendoza earthquake took place in Mendoza Province, in the Republic of Argentina, on 14 April at 06:23:28 UTC. It registered a magnitude of 7.1 on the Richter magnitude scale. The earthquake was located at a depth of 110 kilometres (68 mi).

== Location ==
The epicenter was located in a zone of instability towards the north of Aconcagua, in the Andes mountain range, 1,100 kilometres (680 mi) from La Plata. From there the seismic waves spread on one side from west to east, destroying the Andean city, and on the other side towards the west where it reached the Chilean Longitudinal Valley and continued along its length to Santiago. The epicenter was farther west than common for seismic movements in Mendoza.

== Damage and casualties ==
The destructive force of the 1927 Mendoza earthquake was measured at VIII on the Mercalli intensity scale. It caused 3 deaths and several injuries. Localities in both Argentina and Chile were affected by the earthquake, including the cities of Mendoza and Santiago. The earthquake was felt as far as the provinces of San Juan, La Rioja, Córdoba and Buenos Aires.

Most of the damage in Argentina was concentrated in the Mendozan city of Las Heras. Here buildings and walls collapsed and fissures were formed in the land. The community of Resbalón in the city of Las Heras. Multiple cracks in the earth were noticed in the community of Resguardo and wells were surging water. In the city of Mendoza the earthquake destroyed the government building as well as several schools. Several buildings were damaged in San Juan.

Following the tremors ground water emitted from previously dry areas, forming marshes and affecting the flow of traffic in western and eastern sections of the province.

== See also ==
- List of earthquakes in 1927
- List of earthquakes in Argentina
