= 1952 San Juan earthquake =

Earthquake in Argentina

- Location within Argentina
- UTC time: 1952-06-11 00:31:43
- ISC event: 893012
- USGS-ANSS: ComCat
- Local date: June 10, 1952
- Local time: 21:31:43
- Duration: 8 sec
- Magnitude: 6.8 M_{w}
- Depth: 30 km (19 mi)
- Epicenter: 31.5°S 67.5°W
- Areas affected: Argentina
- Max. intensity: MMI VIII (Severe)
- Casualties: 5 dead

The 1952 San Juan earthquake took place on 11 June at 00:31:43 UTC in the province of San Juan, Argentina. It measured 6.8 on the moment magnitude scale with a depth of 30 kilometers (19 mi). The earthquake was felt in San Juan with a maximum of VIII (Severe) on the Mercalli intensity scale. It caused damage in some locations in the south and west of the province, and a small number of casualties.

== See also ==
- List of earthquakes in 1952
- List of earthquakes in Argentina
