= 1894 San Juan earthquake =

Earthquake in Argentina

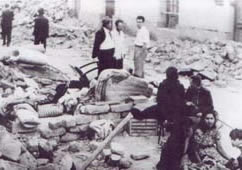
- UTC time: 1894-10-28
- Local date: October 27, 1894
- Local time: 19:30
- Magnitude: 7.5 M_{s}
- Depth: 30 km
- Epicenter: 29.6°S 69.0°W
- Areas affected: Argentina
- Max. intensity: MMI IX (Violent)
- Casualties: ~100

The 1894 San Juan earthquake took place in the province of San Juan, Argentina, on 27 October 1894, at about 07:30 PM. It was the most powerful earthquake recorded in Argentina, with magnitude 7.5 on the surface-wave magnitude scale. Its epicenter was located to the northwest of San Juan, approximately at 29°48′S 69°00′W, and at a depth of 30 km.

The maximum perceived intensity for the earthquake was IX (Violent) on the Mercalli intensity scale. It caused severe damage and about 100 casualties in San Juan and the province of La Rioja, and also caused minor damage in Catamarca, Córdoba, San Luis and Mendoza, up to 500 km away from the epicenter.

== See also ==
- List of earthquakes in Argentina
- List of historical earthquakes
