= 1985 Mendoza earthquake =

1985 earthquake in Mendoza Province, Argentina

- Location within Argentina
- UTC time: 1985-01-26 03:06:57
- ISC event: 535314
- USGS-ANSS: ComCat
- Local date: January 26, 1985
- Local time: 12:06 a.m.
- Magnitude: 6.2 M_{s}
- Depth: 5.0 km (3.1 mi)
- Epicenter: 32.883°S 68.816°W
- Areas affected: Argentina, Mendoza Province
- Max. intensity: MMI VIII (Severe)
- Casualties: 6 dead, 238 injured

The 1985 Mendoza earthquake occurred with medium intensity in the province of Mendoza, Argentina. It took place 7 minutes after midnight on 26 January 1985, and had a magnitude of 6.2 in the Richter scale. Its epicenter was located about 45 km southwest of Mendoza, the provincial capital, at the southern end of the region's pre-Andes range, and at a depth of 5 km. It was felt as grade VIII in the Mercalli intensity scale.

The earthquake caused 6 deaths and about 100 injuries. In the affected Greater Mendoza area, where most of the provincial population is concentrated, one third of the buildings were built of adobe. Some 23,000 homes were destroyed or condemned, though the actual number might have been larger. Estimates vary between 50,000 and 100,000 people left homeless.

A report released soon afterwards stated that the main reason why the event did not produce thousands of casualties was its short duration (less than 10 seconds). In addition, the fact that it was a summer Friday night might have led many people to be sitting outside their homes, chatting with their neighbors, rather than sleeping inside.
