= Zonda Department =

Zonda Departamento Zonda
- Department
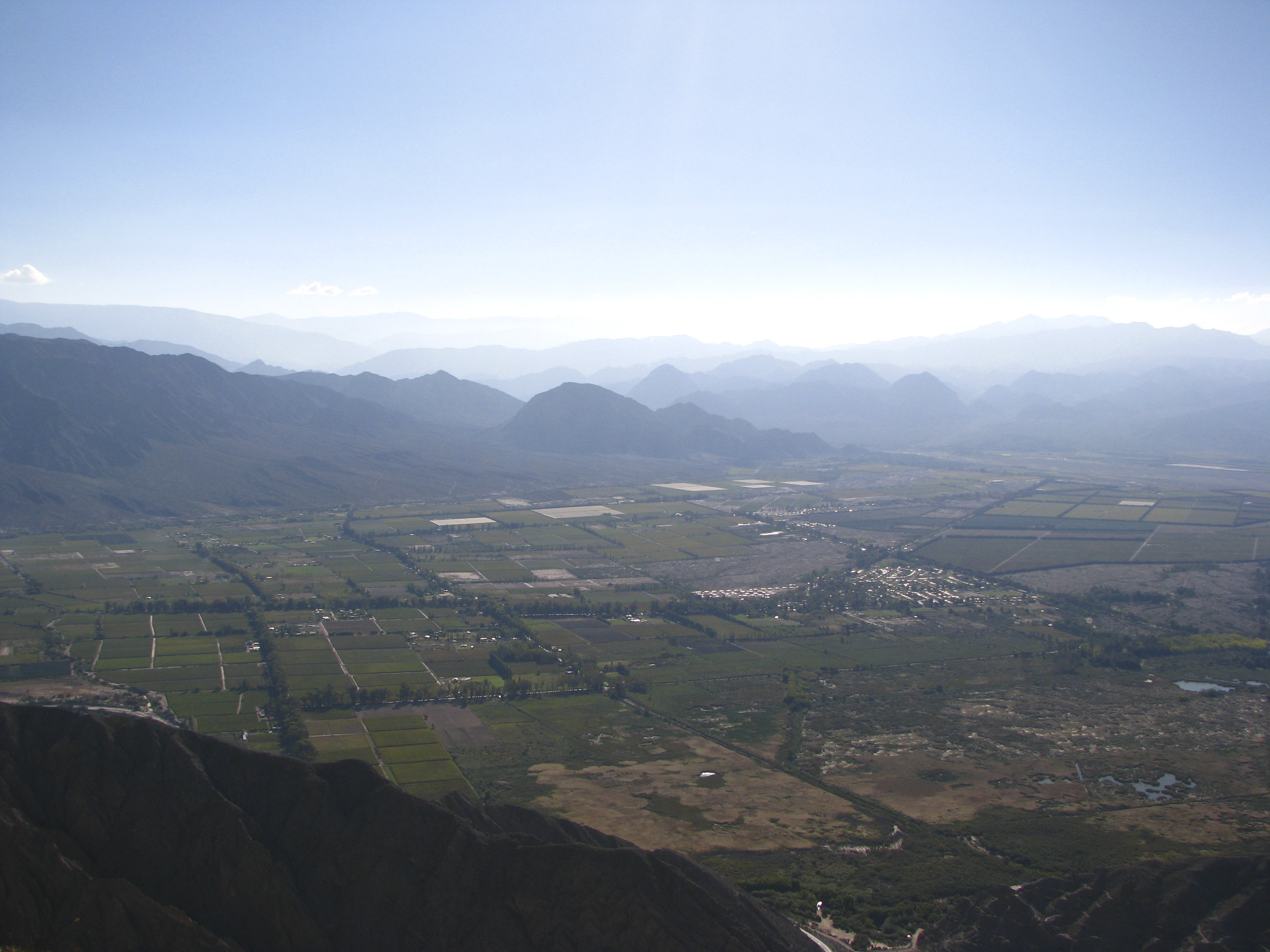
- View of Zonda Valley, the most populous area of the department, located in its north-eastern corner.

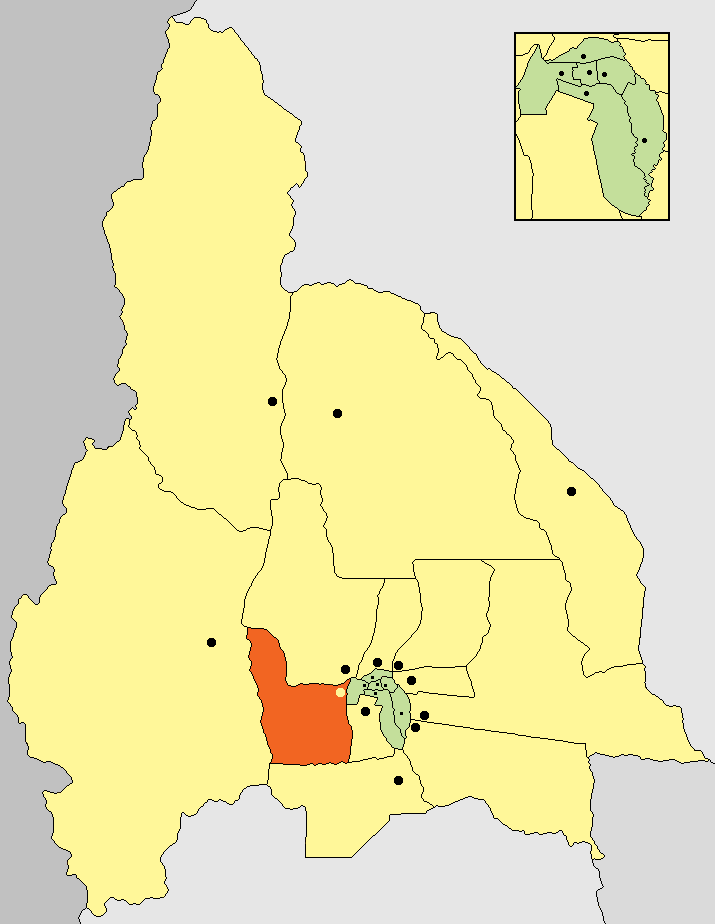
- location of Departamento Zonda in San Juan Province
- Coordinates: 31°33′S 68°46′W
- Country: Argentina
- Province: San Juan
- Established: 1935
- Seat: Villa Basilio Nievas

Area
  - Total: 2,360 km^{2} (910 sq mi)

Population (2010 census [INDEC])
  - Total: 4,863
  - Density: 2.06/km^{2} (5.34/sq mi)
- Demonym: zondino/zondina
- Time zone: UTC-03:00
- Postal codes in Argentina: 5400
- Area code: 0264
- Patron saint: Our Lady of Mount Carmel

Zonda Department (Spanish: Departamento Zonda) is an administrative department of San Juan Province in Argentina. Zonda is located in the south of the province, bordered by Ullum Department to the north, Sarmiento Department to the south, Calingasta Department to the east, and Pocito Department and Rivadavia Department to the west.

As of the 2010 INDEC census, Zonda has a population of 4,863, with a density of 2.6 people per square kilometer. It is one of the most sparsely populated regions in the province. The largest settlement within Zonda is concentrated towards the northeast of the department in the village of Villa Basilio Nievas, which is also known simply as "Zonda". Much of the west of the department has a mountainous, rugged terrain that is sparsely populated.

The name of the department comes from indigenous roots, meaning "high sky". Its name refers to the warm wind characteristic of the province. Zonda has a hilly landscape with sparse vegetation and its economy centers around wine and fruit cultivation, as well as tourism.

== History ==
Settlement of the region dates back to the Ullum-Zonda, a community of the Huarpe people of the first millennium. Their presence in the region was characterized by agricultural practices and the production of ceramics. When the Spanish arrived in the region in the 16th century, following the establishment of San Juan de la Frontera, they did not immediately settle in Zonda. As time progressed and the empire expanded, the Huarpe people of the area began to disappear.

The late 17th and 18th centuries saw the beginning of Spanish agricultural conversion of the region, when land owners such as Matias Sanchez de Loria and Cornelius Albarracín (maternal grandfather of Domingo Faustino Sarmiento) began using the land to cultivate grapes and olives.

Because the region has been sparsely populated compared to other regions within Argentina, it was initially part of a larger department within San Juan Province which contained the settlements of Marquesado (in present-day Rivadavida) and Villa Ibáñez. Marquesado had been founded in the late 19th century by the Echezarreta brothers, and it popularized the Quebranda de Zonda, a ravine on the district's eastern border, as a summer resort within the province. Zonda did not become an independent department until the 20th century, when a 1935 act separated it from Rivadavida. Its official borders were not defined until 1942, when the organic municipal act of September 4 was enacted. The department's largest settlement, Villa Basilio Nievas, was established as the government seat of Zonda.

== Geography ==
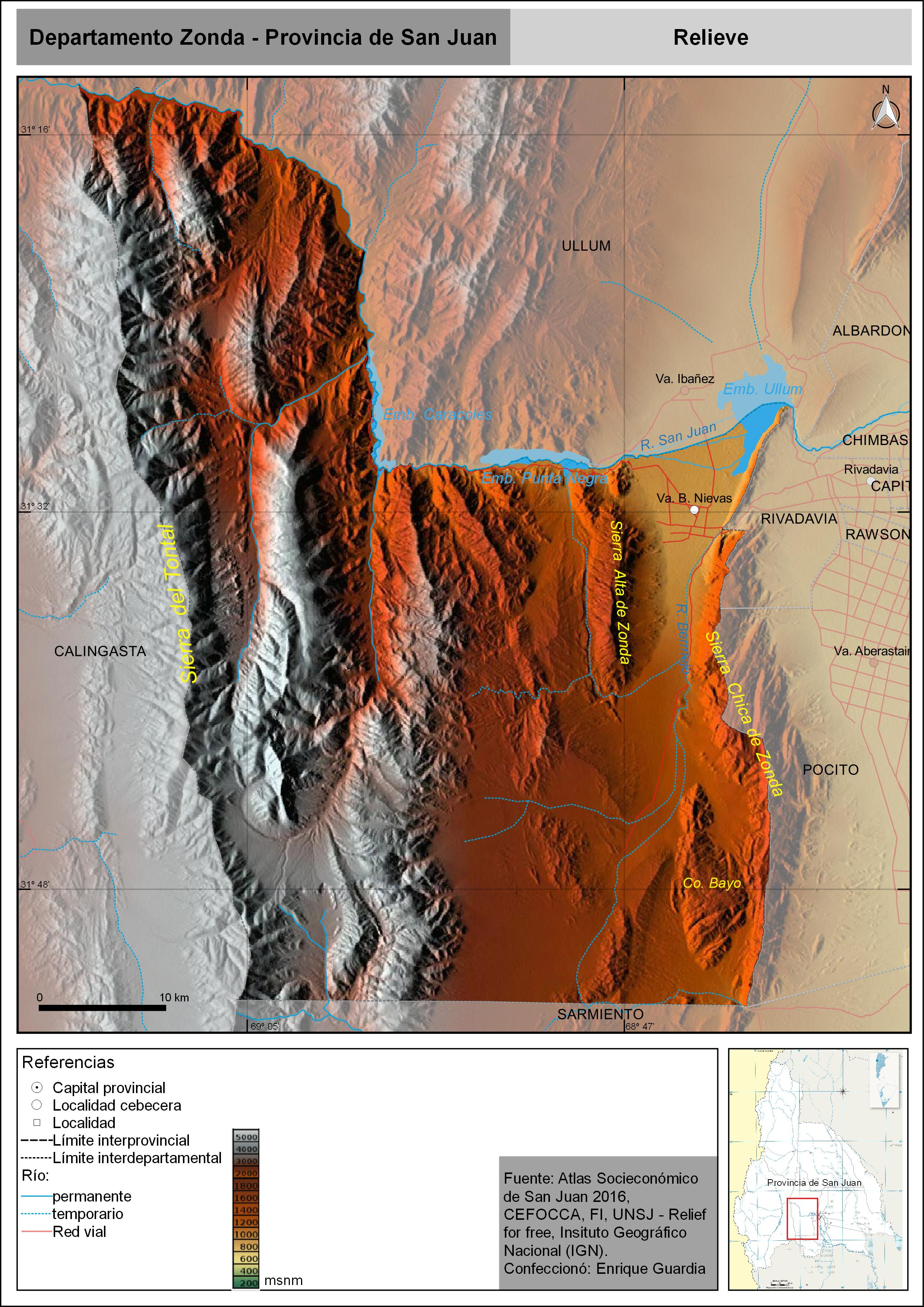
Topographical map of Zonda

Zonda is located in south central San Juan Province, 20 kilometers (12 mi) from the city of San Juan. it has an area of 2,905 square miles (7,520 km^{2}). It is bordered by the departments of Ullum, Sarmiento, Rivadavia, Pocito, and Calingasta. The department has a mountainous landscape, and is dominated by foothills, or precordillera, of the Andes. Its western border is defined by the Sierra de Marquesado and Sierra Chica de Zonda, mountain range, separate Zonda from its neighboring departments of Rivadavia and Pocitot. The Sierra del Tontal constitutes the department's western border with Calingasta. Within the Sierra del Tontal the Chacay and las Cuevas rivers flow into the Sasso River (Spanish: Río Sasso), a tributary of the San Juan River. Its border to the north with Ullum Department is divided by the San Juan River, along which sit the Punta Negra and Los Caracoles dams. The highest mountain peak within Zonda is the Blanco de las Cuevas, reaching 4190 meters in height.

The average annual temperature is around 10 °C (50 °F) with annual temperatures up to 40 °C (104 °F) in summer and in winter below 0 °C (32 °F), with the presence of two dominant winds: a cold southern wind and the Zonda wind, a hot and dry wind flowing from west to east.

In the mountainous western part of the department, the fauna includes cougar, guanacos, condors, eagles, falcons, and owls. The department's natural flora is characterized by prosopis, larrea, genista, totora, and typha.

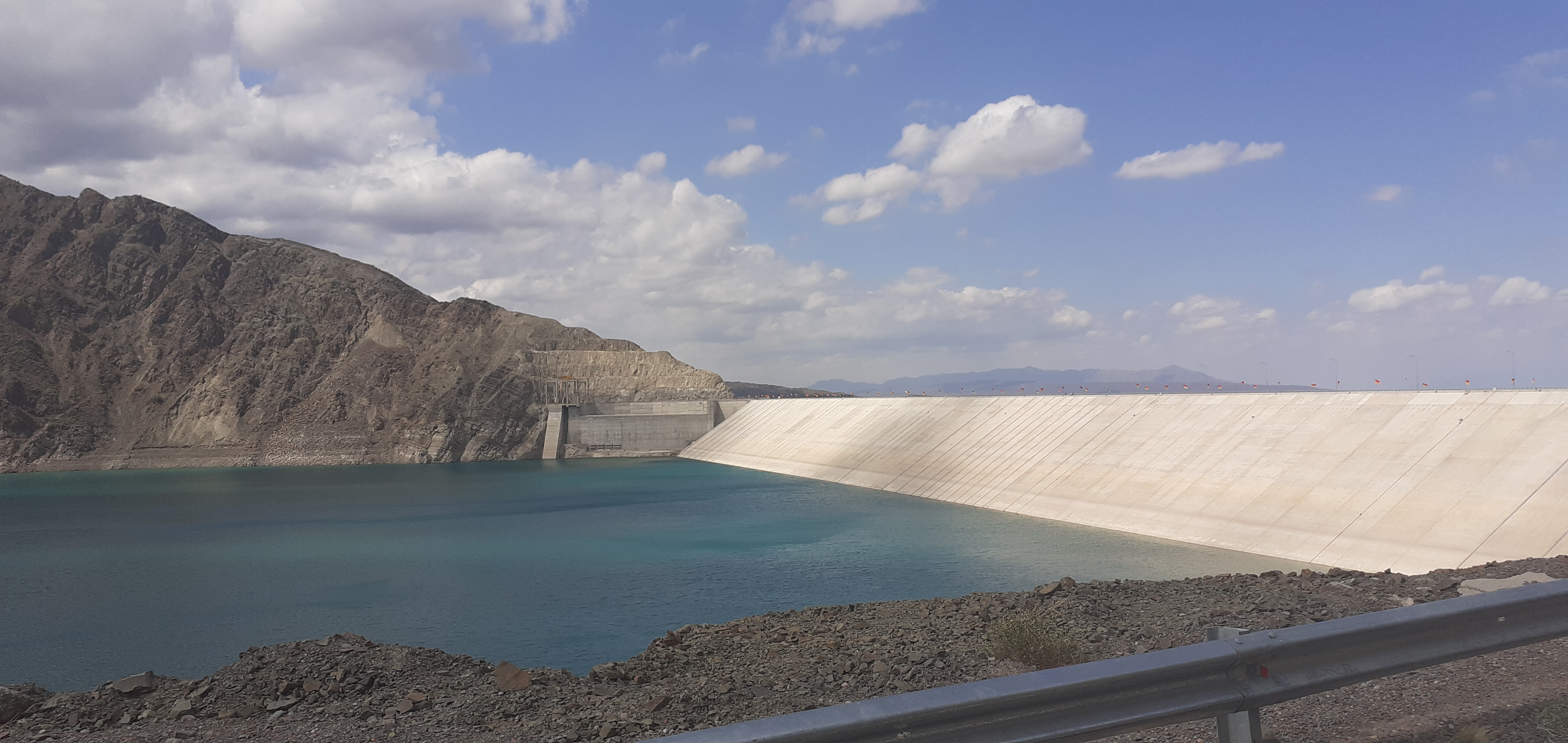
The Punta Negra Dam seen from Ruta Provincial 12 on Zonda's northern border.

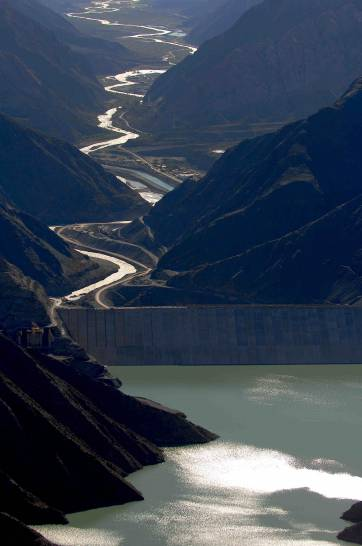
View of the San Juan River leading into the Los Caracoles Dam. To the left is Ullúm Department across the northern border, while Zonda is visible on the right side of the river.

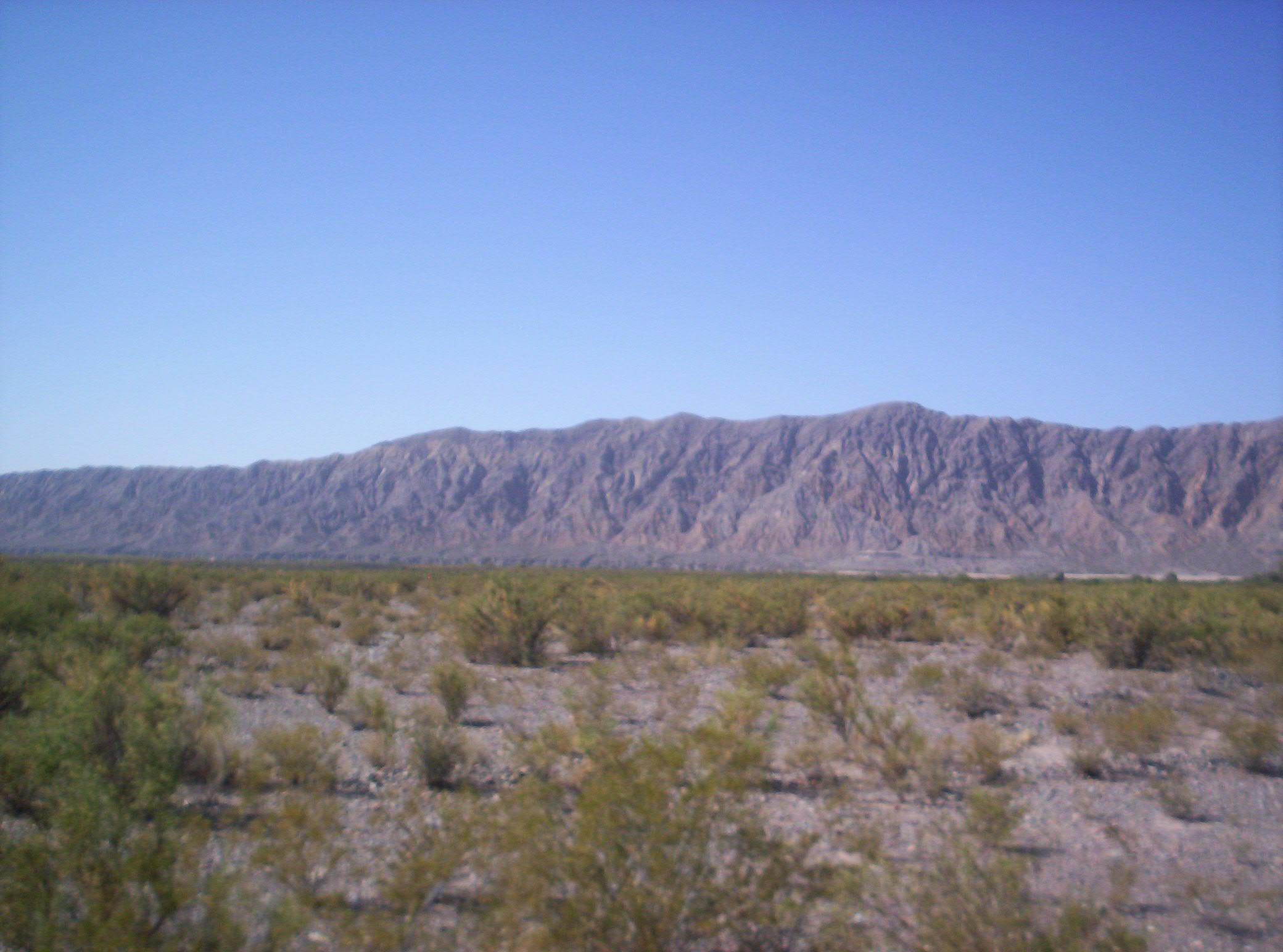
View of the Sierras de Marquesado from Zonda Valley

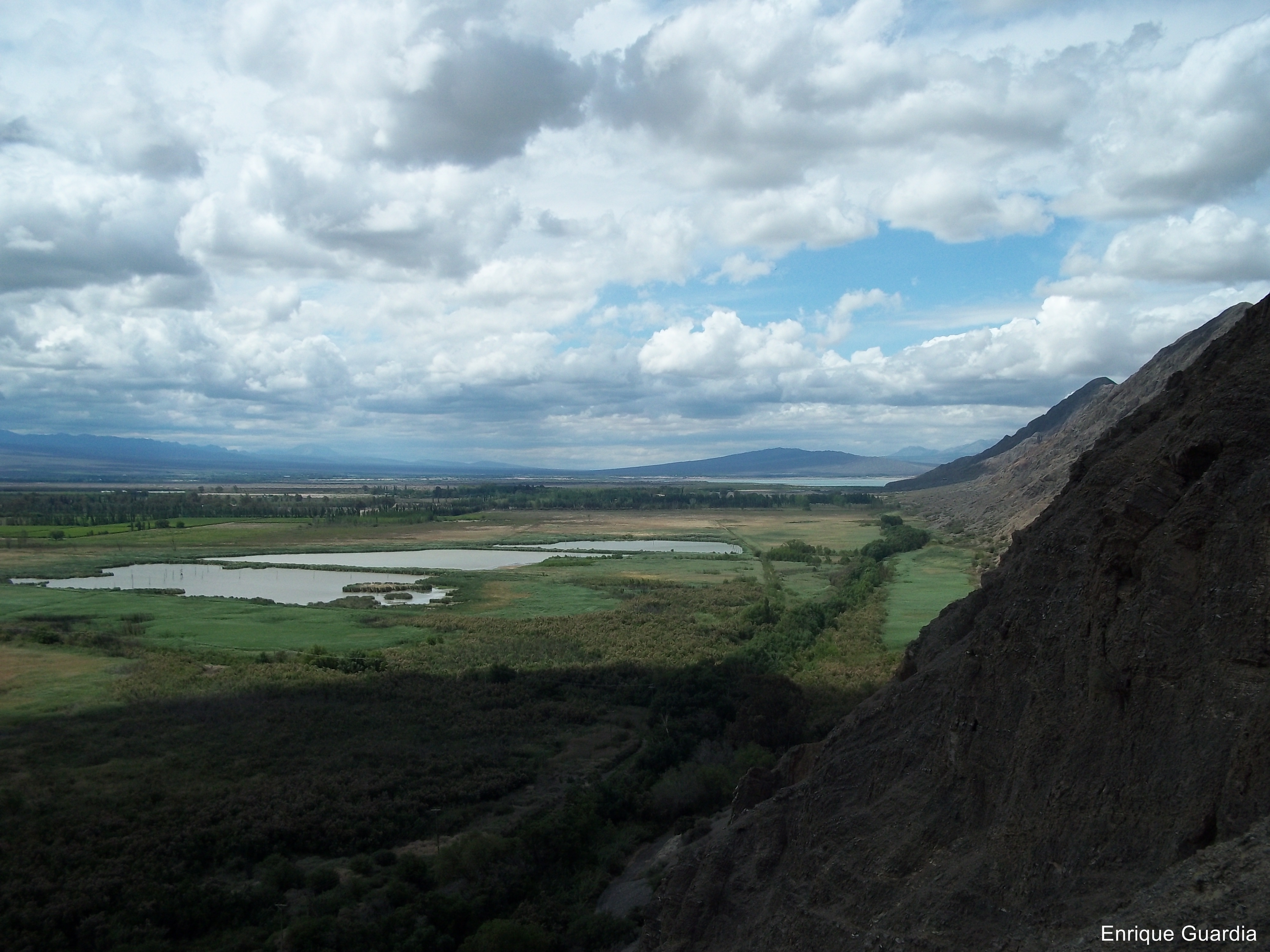
View of the Parque Presidente Sarmiento.

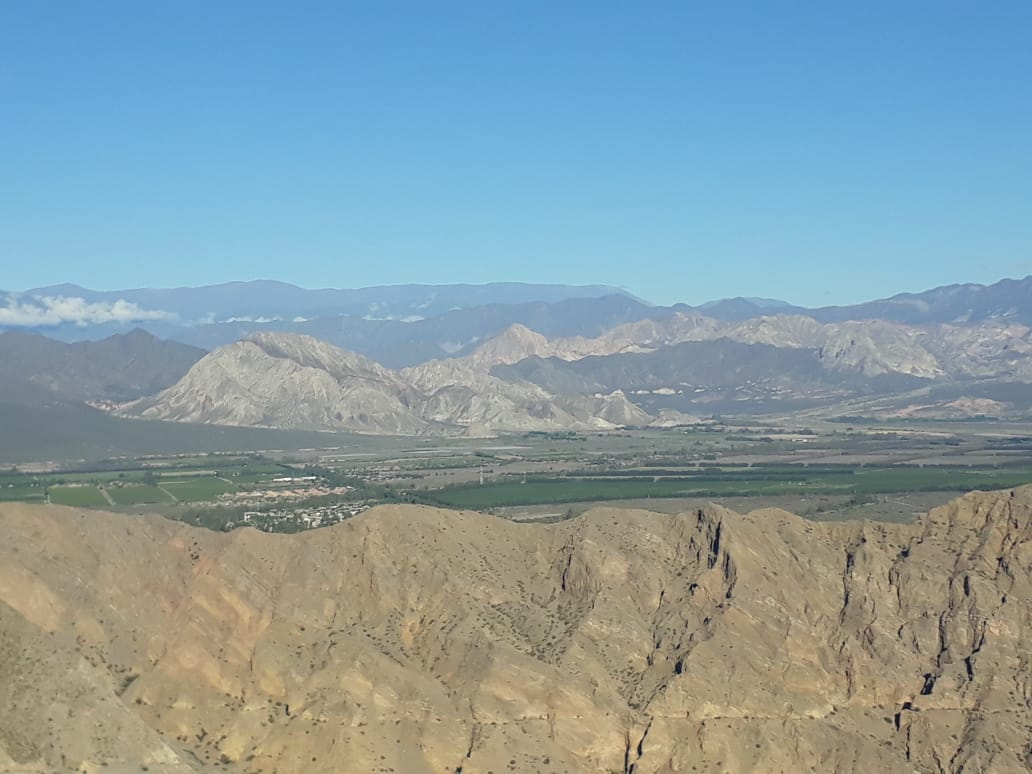
The foothills and mountains surrounding Zonda Valley

== Economy ==
Agriculture is the main economic activity of the department. Around 1950 ha of land are used for agricultural cultivation. Grapes and other fruits, such as blueberries, almonds, plums, and melon. Olive trees, common vegetables, cereals, animal feed, and lumber trees are also cultivated. As much of the agricultural output of the department comes from vineyards, the dominant industrial aspect is represented by wineries.
