= Jáchal Department =

Jáchal Departamento Jáchal
- Department
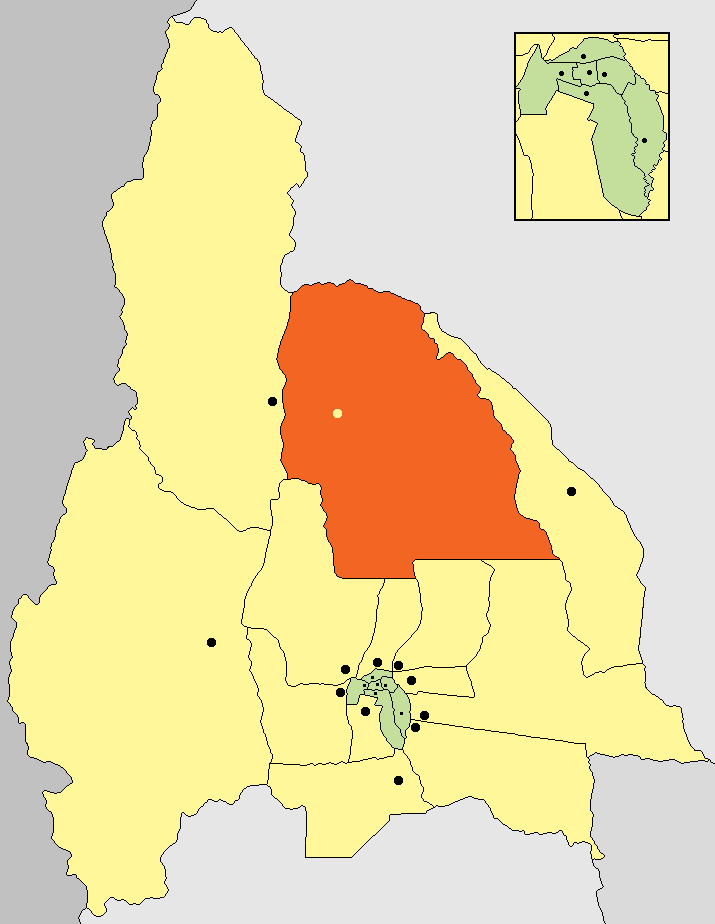
- location of Jáchal Department in San Juan Province
- Coordinates: 30°13′S 68°35′W
- Country: Argentina
- Established: June 25, 1776
- Founder: Juan de Echegaray
- Seat: San José de Jáchal

Government
  - Intendant: Matías Espejo

Area
  - Total: 14,749 km^{2} (5,695 sq mi)

Population (2001 census [INDEC])
  - Total: 21,018
  - Density: 1.4250/km^{2} (3.6909/sq mi)
- Postal Code: SJ5400
- IFAM: SJU007
- Area Code: 0264
- Patron saint: San José
- Website: web.archive.org/web/20080518012354/http://www.jachal.gov.ar/

Jáchal is a department located in San Juan, Argentina. It is characterized by its first level agricultural production, which emphasizes the onion plantations. The department is known as the cradle of tradition at a provincial level.

== Toponymy ==
The name of the department comes from an Indigenous language, meaning "river of the groves" or "land or district of metals".

== Geography ==
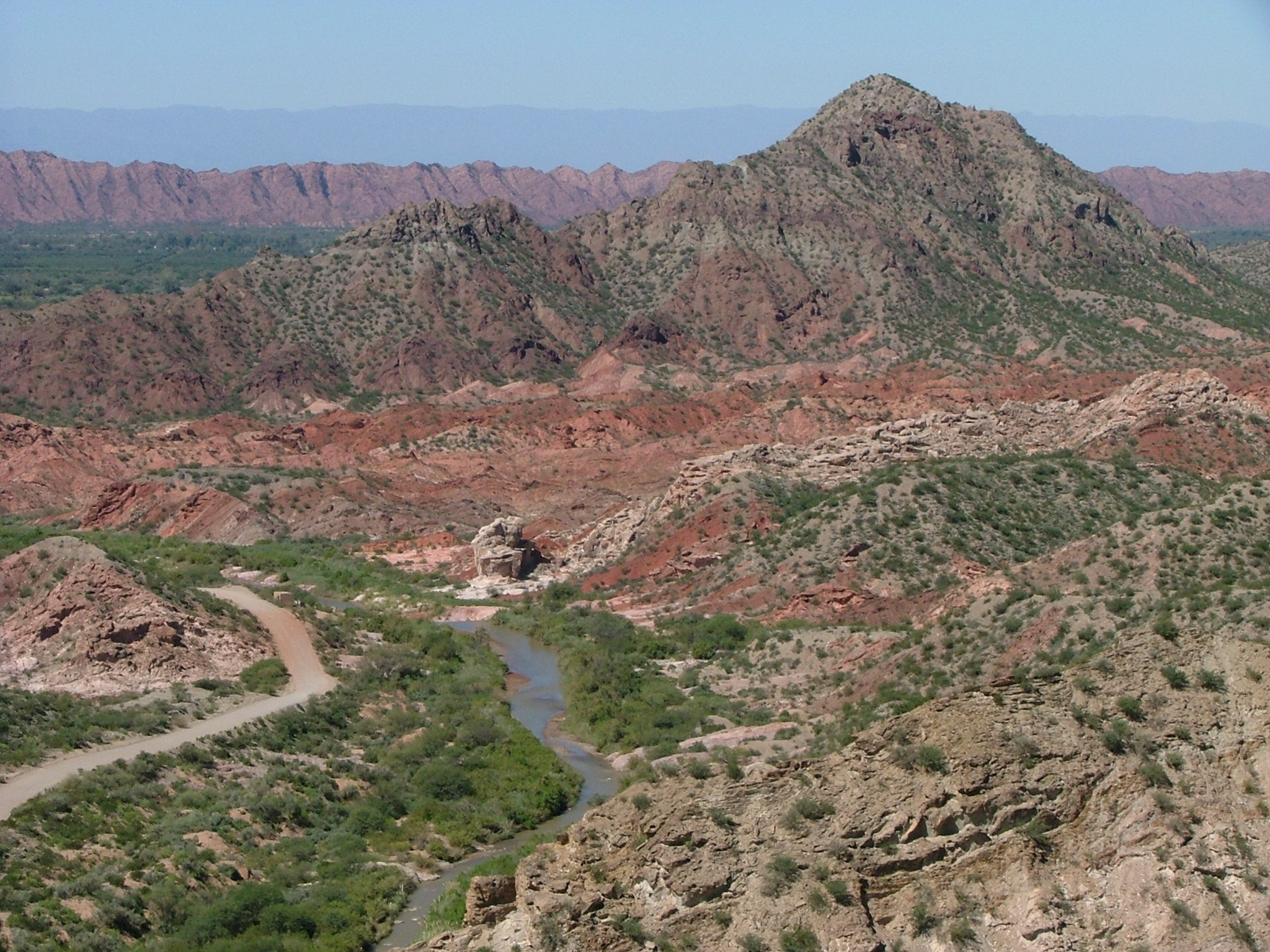
View of the Cuesta de Huaco

Jáchal is in the northern center of the Province of San Juan, north, about 150 km (93 mi) of City of San Juan, it has 14,749 km^{2} (5,695 sq mi), which makes it third place among the departments with the largest province areas, after Calingasta and Iglesia. Its boundaries are:

- North: the Province of La Rioja, Argentina.
- South: departments of Ullum, Albardón, Angaco and Caucete.
- East: the Valle Fértil Department.
- West: the Iglesia Department.

Jáchal's mountains from the edge of the foothills in the direction from north to south, are located to the west forming a natural boundary with the Iglesia Department, highlighting the Colorado, Alto de Mayo, Cañada Amarilla and los Pozos hills. Valle Fértil's mountain ranges surround it, separating the Jáchal and Huaco valleys.

The department is irrigated by Jáchal rivers, second in importance to the provincial level, supplying the homonymous valley, located in the center west of the department. The Huaco river irrigates the homonymous valley and is where the Cauquenes dam is found. It is one of the mirrors of water present in the department next to the Pachimoco and the Bermejo river, a temporary river that feeds on rainwater.

The flora is composed of Larrea (jarillas), retamos, carob trees, chañares, Tessaria absinthioides (pájaro bobo), etc. The fauna is characterized by foxes, rheas, condors, chuñas, partridges, guanacos and silversides, as well as various reptiles and arachnids.

== Economy ==
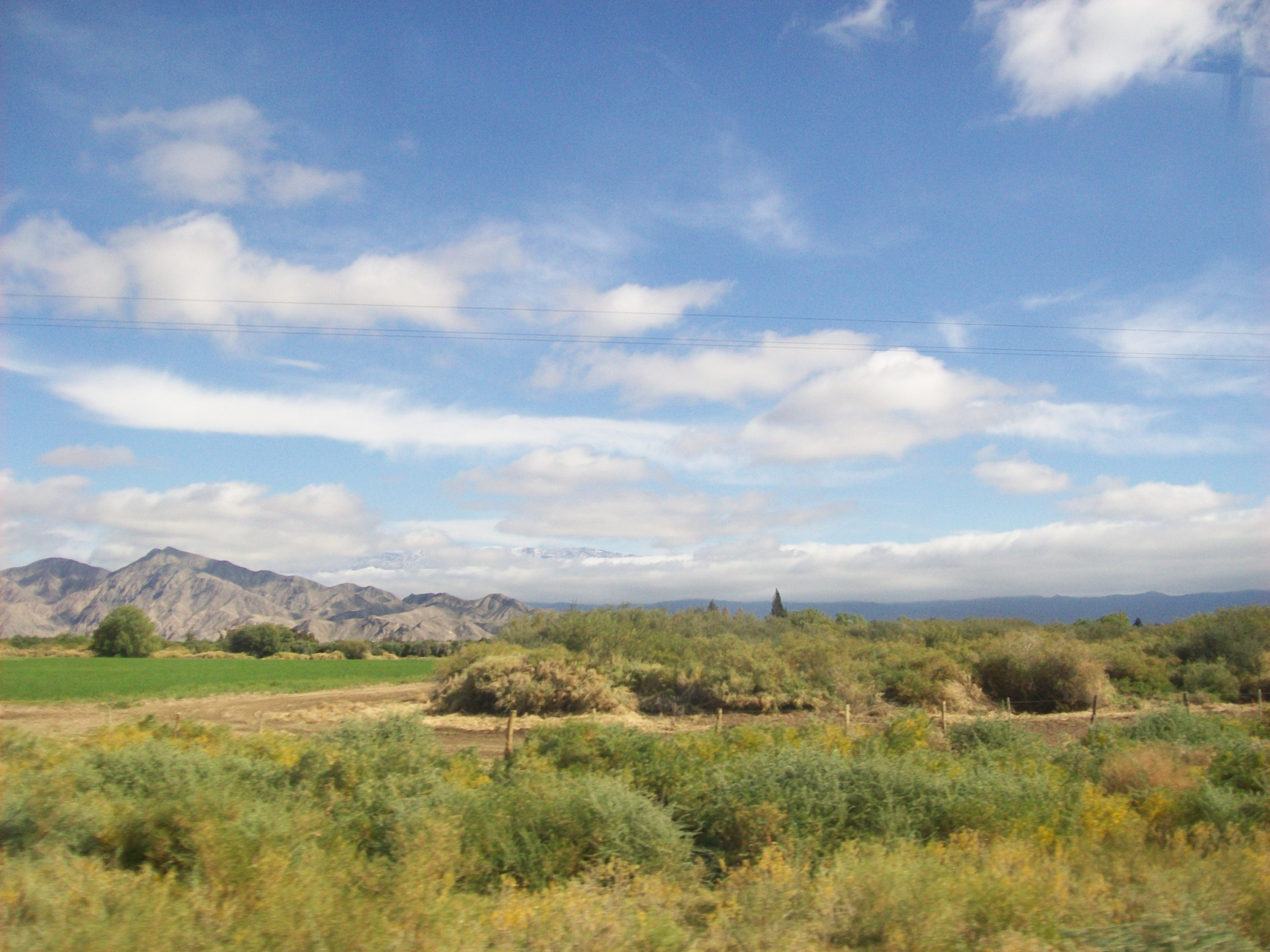
A view of the Valley Jáchal.

Jáchal's economy is centered around agriculture, highlighting numerous plantations of vegetables such as onions, the third most exported product in the province of San Juan after grapevines and olives. Fruit (with a predominance of quince) and alfalfa are also produced.

From 2007 to date, the amount of onion plantations dwindled by 42%, passed 1,122 hectares registered in the last census of Hydraulics, the existing 650 hectares, according to figures from the Association, while the surface with alfalfa increased by 63% from 1584 hectares in 2007 to about 2,500 today. Thus the productive profile of Jáchal occurs much more diversified with the increased area of alfalfa and to a lesser extent, stands the tomato.

In 2008, a multinational company dedicated to mining successfully launched in this jurisdiction a mine, from which to draw gold. It is located above the 2,000 m. It is the Gualcamayo Project, located north of the department, in the Quebrada del Diablo area, 10 kilometers from the National Route 40. It is an open-pit mine with mineral crushing that is later leached with cyanide and subsequent precipitation with activated coal. This will provide gold metal bars, which then go to refineries.

== Tourism ==
In the Midwest of the Jáchal valley is the city of San José de Jáchal, a town with long streets connecting the center to green fields, mountains and the turbulent Jáchal river. It offers places like the Archdiocesan Sanctuary of San José, declared national historic monument. During the month of November, the Fiesta Provincial de la Tradición is celebrated, where local and national performers do shows, handicrafts are exhibited, traditional food is sold, etc.

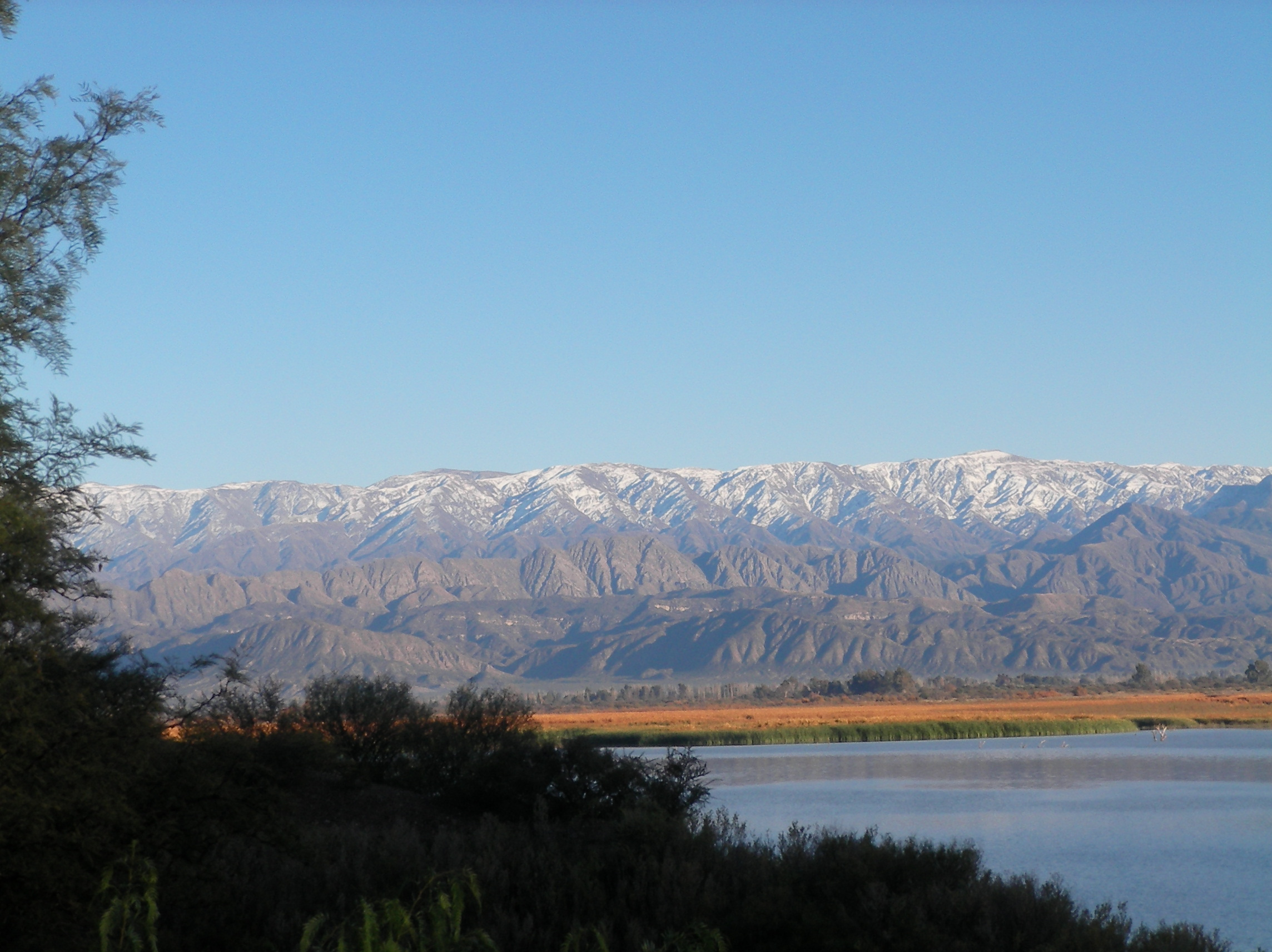
View of the Cauquenes dam

The Cauquenes Reservoir dam is located at 1,100 m. The reservoir, also known as Dique de Huaco or Dique de Los Lisos, is especially famous among competitive fishers for the presence of silversides.

Mogna is located south of the province. It is home to one of the most popular celebrations of Jáchal, La Fiesta de Santa Bárbara. It is celebrated on the 4th day of December and convenes more than 20,000 devotees from San Juan to honor Saint Barbara. The festivities include the participation of the Bishop of San Juan. The presentation of important folk artists and the sampling of regional foods are the main attractions of the festival.

Jáchal's flour mills are more than two centuries old. In the past, flour production in the province not only supplied the local market but also those across the country, including Buenos Aires, Córdoba and Tucuman.

In order to ensure their preservation, Jáchal's mills along with Huaco's and Iglesia's were declared National Historic Monument. Sardiña Mill still preserves its wooden machinery of carob, along with Pérez and Reyes Mill, which dates back to colonial times.

Jáchal River Gorge: The canyon, which rises 30 meters above the Jachal River, provides a setting for recreational activities such as rafting and kayaking. The narrow gorge and strong water currents sceate numerous rapids and waterfalls. Water currents reach speed of 30 to 40 km/h, creating challenging conditions for inflatable boats navigating the gorge.

Other attractions can be highlighted Huachi Huerta, a place surrounded by fruit trees product of a microclimate. The garden is forested with walnut trees, olive trees, grapevines and fig trees. Villa Mercedes, 15 km from the city of Jáchal, the largest population center north jáchallero has valuable attractions such as: Church of La Merced, a community complex that offers services with supply, health, camping and resort to the loom and Crafts Factory of regional products: pancakes jachalleras and Camping Municipal "The Nursery" located on the National Route 150, it has health services, tables and barbecues.
