= Ullúm Department =

Ullum
- Department
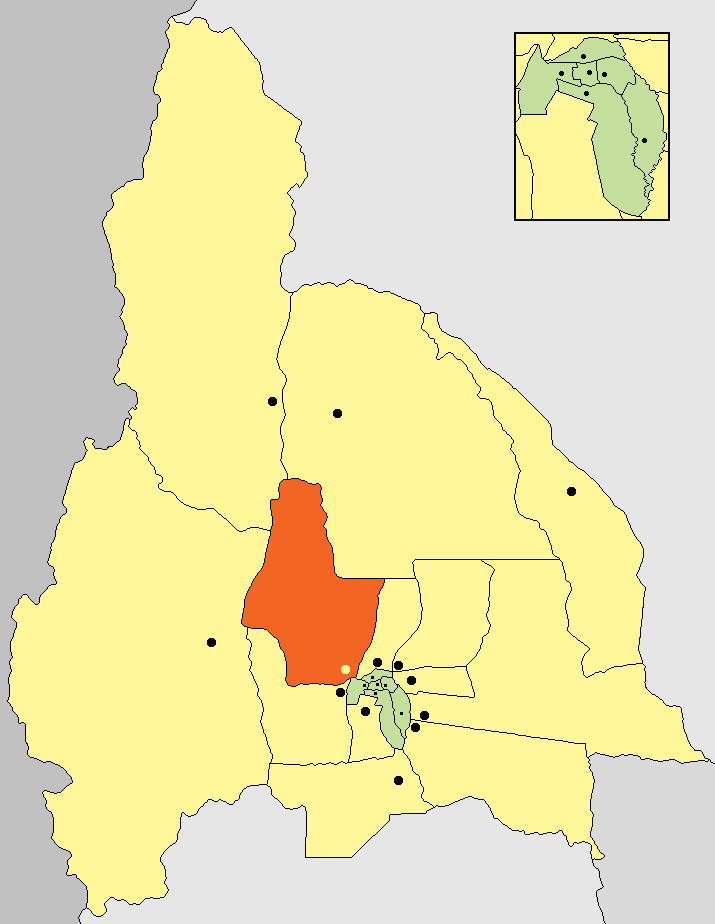
- Location of Ullum Department in San Juan Province
- Coordinates: 31°25′S 68°43′W
- Country: Argentina
- Established: 17 December 1869
- Seat: Villa Ibañez

Government
  - Intendant: David Domínguez

Area
  - Total: 4,397 km^{2} (1,698 sq mi)

Population (2001 census [INDEC])
  - Total: 4,498
  - Density: 1.023/km^{2} (2.649/sq mi)
- Demonym: ullunero/a
- Postal Code: 5400
- IFAM: SJU01
- Area Code: 0264
- Patron saint: Virgen del Carmen

Ullum is a department of the Argentinean province of San Juan. It is located in the center of the province and its landscape is dominated by mountains and low vegetation. Its seat is Villa Ibáñez. It is also characterized by the production of grapes and fruit. The San Juan River is dammed by the Ullum Dam.

== Origin of name ==
The name of this department is of Indian origin, translated as head of the penis. This may refer to the place where rituals were held for aspiring young Aboriginal warriors or to the fertility of the land in the area, alluding directly to male fertility.

== Geography ==
The department is located in the center west of the San Juan Province, northwest of the City of San Juan. It has a surface area of 4,391 square kilometers. It is bordered by:

- Jáchal Department to the north
- Zonda Department and Rivadavia Department to the south
- Albardón Department to the east
- Calingasta Department, Zonda Department and Iglesia Department to the west.

Ullum is entirely located on the center and foothills of the San Juan Cordillera. Between the mountains are prominent hills: the Lomadas de Las Tapias, Talacasto, Dehesa and Villicum to the east and the Sierra del Tigre and Sierra de la Invernada to the west. In the south of the department the San Juan River is dammed by the Ullum Dam.

The climate is arid with little precipitation. Temperature ranges from 35 °C (95 °F) in summer (with highs up to 40 °C (104 °F)) to 16 °C (61 °F) during the dry winters, with lows of −8 °C (18 °F). The climate is influenced by the Ullum dam lake and by occasional snowfall in the Talacasto area.

The flora is characterized by xerophytes. The fauna includes species such as hares, puma, viscachas, Elegant Crested Tinamous, guanacos, various forest birds and silversides.
