= Calingasta Department =

Calingasta Departamento Calingasta
- Department
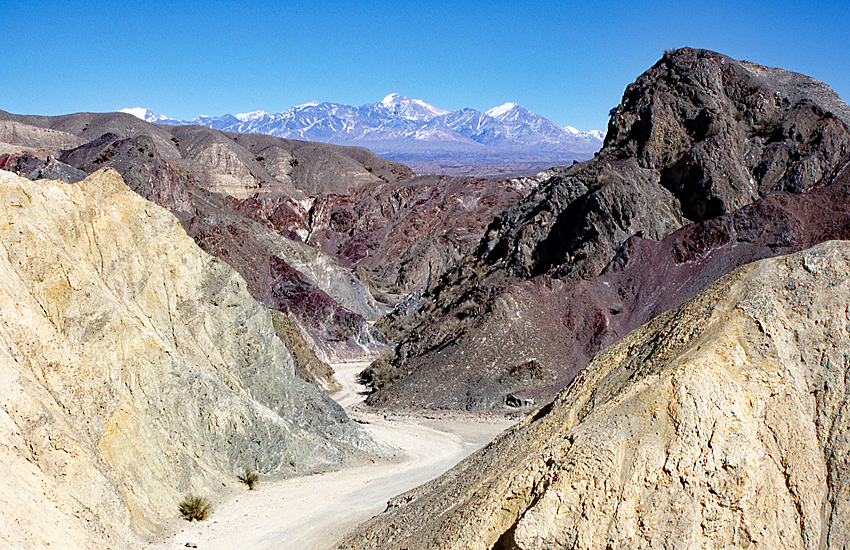
- Andean mountain scenery in Calingasta

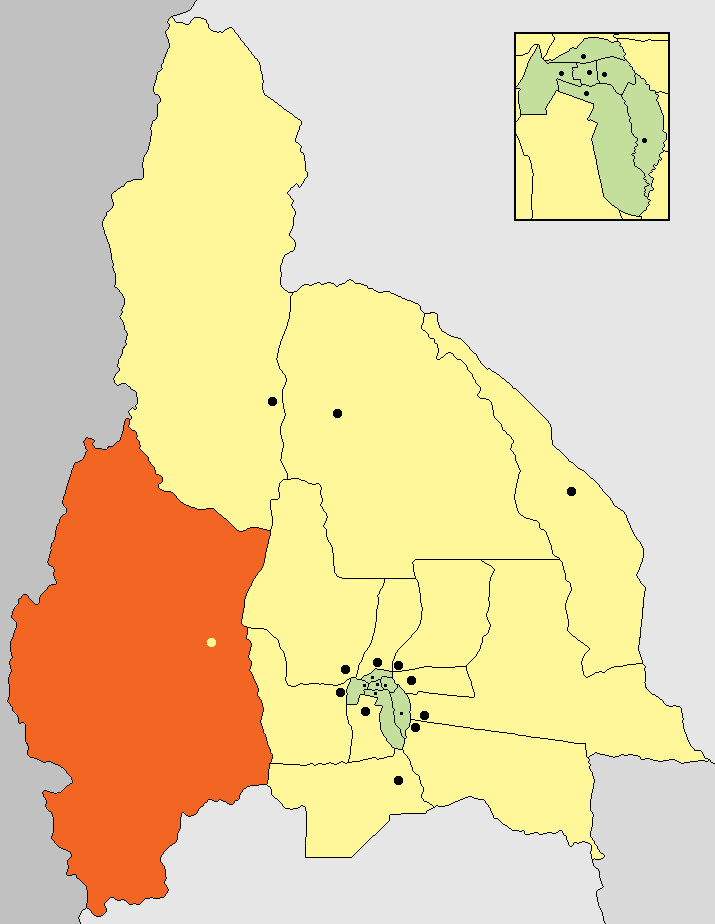
- location of Calingasta Department in San Juan Province
- Coordinates: 31°22′S 69°30′W
- Country: Argentina
- Established: December 17, 1869
- Seat: Tamberías

Government
  - Intendant: Sebastian Alberto Carbajal

Area
  - Total: 22,589 km^{2} (8,722 sq mi)

Population (2001 census [INDEC])
  - Total: 8,176
  - Density: 0.3619/km^{2} (0.9374/sq mi)
- Postal Code: SJ5400
- IFAM: SJU003
- Area Code: 0264
- Patron saint: San José

Calingasta is a department of the province of San Juan (Argentina). It is the southwestern corner of the province, which is predominantly a landscape of mountains and rivers. It is characterized by its production of apples and by tourism, mainly in the tourist towns of Barreal and Tamberías

== Origin of name ==
Several meanings that have been given to an indigenous root of this word. People of the inhabitants of Calían. Skirt or safe or major hills. Transforming Catalve "(River of the hillside), as the area was called Calingasta prior to the arrival of the Spaniards.

== Geography ==
The department Calingasta comprises the southwest corner of the province of San Juan. It is 217 kilometres (135 miles) west of the city of San Juan with an area of 22,589 square kilometres (8,722 sq mi). Its boundaries are:

- To the north with the Iglesia Department
- To the south with the Mendoza Province
- To the east with the departments of Sarmiento, Zonda, and Ullum
- To the west with the Republic of Chile

=== Relief ===
Calingasta has a rugged, mountainous topography due to its location at the foot of the Andes. Mount Mercedario is the eighth-highest mountain of the Andes with an altitude of 6,720 metres (22,050 ft). It is located 100 kilometres (62 mi) north of Aconcagua. The precordillera range is the Sierra del Tontal, separating the region from the arid plains to the east. The soil is mainly desert with little vegetation cover except on the river banks in the valleys.

=== Climate ===
The climate is mostly desert with little precipitation, highlighting marked thermal variations, with notable differences in temperature between night and day.
