= Martina Chapanay =

Argentine guerrilla fighter (1799–c.1887)

Martina Chapanay (March 9, 1799 – c. 1887) was a guerrilla fighter who was involved in the Argentine Civil Wars in the 19th century.

The memory of her efforts to steal from the rich and give to the poor during her time as a highwaywoman has made her grave in the town of Mogna a site of popular worship.

== Early life ==
In 1799, Martina Chapanay was born in the Lagunas de Guanacache, between the modern-day Argentine provinces of San Juan and Mendoza, in what was then the Viceroyalty of the Río de la Plata. Much of her biography is told as legend and is difficult to confirm in the historical record.

Her father was Ambrosio Chapanay, a Huarpe cacique, and her mother was Mercedes González, a white woman from San Juan. The name Chapanay comes from the Huarpe Millcayac language: Chapac nay means "swampy area." Some contradictory accounts indicate her father was an Indigenous man from the Gran Chaco who was sheltering among the Huarpe, and her mother's name was actually Teodora.

As a girl, Chapanay displayed exceptional skills in equestrianism and knife-fighting. When her mother died, her father sent her to be raised by a woman named Clara Sánchez, who educated her. However, she fled and chose to fight as a montonera, after which she began to dress as a male gaucho.

== Argentine Civil Wars ==
Chapanay went to live with the Huarpe and became a thief and a highwaywoman, sharing what she stole among the poor. This earned her a reputation as a sort of "female Robin Hood." As part of the Argentine Civil Wars, she also offered her services to General José de San Martín, who appointed her chasqui, or messenger, of the army.

Then, she took up with the bandit Cruz Cuero, the leader of a gang that terrorized the region for years. This relationship ended in tragedy when Chapanay came to the defense a young man whom the gang had kidnapped. Cruz beat Chapanay and shot the young man dead, but she killed Cruz with a spear in turn and took over as leader of the gang.

Around 1820, Chapanay and her crew joined forces with the caudillo Facundo Quiroga. She participated in perhaps a dozen battles in the 1820s and '30s. She also fought alongside Ángel Vicente Peñaloza, another caudillo. Years later, in the 1860s, she was offered a pardon and a position as sergeant major in the San Juan security forces. In that organization, she came across Pablo Irrazábal, the commander who had killed Peñaloza. Chapanay challenged him to a duel, but Irrazábal fled the scene in fear and later resigned rather than fight her.

== Death and legacy ==
Chapanay died around 1887 in Mogna, where she spent her final years. It is said that a local official covered her grave with white slab, without any inscription, because "everyone knows who is here." Her grave is now a site of popular worship among those who recall her generosity toward the poor.

In 2001, the singer León Gieco, in partnership with the historian Hugo Chumbita, produced the album Bandidos rurales, which mentions Chapanay. The singer Hilario Cuadros also wrote a cueca song called "La Martina Chapanay."

The writer Mabel Pagano published a book based on her life, Martina Chapanay, montonera del Zonda, in 2000.
