= Río Blanco (Argentina) =

Location
- Country: Argentina

Physical characteristics
- Mouth
  - location: Jáchal River

The Río Blanco (Spanish for "white river") is a river of Argentina that rises high in the mountains west of San José de Jáchal in the northern part of the province of San Juan. It is a tributary of the Jáchal River which empties into the Desaguadero River basin.

== See also ==
- List of rivers of Argentina
