= 2004–05 Pontevedra CF season =

Pontevedra CF
2004–05 season
- President: Saturnino Mirón Gutiérrez
- Head coach: José Aurelio Gay; Alberto Argibay Pazos
- Stadium: Estadio Municipal de Pasarón
- Segunda División: 22nd (relegated)
- Copa del Rey: Round of 32
- Top goalscorer: League: Javi Rodríguez (16); All: Javi Rodríguez (17)
- Biggest win: Pontevedra 5–0 Lleida

The 2004–05 Pontevedra Club de Fútbol season was the club's 64th season in existence and the club's first season in the second division of Spanish football since 1977. In addition to the domestic league, Pontevedra participated in this season's edition of the Copa del Rey. The team missed out on a second-year stay in the Segunda División in the penultimate matchday.

== Players ==
=== First-team squad ===
Note: Flags indicate national team as defined under FIFA eligibility rules; some limited exceptions apply. Players may hold more than one non-FIFA nationality.

No.	Pos.	Nation	Player
—	GK	PER	Francisco Bazán
—	GK	ESP	Joaquín Moso
—	DF	VEN	José Manuel Rey
—	DF	ESP	Fede Bahón
—	DF	ESP	Luciano
—	DF	ESP	Alejandro Vázquez Palacio
—	DF	NGA	Albert Yobo
—	DF	ESP	Mauro García
—	MF	ESP	Juan Navarro

No.	Pos.	Nation	Player
—	MF	ESP	José Luis Cabrera
—	MF	ESP	Asier Salcedo
—	MF	ESP	Juan Jesús
—	MF	ARG	César Garipe
—	FW	ESP	Javi Rodríguez
—	FW	ESP	José Luis Capdevila
—	FW	ESP	Manuel Canabal
—	FW	BRA	Charles

== Competitions ==
=== Overview ===
Competition	First match	Last match	Starting round	Final position	Record							
Competition	First match	Last match	Starting round	Final position	Pld	W	D	L	GF	GA	GD	Win %
Segunda División	28 August 2004	17 June 2005	Matchday 1	22nd	42	10	14	18	52	60	−8	23.81
Copa del Rey	27 October 2004	10 November 2004	Round of 64	Round of 32	2	1	0	1	4	4	+0	50.00
Total					44	11	14	19	56	64	−8	25.00

Source: Competitions

=== Segunda División ===
==== League table ====
Pos	Team	Pld	W	D	L	GF	GA	GD	Pts	Promotion or relegation
18	Ciudad de Murcia	42	10	17	15	49	57	−8	47	
19	Córdoba (R)	42	12	10	20	43	52	−9	46	Relegation to Segunda División B
20	Terrassa (R)	42	12	8	22	45	63	−18	44 (Note: TER: 8 pts; SAL: 6 pts; PON: 4 pts)	Relegation to Segunda División B
21	Salamanca (R)	42	12	8	22	50	63	−13	44	Relegation to Segunda División B
22	Pontevedra (R)	42	10	14	18	52	60	−8	44	Relegation to Segunda División B

Source: LFP – Liga Adelante
Rules for classification: 1st points; 2nd head-to-head points; 3rd head-to-head goal difference; 4th head-to-head goals scored; 5th goal difference; 6th number of goals scored; 7th Fair-play points
(R) Relegated

==== Results summary ====
Overall								Home						Away					
Pld	W	D	L	GF	GA	GD	Pts	W	D	L	GF	GA	GD	W	D	L	GF	GA	GD
42	10	14	18	52	60	−8	44	6	9	6	36	28	+8	4	5	12	16	32	−16

==== Results by round ====
Round	1	2	3	4	5	6	7	8	9	10	11	12	13	14	15	16	17	18	19	20	21	22	23	24	25	26	27	28	29	30	31	32	33	34	35	36	37	38	39	40	41	42
Ground	H	A	H	A	H	A	A	H	A	H	A	H	A	H	A	H	A	H	A	H	A	A	H	A	H	A	H	H	A	H	A	H	A	H	A	H	A	H	A	H	A	H
Result	L	D	D	W	D	W	L	D	L	L	L	L	D	L	L	L	L	D	L	D	L	L	D	L	W	D	D	L	L	W	W	W	L	W	L	D	D	W	W	D	D	W
Position	16	18	18	15	15	10	13	11	16	18	19	20	20	20	20	21	21	21	21	21	21	21	21	22	22	22	22	22	22	22	22	21	22	21	21	22	22	22	21	22	22	22

A = Away; H = Home; W = Win; D = Draw; L = Loss

==== Matches ====
28 August 2004 1	Pontevedra	0–1	Polideportivo Ejido	Pontevedra
CEST (UTC+2)				Stadium: Estadio Municipal de Pasarón

5 September 2004 2	Córdoba	0–0	Pontevedra	Córdoba
CEST (UTC+2)

12 September 2004 3	Pontevedra	2–2	Elche	Pontevedra
CEST (UTC+2)				Stadium: Estadio Municipal de Pasarón

19 September 2004 4	Valladolid	0–1	Pontevedra	Valladolid
CEST (UTC+2)

25 September 2004 5	Pontevedra	1–1	Tenerife	Pontevedra
CEST (UTC+2)				Stadium: Estadio Municipal de Pasarón

3 October 2004 6	Ciudad de Murcia	2–3	Pontevedra	Murcia
CEST (UTC+2)

10 October 2004 7	Alavés	3–2	Pontevedra	Vitoria-Gasteiz
CEST (UTC+2)

16 October 2004 8	Pontevedra	3–3	Terrassa	Pontevedra
CEST (UTC+2)				Stadium: Estadio Municipal de Pasarón

23 October 2004 9	Xerez	1–0	Pontevedra	Jerez de la Frontera
CEST (UTC+2)

31 October 2004 10	Pontevedra	2–3	Eibar	Pontevedra
CET (UTC+1)				Stadium: Estadio Municipal de Pasarón

7 November 2004 11	Lleida	3–0	Pontevedra	Lleida
CET (UTC+1)

14 November 2004 12	Pontevedra	0–2	Almería	Pontevedra
CET (UTC+1)				Stadium: Estadio Municipal de Pasarón

21 November 2004 13	Gimnàstic	0–0	Pontevedra	Tarragona
CET (UTC+1)

28 November 2004 14	Pontevedra	1–2	Sporting Gijón	Pontevedra
CET (UTC+1)				Stadium: Estadio Municipal de Pasarón

4 December 2004 15	Recreativo de Huelva	2–1	Pontevedra	Huelva
CET (UTC+1)

12 December 2004 16	Pontevedra	0–1	Murcia	Pontevedra
CET (UTC+1)				Stadium: Estadio Municipal de Pasarón

19 December 2004 17	Celta Vigo	2–0	Pontevedra	Vigo
CET (UTC+1)

23 December 2004 18	Pontevedra	1–1	Racing Ferrol	Pontevedra
CET (UTC+1)				Stadium: Estadio Municipal de Pasarón

9 January 2005 19	Cádiz	4–0	Pontevedra	Cádiz
CET (UTC+1)

16 January 2005 20	Pontevedra	1–1	Málaga B	Pontevedra
CET (UTC+1)				Stadium: Estadio Municipal de Pasarón

23 January 2005 21	Salamanca	2–0	Pontevedra	Salamanca
CET (UTC+1)

29 January 2005 22	Polideportivo Ejido	1–0	Pontevedra	El Ejido
CET (UTC+1)

6 February 2005 23	Pontevedra	1–1	Córdoba	Pontevedra
CET (UTC+1)				Stadium: Estadio Municipal de Pasarón

13 February 2005 24	Elche	2–0	Pontevedra	Elche
CET (UTC+1)

19 February 2005 25	Pontevedra	3–0	Valladolid	Pontevedra
CET (UTC+1)				Stadium: Estadio Municipal de Pasarón

27 February 2005 26	Tenerife	0–0	Pontevedra	Santa Cruz de Tenerife
CET (UTC+1)

6 March 2005 27	Pontevedra	2–2	Ciudad de Murcia	Pontevedra
CET (UTC+1)				Stadium: Estadio Municipal de Pasarón

13 March 2005 28	Pontevedra	1–3	Alavés	Pontevedra
CET (UTC+1)				Stadium: Estadio Municipal de Pasarón

20 March 2005 29	Terrassa	1–0	Pontevedra	Terrassa
CET (UTC+1)

27 March 2005 30	Pontevedra	2–1	Xerez	Pontevedra
CET (UTC+1)				Stadium: Estadio Municipal de Pasarón

3 April 2005 31	Eibar	1–2	Pontevedra	Eibar
CEST (UTC+2)

10 April 2005 32	Pontevedra	5–0	Lleida	Pontevedra
CEST (UTC+2)				Stadium: Estadio Municipal de Pasarón

16 April 2005 33	Almería	1–0	Pontevedra	Almería
CEST (UTC+2)

24 April 2005 34	Pontevedra	3–1	Gimnàstic	Pontevedra
CEST (UTC+2)				Stadium: Estadio Municipal de Pasarón

1 May 2005 35	Sporting Gijón	3–2	Pontevedra	Gijón
CEST (UTC+2)

8 May 2005 36	Pontevedra	0–0	Recreativo de Huelva	Pontevedra
CEST (UTC+2)				Stadium: Estadio Municipal de Pasarón

14 May 2005 37	Murcia	2–2	Pontevedra	Murcia
CEST (UTC+2)

22 May 2005 38	Pontevedra	3–1	Celta Vigo	Pontevedra
CEST (UTC+2)				Stadium: Estadio Municipal de Pasarón

29 May 2005 39	Racing Ferrol	1–2	Pontevedra	Ferrol
CEST (UTC+2)

4 June 2005 40	Pontevedra	1–1	Cádiz	Pontevedra
CEST (UTC+2)				Stadium: Estadio Municipal de Pasarón

12 June 2005 41	Málaga B	1–1	Pontevedra	Málaga
CEST (UTC+2)

18 June 2005 42	Pontevedra	4–1	Salamanca	Pontevedra
CEST (UTC+2)				Stadium: Estadio Municipal de Pasarón
