= Quebrada de Ullúm Dam =

Dam in Ullúm Department, Province of San Juan, Argentina

Ullúm Dam
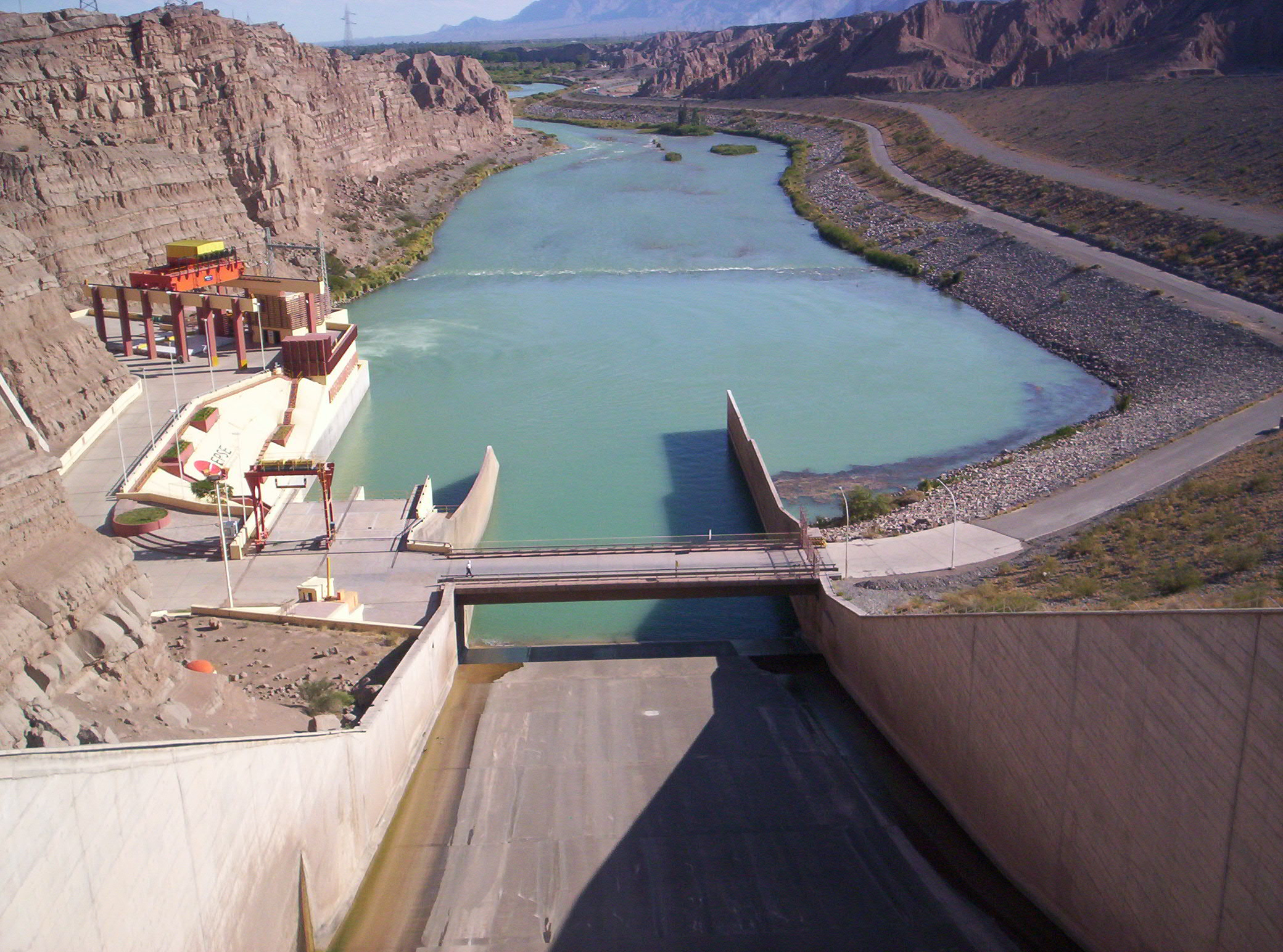
- Spillway and reservoir

- Location within Argentina
- Official name: Quebrada de Ullúm Dam
- Country: Argentina
- Location: San Juan, Ullúm Department, Province of San Juan
- Coordinates: 31°28′29.17″S 68°38′59.30″W
- Purpose: Power, water supply
- Status: Operational
- Construction began: 1969
- Opening date: 1980

Dam and spillways
- Type of dam: Embankment, earth and rock-fill
- Impounds: San Juan River
- Height: 53 m (174 ft)
- Length: 300 m (980 ft)

Reservoir
- Total capacity: 440,000,000 m^{3} (360,000 acre⋅ft)
- Surface area: 32 km^{2} (12 sq mi)

Power Station
- Commission date: 1981
- Turbines: 1 x 45 MW Kaplan-type
- Installed capacity: 45 MW

The Quebrada de Ullúm Dam, or simply Ullúm Dam, is an embankment dam on the San Juan River, just west of San Juan in Ullúm Department of the Province of San Juan, Argentina. It is located at the gorge of the Quebrada de Ullum, 18 kilometres (11 mi) upstream from the provincial capital San Juan, and creates a reservoir with an area of 32 square kilometres (12 sq mi), a volume of 440 million cubic metres (16×10^{9} cu ft), and average and maximum depths of 15 and 40 metres (49 and 131 ft), respectively. The reservoir feeds a hydroelectric power station with an installed power capacity of 45 megawatts (60,000 hp).

The region is arid, with mean annual rainfall below 85 millimetres (3.3 in), and is traversed by the rivers, San Juan and Jáchal. The dam is employed to regulate the flow to irrigate about 800 square kilometres (310 sq mi) of the Tulum Valley for agriculture, which is the basis of the economy of San Juan. It also allows for recreational and tourist activities.

Work on the dam began in 1969, and the facility was inaugurated on December 3, 1980.
