= Villa Ibáñez =

- Town and municipality
- Location of the locality in Argentina Villa Ibáñez (Argentina)
- Coordinates: 31°27′52″S 68°43′10″W
- Country: Argentina
- Province: San Juan
- Department: Ullúm
- Elevation: 763 m (2,503 ft)

Population (2010)
  - Total: 4,421
- Time zone: UTC−3 (ART)

Villa Ibáñez is a locality located in the south-central province of San Juan, west of the agricultural oasis of Ullúm, northwest of the city of San Juan, Argentina. It is the seat of the Ullúm Department. Today, the town is the nucleus of an important wine, fruit and olive region par excellence of the aforementioned province.

== Geography ==
=== Population ===
In the 2010 census, Villa Ibáñez had a population of 4,421.

=== Earthquakes ===
The seismicity of the Cuyo area (west central Argentina) is frequent and of low intensity, and a seismic silence of medium to severe earthquakes every 20 years in different random areas.

1977 San Juan earthquake

On 23 November 1977, the region was devastated by an earthquake, which left some unfortunate victims, and a significant percentage of material damage to buildings.

1861 Mendoza earthquake

Although this catastrophic geological activity has occurred since prehistoric times, the earthquake of 20 March 1861 marked an important milestone in the history of Argentine seismic events since it was the strongest recorded and documented in the country. Since then, the policies of successive Mendoza and municipal governments have been taking extreme care and restricting building codes.
