= Los Caracoles Dam =

Dam in San Juan, Argentina

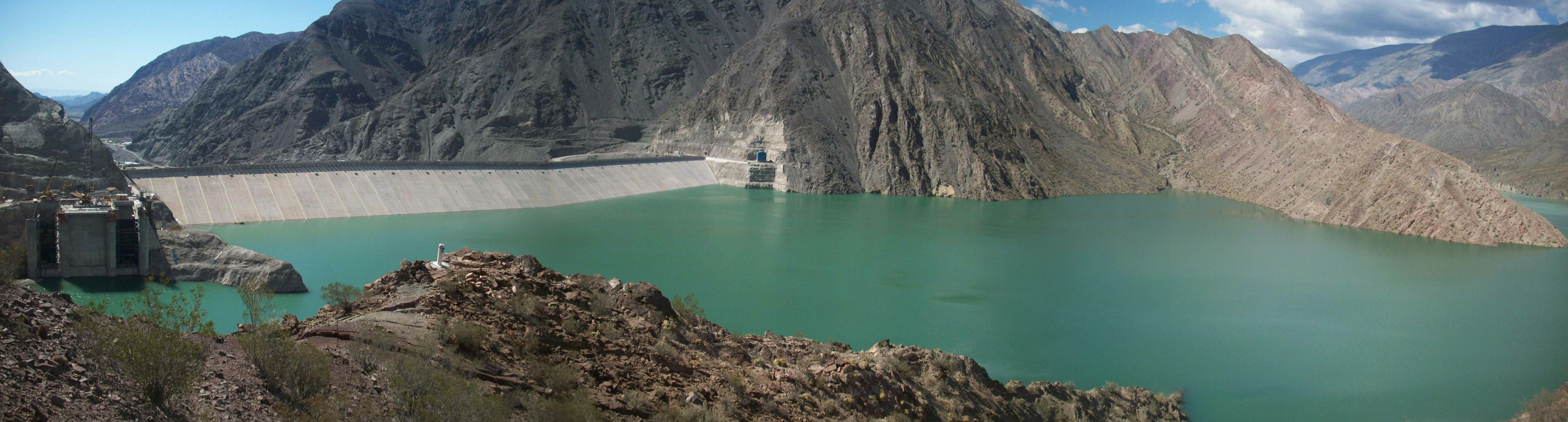
- Upstream face of the dam

- Location within Argentina
- Country: Argentina
- Location: San Juan, San Juan Province
- Coordinates: 31°31′8.60″S 68°58′54.39″W
- Purpose: Irrigation, power
- Status: Operational
- Construction began: 2004
- Opening date: 2009; 17 years ago
- Owner: Energia Provincial Sociedad del Estado SA

Dam and spillways
- Type of dam: Embankment, concrete-face rock-fill
- Impounds: San Juan River
- Height: 136 m (446 ft)
- Length: 605 m (1,985 ft)

Reservoir
- Total capacity: 565,000,000 m^{3} (458,000 acre⋅ft)
- Surface area: 13 km^{2} (5.0 sq mi)
- Maximum length: 13 km (8.1 mi)

Power Station
- Commission date: 2009
- Hydraulic head: 150 m (490 ft)
- Turbines: 2 x 63 MW (84,000 hp) Francis-type
- Installed capacity: 126 MW (169,000 hp)

The Lost Caracoles Dam, or Caracoles Dam is a concrete-face rock-fill dam on the San Juan River about 44 kilometres (27 mi) west of San Juan in San Juan Province, Argentina. The purpose of the dam is to provide water for irrigation and the generation of hydroelectric power. The 136-metre (446 ft) tall dam supports a 126 megawatts (169,000 hp) power station and together with the Punta Negra Dam downstream, it provides for the irrigation of 15,000 hectares (37,000 acres). Construction began in 2004 and the dam and power station were completed in 2009.
