= Mogna =

Town in San Juan, Argentina

- Town
- Location within San Juan Province Location within Argentina
- Coordinates: 30°41′39″S 68°21′22″W
- Country: Argentina
- Province: San Juan
- Department: Jáchal

Government
  - Mayor: Miguel Ángel Vega
- Elevation: 734 m (2,408 ft)

Population (2010)
  - Total: 114

Language
  - Official: Spanish
- Time zone: UTC−3 (ART)
- Postal code: J5460
- Area code: 02647

Mogna is a town in the Jáchal Department, San Juan Province, Argentina. It is located on the right bank of the Jáchal River, at an altitude of 734 meters above the sea level. In the year 2010, the town had a total population of 114.

== Climate ==
Mogna has a Hot Desert Climate (BWh). It sees the least amount of precipitation in June and July, with 7 mm of average rainfall; and the most precipitation in January, with 52 mm of average rainfall.

Climate data for Mogna
Month	Jan	Feb	Mar	Apr	May	Jun	Jul	Aug	Sep	Oct	Nov	Dec	Year
Mean daily maximum °C (°F)	32.4 (90.3)	31.2 (88.2)	28.2 (82.8)	24.2 (75.6)	19.9 (67.8)	18.0 (64.4)	17.1 (62.8)	20.6 (69.1)	23.5 (74.3)	27.2 (81.0)	30.2 (86.4)	32.0 (89.6)	25.4 (77.7)
Daily mean °C (°F)	26.2 (79.2)	25.0 (77.0)	22.1 (71.8)	18.1 (64.6)	13.5 (56.3)	10.6 (51.1)	9.6 (49.3)	12.5 (54.5)	15.7 (60.3)	19.8 (67.6)	23.1 (73.6)	25.3 (77.5)	18.5 (65.2)
Mean daily minimum °C (°F)	20.2 (68.4)	19.2 (66.6)	16.6 (61.9)	12.6 (54.7)	7.8 (46.0)	4.1 (39.4)	2.8 (37.0)	5.0 (41.0)	8.1 (46.6)	12.7 (54.9)	16.0 (60.8)	18.7 (65.7)	12.0 (53.6)
Average rainfall mm (inches)	52 (2.0)	48 (1.9)	38 (1.5)	21 (0.8)	12 (0.5)	7 (0.3)	7 (0.3)	9 (0.4)	15 (0.6)	18 (0.7)	25 (1.0)	42 (1.7)	294 (11.7)
Source: Climate-Data.org

== Environmental issue ==
As a result of mining, the water of the Jáchal River has been contaminated with several metal minerals like Arsenic, Mercury and Magnesium, as well as spills from mining companies.
