= Desaguadero River (Argentina) =

River in Argentina

Coordinates: 38°49′08″S 64°59′09″W

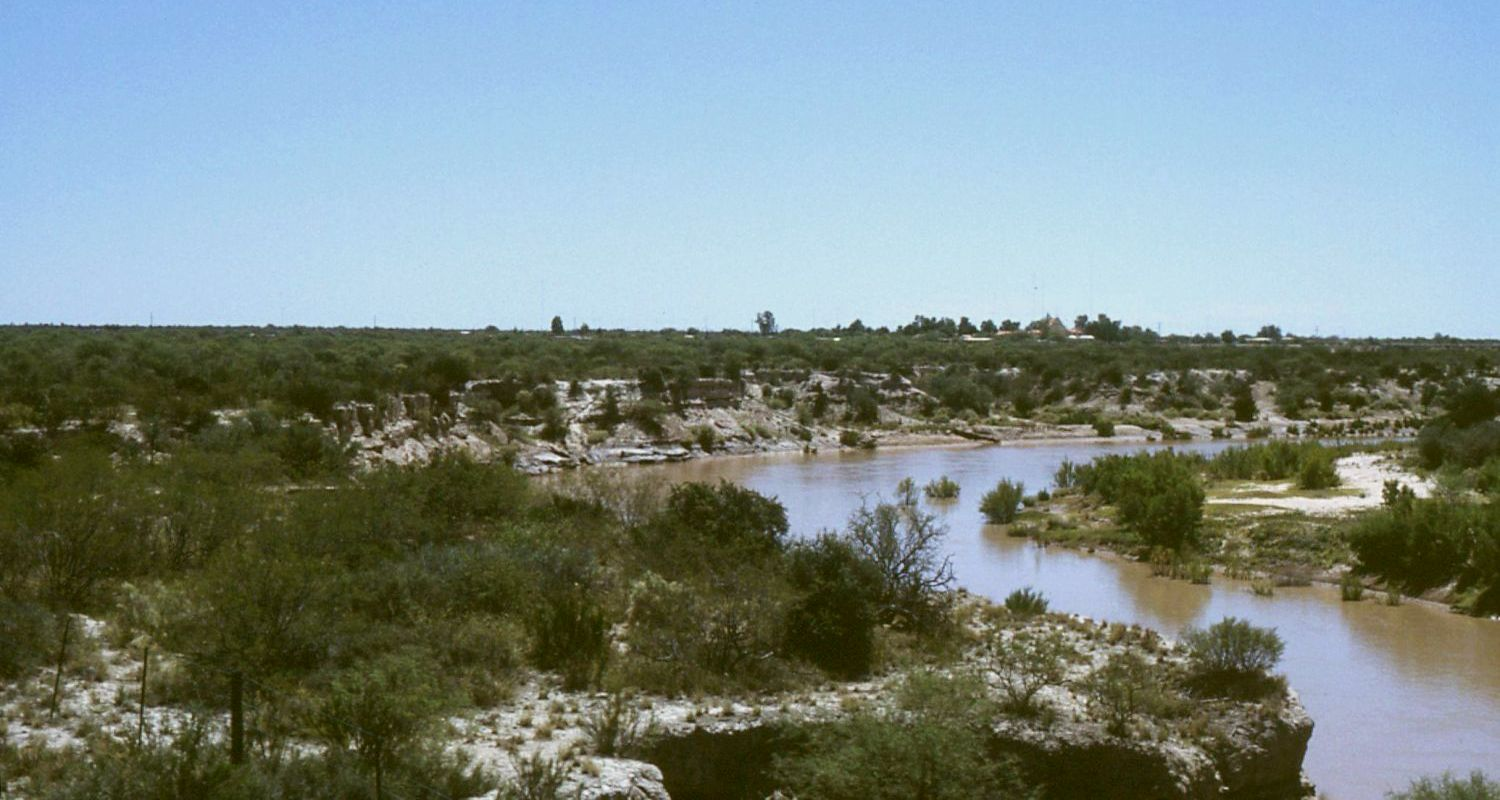
The river near the town of Desaguadero, eastern Mendoza

The Desaguadero River (Spanish: Río Desaguadero, Spanish pronunciation: [ˈri.o ðesaɣwaˈðeɾo]) is a river in Argentina. Originating near the Tipas volcano in La Rioja at about 5,500 m (18,000 ft) elevation, the river is known in its upper reaches as the Bermejo or Vinchina. In its lower reaches, it is also known as the Salado. It joins the Colorado River in La Pampa Province near Pichi Mahuida. The Desaguadero has a total length of 1,498 km (931 mi) and its drainage basin is about 260,000 km^{2} (100,000 sq mi).

It is one of the major rivers that supplies the irrigated areas of Cuyo, and it flows in the eastern border of that region. Due to use of its waters for irrigation, the river is a small, shallow stream for most of the year despite its great length, and only occasionally does surface flow reach the Colorado.

Tributaries include the Jáchal, San Juan, Tunuyán, Diamante and Atuel Rivers.

== History ==
The river marked the traditional boundary between the vice-royalties of Buenos Aires and Peru.

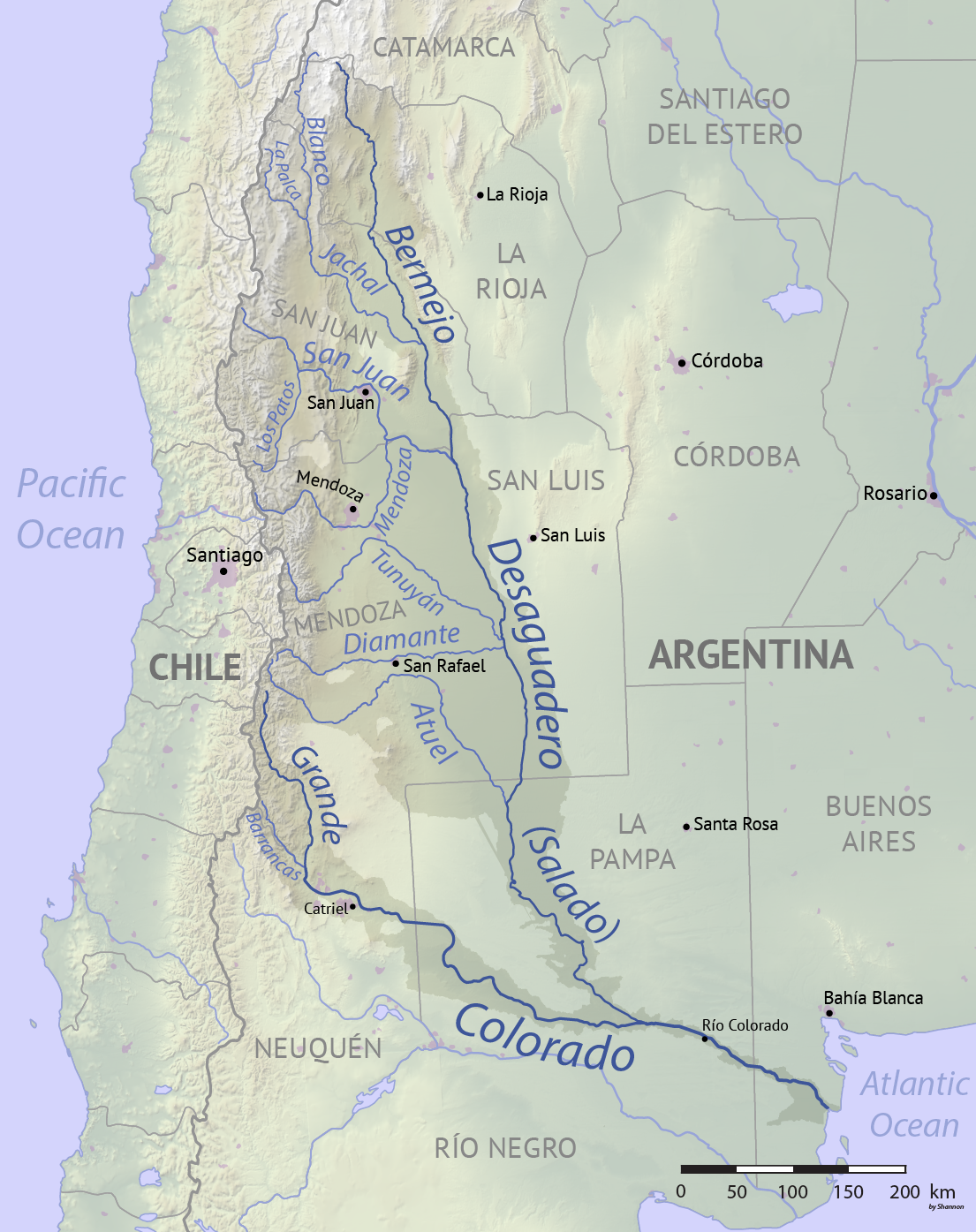
Map of the Colorado River–Desaguadero River drainage basin
