= Punta Negra Dam =

Dam in San Juan, Argentina

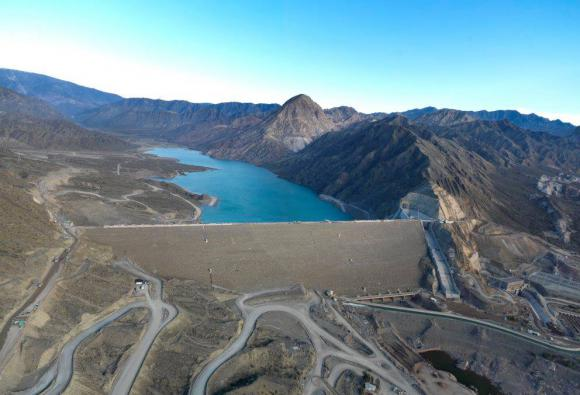

- Location within Argentina
- Country: Argentina
- Location: San Juan, San Juan Province
- Coordinates: 31°31′9.16″S 68°49′4.10″W
- Purpose: Irrigation, power
- Status: Operational
- Construction began: 2009
- Opening date: August 29, 2015
- Owner: Energia Provincial Sociedad del Estado SA

Dam and spillways
- Type of dam: Embankment, concrete-face rock-fill
- Impounds: San Juan River
- Height: 101 m (331 ft)
- Length: 700 m (2,300 ft)

Reservoir
- Total capacity: 500,000,000 m^{3} (410,000 acre⋅ft)
- Surface area: 12.5 km^{2} (4.8 sq mi)
- Maximum length: 13 km (8.1 mi)

Power Station
- Commission date: 2016 (est.)
- Hydraulic head: 86 m (282 ft)
- Turbines: 2 x 31 MW (42,000 hp) Francis-type
- Installed capacity: 62 MW (83,000 hp)

The Punta Negra Dam is a concrete-face rock-fill dam on the San Juan River about 28 kilometres (17 mi) west of San Juan in San Juan Province, Argentina. The purpose of the dam is to provide water for irrigation and the generation of hydroelectric power. The 101 metres (331 ft) tall dam supports a 62-megawatt (83,000 hp) power station and together with the Los Caracoles Dam upstream, it will provide for the irrigation of 15,000 hectares (37,000 acres). Construction began in 2009 and the dam and was finished on August 29, 2015. It is being constructed immediately upstream of a diversion barrage.
