= Rodeo, San Juan =

Locality in Argentina

Rodeo
- Locality
- Location within San Juan Province Location within Argentina
- Coordinates: 30°12′59″S 69°08′22″W
- Country: Argentina
- Province: San Juan
- Department: Iglesia
- Elevation: 1,557 m (5,108 ft)

Population (2010)
  - Total: 2,625
- Time zone: UTC−3 (ART)

Rodeo (also known as Rodeo - Colola) is a locality and the head town of the Iglesia Department, located in the northwest of the San Juan Province, Argentina. It is a town that has experienced significant tourist growth, with the presence of an important accommodation infrastructure, being one of the main attractions of the San Juan Province.

Its main communication route is the RN 150, a route that would make it a component locality of the future bioceanic corridor, after the construction of a tunnel in the Agua Negra Pass, connecting it with the extreme northeast of the province, the center of the country. and the ports of Coquimbo in Chile and Porto Alegre in Brazil.

== Climate ==
Rodeo has a cold desert climate (BWk, under the Köppen climate classification).

The average annual temperature is 15.7 °C; the warmest month is January with 23 °C and the coldest is July with 7.9 °C. The average annual maximum and minimum temperatures are 23.2 °C and 5.1 °C respectively.

The average annual rainfall is 52 mm; of which 80% (43.8 mm) corresponds to the December-March period, the remaining 20% (8.2 mm) is rainfall that occurs in the April-November period. The average annual frequency of days with precipitation is only 11, in the months of December-March the average monthly frequency is 2 to 3, while in the rest of the year it is practically zero.

Climate data for Rodeo (San Juan), Argentina (1969–1994)
Month	Jan	Feb	Mar	Apr	May	Jun	Jul	Aug	Sep	Oct	Nov	Dec	Year
Record high °C (°F)	35.5 (95.9)	34.5 (94.1)	33.3 (91.9)	32.5 (90.5)	31.4 (88.5)	29.0 (84.2)	29.0 (84.2)	30.5 (86.9)	34.6 (94.3)	34.5 (94.1)	35.8 (96.4)	36.0 (96.8)	36.0 (96.8)
Mean daily maximum °C (°F)	27.6 (81.7)	26.9 (80.4)	25.3 (77.5)	23.1 (73.6)	21.9 (71.4)	16.8 (62.2)	17.4 (63.3)	19.3 (66.7)	21.0 (69.8)	24.7 (76.5)	26.0 (78.8)	27.9 (82.2)	23.2 (73.8)
Daily mean °C (°F)	23.0 (73.4)	21.8 (71.2)	17.9 (64.2)	14.2 (57.6)	12.1 (53.8)	8.0 (46.4)	7.9 (46.2)	9.8 (49.6)	13.7 (56.7)	17.2 (63.0)	19.9 (67.8)	22.7 (72.9)	15.7 (60.3)
Mean daily minimum °C (°F)	11.1 (52.0)	10.1 (50.2)	6.9 (44.4)	4.5 (40.1)	1.6 (34.9)	−1.7 (28.9)	−1.6 (29.1)	0.0 (32.0)	2.5 (36.5)	6.5 (43.7)	9.1 (48.4)	12.1 (53.8)	5.1 (41.2)
Record low °C (°F)	1.0 (33.8)	1.1 (34.0)	−2.0 (28.4)	−5.0 (23.0)	−9.4 (15.1)	−14.0 (6.8)	−12.4 (9.7)	−13.0 (8.6)	−10.0 (14.0)	−6.5 (20.3)	−1.0 (30.2)	0.1 (32.2)	−14.0 (6.8)
Average precipitation mm (inches)	15.0 (0.59)	17.6 (0.69)	4.0 (0.16)	0.9 (0.04)	0.4 (0.02)	0.1 (0.00)	1.5 (0.06)	1.2 (0.05)	0.2 (0.01)	2.8 (0.11)	1.0 (0.04)	7.2 (0.28)	52.0 (2.05)
Average precipitation days	2.0	3.0	1.0	0.0	0.0	0.0	1.0	0.0	0.0	0.0	0.0	2.0	11.0
Average relative humidity (%)	38.0	41.0	35.0	38.0	47.0	49.0	44.0	40.0	43.0	46.0	43.0	44.0	42
Average dew point °C (°F)	10.9 (51.6)	10.4 (50.7)	7.3 (45.1)	3.9 (39.0)	−0.6 (30.9)	−3.7 (25.3)	−3.6 (25.5)	−2.6 (27.3)	−0.9 (30.4)	2.9 (37.2)	5.6 (42.1)	9.1 (48.4)	3.2 (37.8)
Source: Secretaria de Mineria
