= Sierra del Tontal =

Mountain range in Argentina

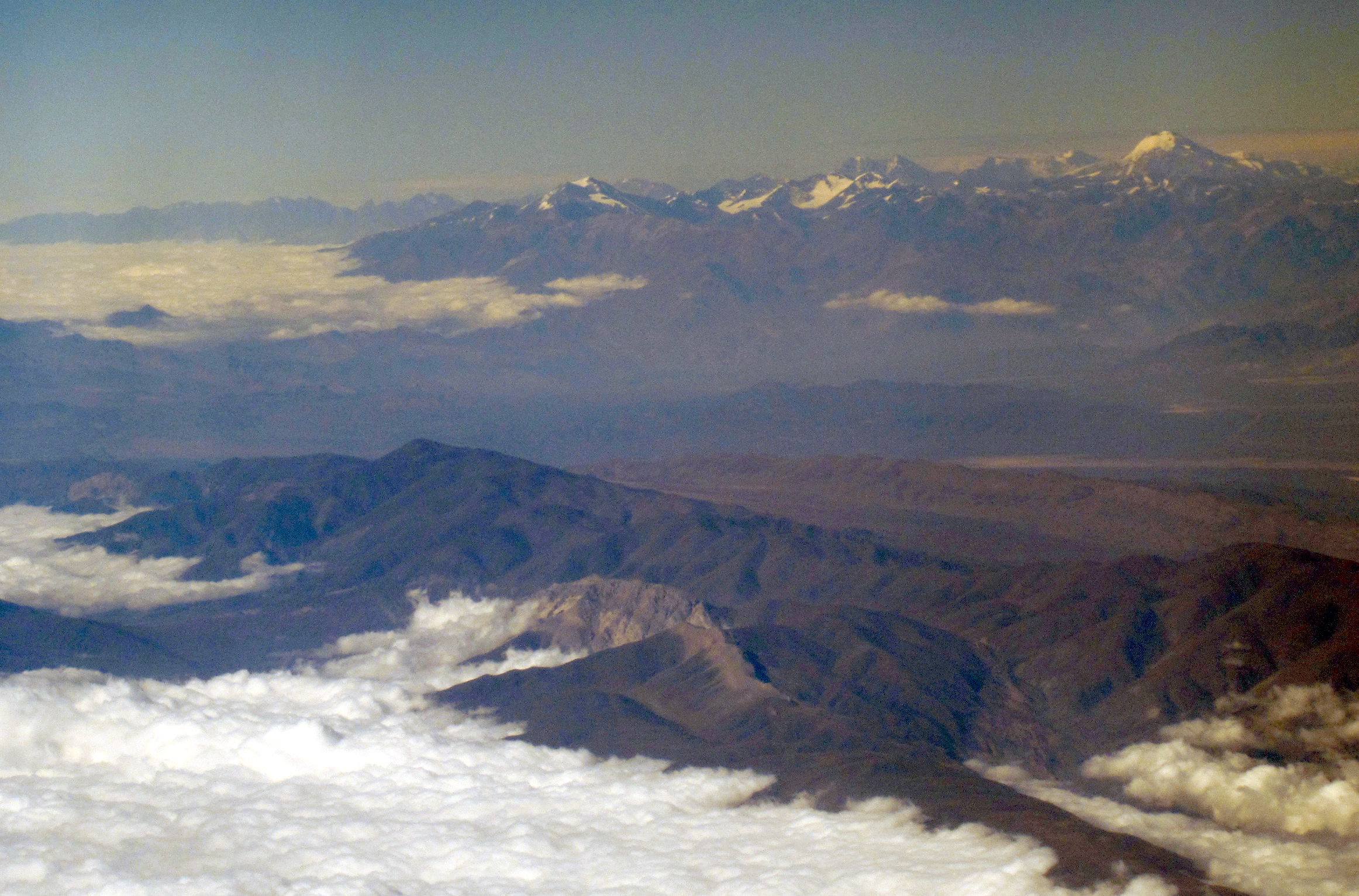

Highest point
- Elevation: 4,140 m (13,580 ft)
- Coordinates: 31°32′S 69°11′W

Geography
- Location within Argentina
- Country: Argentina

The Sierra del Tontal is a mountain range in the southern part of San Juan Province, Argentina.

The range is in the precordillera area of La Rioja, San Juan and Mendoza, in the Cuyo region. It extends south of the Sierra del Tigre, from which it is separated by the valley of the San Juan River. Its southern foothills are located in Mendoza Province. The city of San Juan is located east of the mountains and the Calingasta valley to the west.

The range extends for about 100 kilometres (62 mi) in a northwest–southeast direction. The highest point is the Ojo de Agua mountain at 4,140 metres (13,580 ft). Most of the range extends to the south of this peak, and is over 4,000 metres (13,000 ft) in elevation.

The rocks include greywackes and shales. The fossil remains of plants that probably date to the middle or upper Devonian period are found in the shales.
