= Colorado River (Argentina) =

River in Argentina

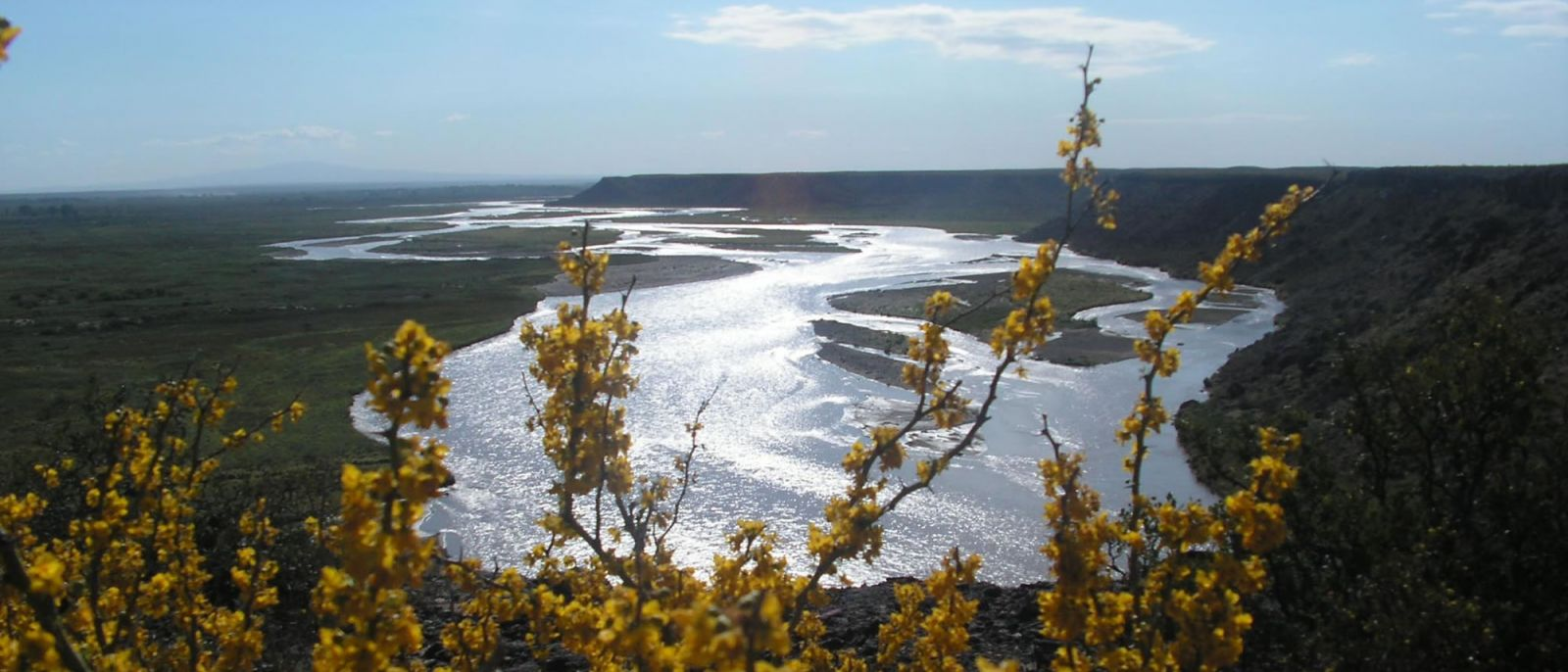
- Lower part of Colorado River

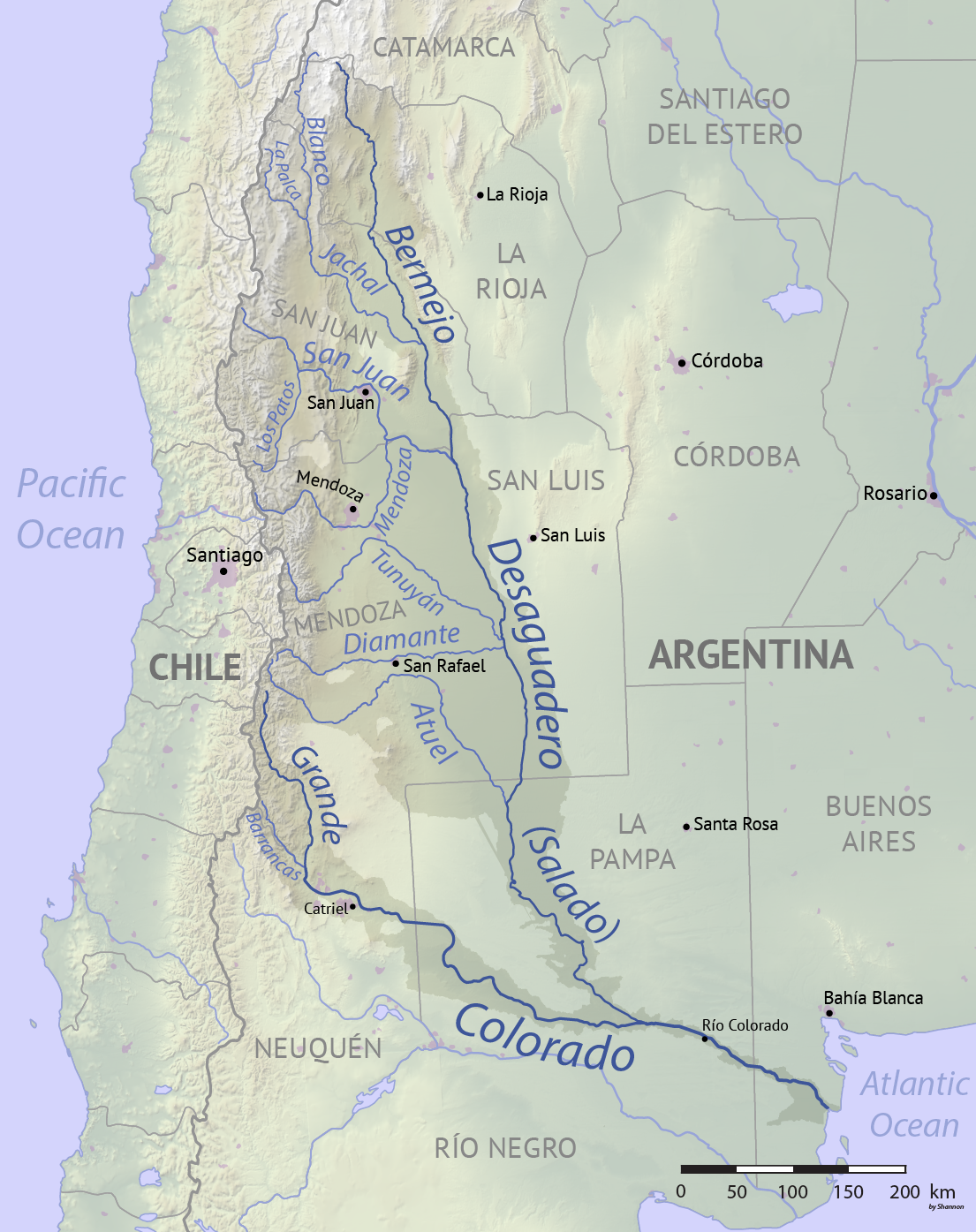
- Map of the Colorado River–Río Desaguadero (or Salado River) drainage basin

Location
- Country: Argentina

Physical characteristics
- Source: Andes
  - location: Eastern Andes Slope, Argentina
  - coordinates: 36°09′02″S 70°23′47″W
  - elevation: 2,186 m (7,172 ft)
- Mouth: Atlantic Ocean
  - location: Argentina
  - coordinates: 39°42′54.39″S 62°7′52.43″W
  - elevation: 0 m (0 ft)
- Length: 1,114 km (692 mi)
- Basin size: 294,076 km^{2} (113,543 sq mi)
- Discharge
  - average: 130 m^{3}/s (4,600 cu ft/s)

Basin features
- Tributaries
  - left: Río Desaguadero

The Colorado River (Spanish: Río Colorado, Spanish pronunciation: [ˈri.o koloˈɾaðo]) is a river in the center of Argentina.

The Colorado River marks most of the political boundary between the Argentine provinces of Neuquén and Mendoza, and between Rio Negro and La Pampa. Its man-made dam, "Embalse Casa de Piedra," serves both to generate hydroelectricity for the arid region the river traverses, and to regulate the river's water level.

== Course ==
Its sources are on the eastern slopes of the Andes in the same latitude as the Chilean volcano Tinguiririca (about 34° 48' S.) and the river takes a generally east-southeast course toward the Atlantic Ocean. After leaving the vicinity of the Andes, the Colorado flows through a barren, arid territory, and receives no tributary of note except the Salado (or Curacó) from La Pampa Province—although it was once an outlet of the now-closed lake basin of Laguna Urre Lauquen. The bottom lands of the Colorado, in its course across Patagonia, are fertile and wooded, but too small in area to support more than a small, scattered population. The river ends about 100 to 120 kilometres (62 to 75 mi) south of Bahía Blanca, through several channels of a delta of the Unión Bay extending from latitude 39° 30' to 39° 50' S. Its total length is about 1,000 kilometres (620 mi), of which about 300 kilometres (190 mi), from the coast up to Pichi Mahuida, are navigable for vessels of up to 2 metres (7 ft) draft. It is nearly 2,000 kilometres (1,200 mi) if calculated Río Desaguadero within.

== Naming ==
The river has usually been described as formed by the confluence of the Grande and the Barrancas rivers. However, since the Barrancas is only a small stream compared to the Grande, it is more accurate to describe the Barrancas as a tributary that joins the main river, which is known as the "Grande" above where the Barrancas joins it, and the "Colorado" below that point.
