= San José de Jáchal =

- City
- Location of San José de Jáchal in Argentina
- Coordinates: 30°14′S 68°45′W
- Country: Argentina
- Province: San Juan
- Department: Jáchal

Population (2001 census)
  - Total: 21,018
- Time zone: UTC−3 (ART)
- CPA base: J5460
- Dialing code: +54 2647

San José de Jáchal (Spanish pronunciation: [saŋ xoˈse ðe ˈxatʃal], often shortened to Jáchal) is a city in the northeast of the province of San Juan, Argentina, located on National Route 40, south of the Jáchal River. It has 21,018 inhabitants per the 2001 census [INDEC], and is the head town of the Jáchal Department.

== History ==
San José de Jáchal was founded on 25 June 1751 by the field master Juan de Echegaray, by the order of the Board of Populations of the Kingdom of Chile. That same month, through an interesting ceremony, the Villa de San José de Jáchal, forty leagues north of San Juan de la Frontera, was born to civilian and political life.

== Geography ==
=== Climate ===
Climate data for San José de Jáchal (1991–2020, extremes 1961–present)
Month	Jan	Feb	Mar	Apr	May	Jun	Jul	Aug	Sep	Oct	Nov	Dec	Year
Record high °C (°F)	42.7 (108.9)	41.5 (106.7)	39.6 (103.3)	38.3 (100.9)	36.2 (97.2)	35.5 (95.9)	35.5 (95.9)	36.5 (97.7)	39.1 (102.4)	39.9 (103.8)	43.0 (109.4)	45.3 (113.5)	45.3 (113.5)
Mean daily maximum °C (°F)	32.9 (91.2)	31.2 (88.2)	29.0 (84.2)	24.5 (76.1)	20.5 (68.9)	18.5 (65.3)	17.6 (63.7)	20.4 (68.7)	22.8 (73.0)	26.9 (80.4)	30.3 (86.5)	32.7 (90.9)	25.6 (78.1)
Daily mean °C (°F)	25.4 (77.7)	23.3 (73.9)	21.0 (69.8)	16.0 (60.8)	11.2 (52.2)	8.4 (47.1)	7.2 (45.0)	10.0 (50.0)	13.5 (56.3)	18.3 (64.9)	22.0 (71.6)	24.9 (76.8)	16.8 (62.2)
Mean daily minimum °C (°F)	16.6 (61.9)	15.1 (59.2)	13.0 (55.4)	7.2 (45.0)	2.6 (36.7)	−1.0 (30.2)	−2.4 (27.7)	−0.6 (30.9)	3.3 (37.9)	7.8 (46.0)	11.8 (53.2)	15.2 (59.4)	7.4 (45.3)
Record low °C (°F)	3.9 (39.0)	3.5 (38.3)	−1.2 (29.8)	−3.3 (26.1)	−8.1 (17.4)	−11.0 (12.2)	−12.4 (9.7)	−11.3 (11.7)	−7.4 (18.7)	−5.6 (21.9)	−3.8 (25.2)	0.0 (32.0)	−12.4 (9.7)
Average precipitation mm (inches)	18.6 (0.73)	32.3 (1.27)	16.0 (0.63)	8.2 (0.32)	5.7 (0.22)	3.2 (0.13)	3.4 (0.13)	1.8 (0.07)	5.4 (0.21)	4.8 (0.19)	5.9 (0.23)	18.1 (0.71)	123.4 (4.86)
Average precipitation days (≥ 0.1 mm)	4.5	4.8	3.7	2.6	2.0	1.2	1.2	1.3	1.5	1.5	1.2	2.9	28.5
Average snowy days	0.0	0.0	0.0	0.1	0.1	0.1	0.6	0.4	0.3	0.0	0.0	0.0	1.6
Average relative humidity (%)	53.4	58.1	62.0	64.9	66.2	63.4	61.7	56.0	54.4	50.6	48.2	49.1	57.3
Mean monthly sunshine hours	285.2	240.1	220.1	192.0	179.8	174.0	195.3	226.3	225.0	269.7	294.0	306.9	2,808.4
Mean daily sunshine hours	9.2	8.5	7.1	6.4	5.8	5.8	6.3	7.3	7.5	8.7	9.8	9.9	7.7
Percentage possible sunshine	69	69	63	67	61	53	61	68	63	68	66	66	65
Source 1: Servicio Meteorológico Nacional
Source 2: UNLP (percent sun 1971–1980)
