= César Garipe =

Argentine footballer

Personal information
- Full name: César Daniel Garipe
- Date of birth: 7 May 1981 (age 45)
- Place of birth: San Juan, Argentina
- Position: Midfielder

Senior career*
Years	Team	Apps	(Gls)
1997–1998	Juventud Alianza	0	(0)
1998–2003	Huracán	105	(5)
2003	Lanús	2	(0)
2004	Argentinos Juniors	15	(0)
2004	Pontevedra	16	(0)
2005	Godoy Cruz		
2006–2007	Juventud Alianza		
2008	Godoy Cruz		
2009–2010	Independiente Rivadavia	32	(0)
2010	Everton	11	(0)
2011	Juventud Alianza		
2011–2012	Huracán Las Heras	27	(3)
2012	Juventud Alianza		
2013	Gimnasia y Esgrima	21	(1)
2013–2014	Juventud Alianza		
2014	Centro Empleados de Comercio	7	(1)
2015–2019	Juventud Alianza		

International career
2000	Argentina U20	1	(0)
- * Club domestic league appearances and goals

César Daniel Garipe (born 7 May 1981 in San Juan, Argentina) is an Argentine former professional footballer who played as a midfielder.

Born in San Juan, Argentina, Garipe began playing club football with Juventud Alianza. At age 18, he joined Club Atlético Huracán and made an appearance for the Argentina national under-20 football team against England at Wembley Stadium in February 2000. In 2005, Garipe signed for MetroStars of MLS.
