= Pichi Mahuida =

Coordinates: 38°49′53″S 64°56′05″W

- Municipality and village
- Interactive map of Pichi Mahuida
- Country: Argentina
- Province: Río Negro Province
- Time zone: UTC−3 (ART)

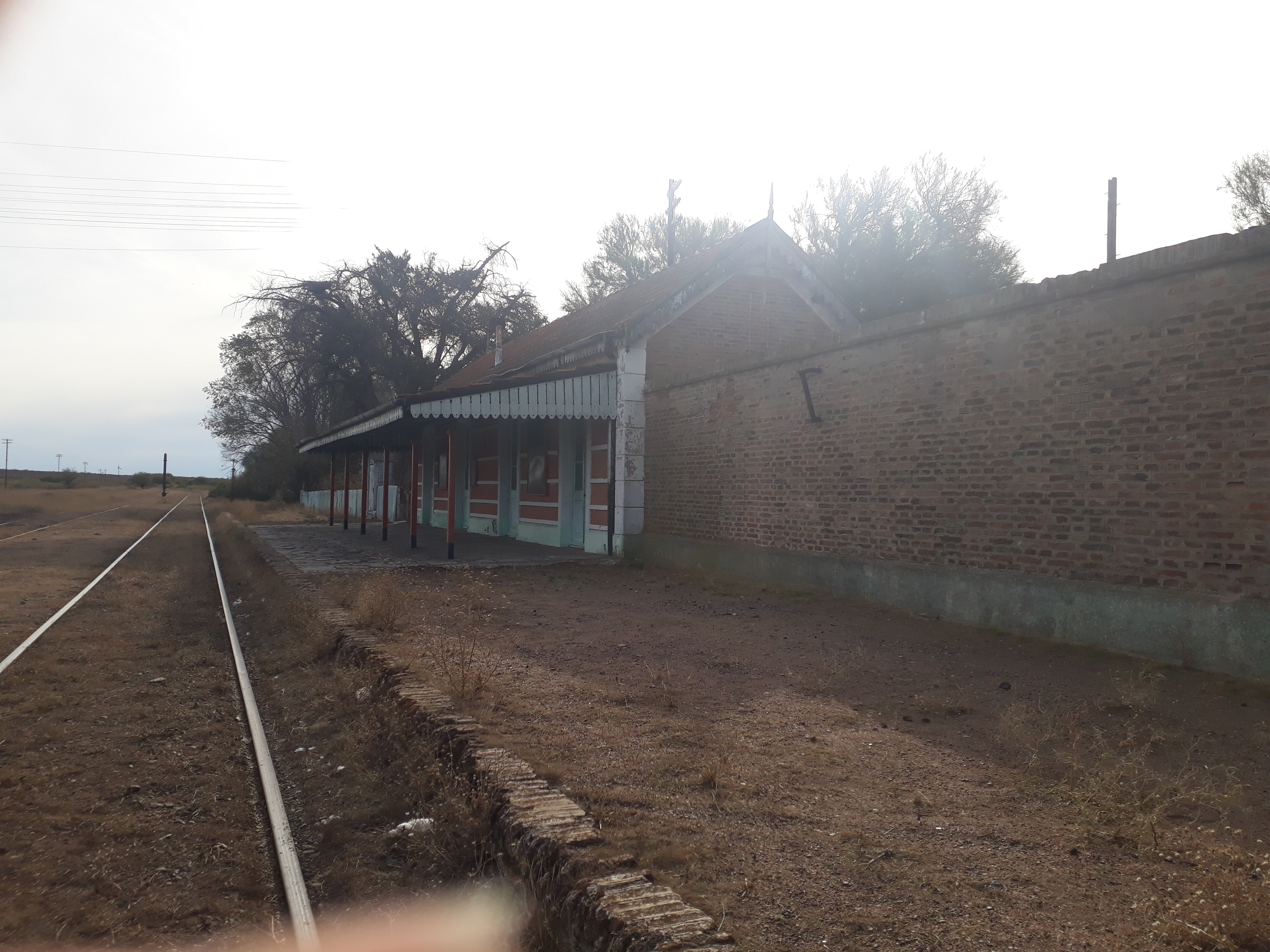
Train station in Pichi Mahuida

Pichi Mahuida is a village and municipality in Río Negro Province in Argentina.
