= San Juan River (Argentina) =

Coordinates: 31°15′15″S 69°13′00″W

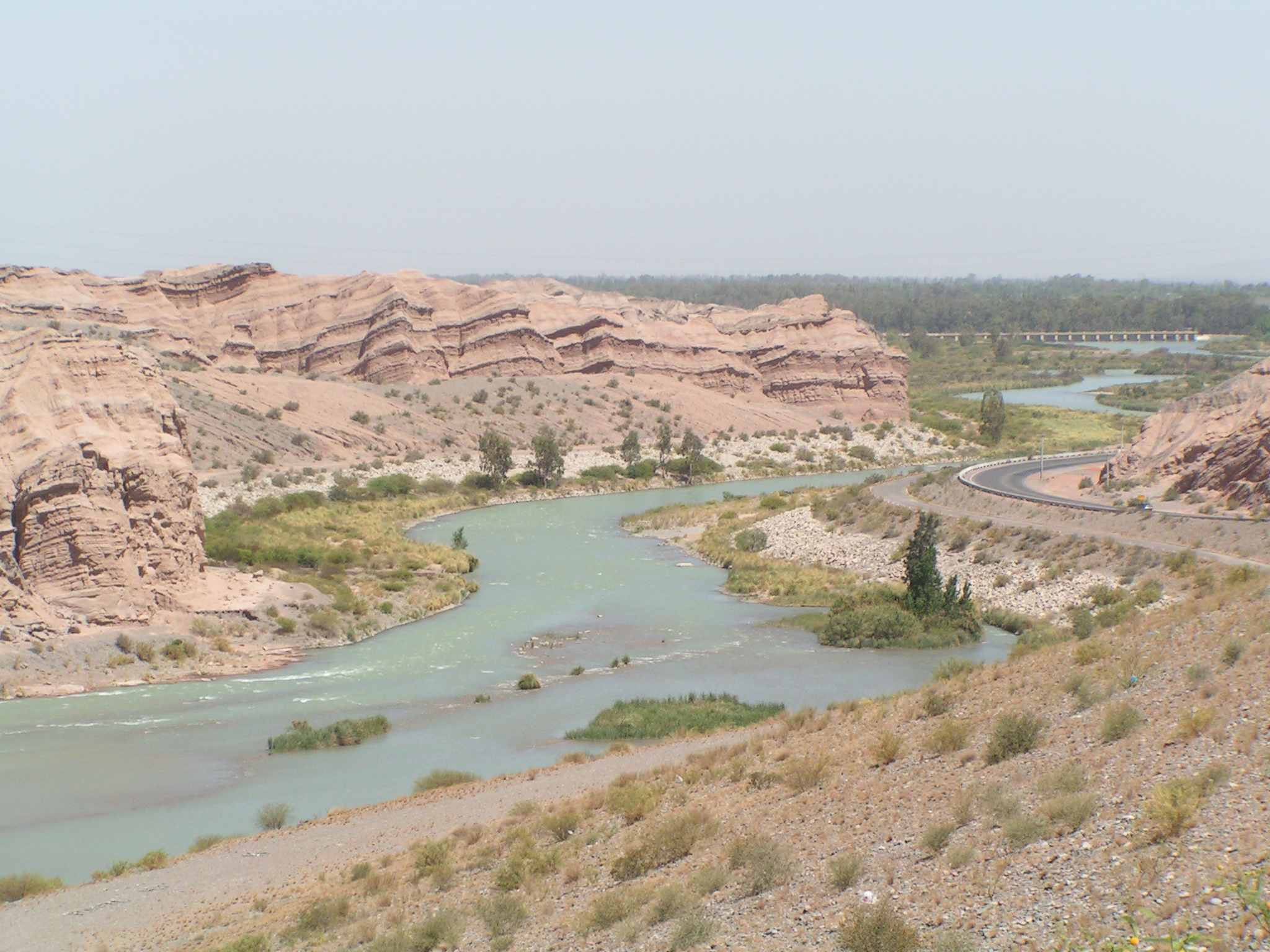
- The San Juan River

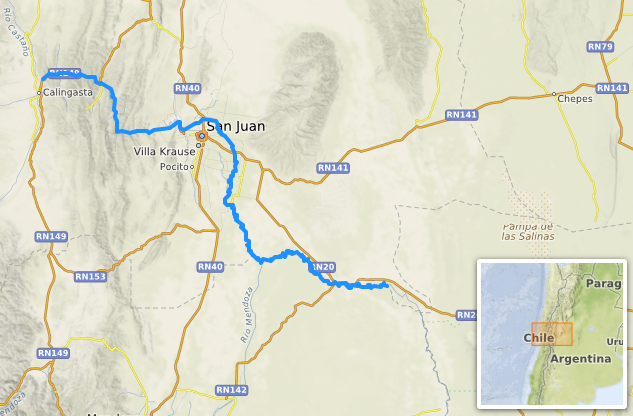
- Path of the Rio San Juan

Location
- Country: Argentina
- Province: San Juan

Physical characteristics
- Source
  - location: Confluence of the Calingasta, Castaño Viejo, and los Patos rivers
- Mouth
  - location: Desaguadero River
- Length: 500 km (310 mi)
- Basin size: 39,906 km^{2} (15,408 sq mi)
- Discharge
  - average: 56 m^{3}/s (2,000 cu ft/s)

Basin features
- Progression: Desaguadero River; Atlantic Ocean

The San Juan River is, together with the Jáchal, an important river in Argentina's San Juan province. Both join the Desaguadero/Colorado system that ends at the Atlantic Ocean.

== Course ==
The river starts near the town of Calingasta, in the southwest of the province, from the confluence of three main rivers: the Calingasta River, the Castaño Viejo River, and the Río de los Patos. These rivers are born at an altitude of about 4,000 metres (13,000 ft) above mean sea level in the west and southwest of the province (in contrast, the Jáchal receives its Andean tributaries from the north of the province).

From Calingasta the river flows eastwards feeding the Los Caracoles, Punta Negra and Quebrada de Ullum Dams (Embalse Quebrada de Ullum) located near San Juan city, from which it continues south-eastwards receiving a few more tributaries, including the Mendoza River, to later join the Desaguadero River near the Salina Pampa de las Latas (or Salina Bermejo), at the common border of the provinces of San Juan, Mendoza and San Luis.

The river has an average flow of 60 cubic metres per second (2,100 cu ft/s). Its course is 500 kilometres (310 mi) long, and its drainage basin covers an area of 39,906 square kilometres (15,408 sq mi). The Ullum Dam is 768 metres (2,520 ft) AMSL with a reservoir covering an area of 32 square kilometres (12 sq mi) and a volume of around 440×10^{6} cubic metres (1.6×10^{10} cu ft).

The upper course of the river is used for water sports such as rafting, fishing, and windsurfing. Along its entire length, the San Juan River is heavily used for irrigation.
