= Iglesia Department =

Iglesia Departamento Iglesia
- Department
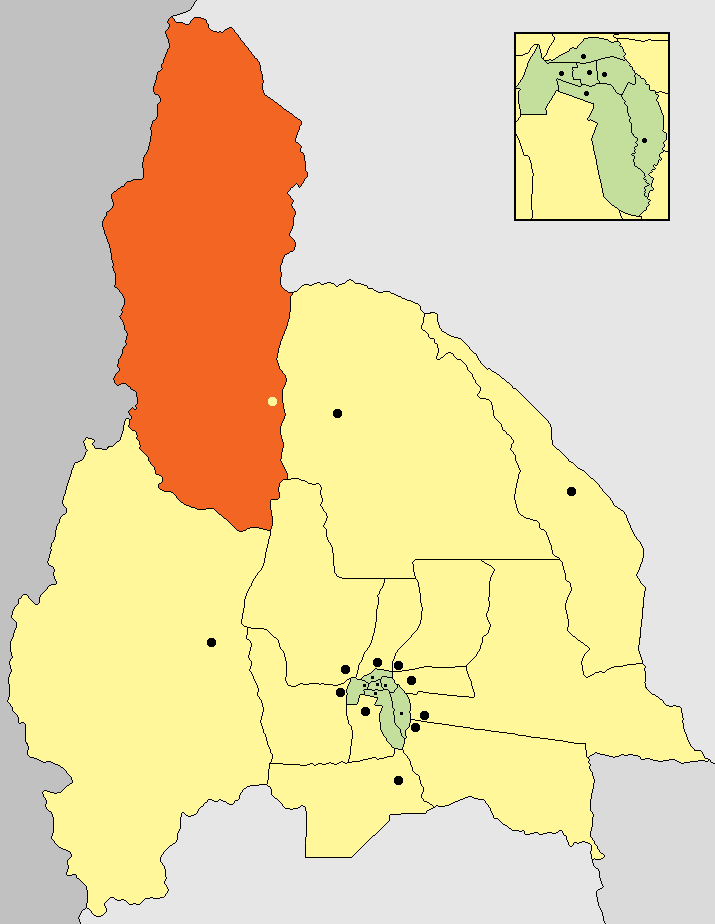
- location of Departamento Iglesia in San Juan Province
- Coordinates: 30°11′S 69°09′W
- Country: Argentina
- Established: November 15, 1851
- Seat: Rodeo

Government
  - Intendant: Jorge Espejo

Area
  - Total: 19,801 km^{2} (7,645 sq mi)

Population (2001 census [INDEC])
  - Total: 6,737
  - Density: 0.3402/km^{2} (0.8812/sq mi)
- Demonym: iglesiano/a
- Postal Code: 5400
- IFAM: SJU006
- Area Code: 0264

Iglesia is a department of the province of San Juan, Argentina. It is located in the northwest mountainous corner of this province with substantial vegetation. Iglesia is one of the most visited departments in the province, particularly around Rodeo.

== Economy ==
Nearly 30 percent of the cultivated area is dedicated to logging. Next in land area are pasture and seeds (garlic, beans, lettuce, onions, peas). Fruit, cereals, vegetables and aromatics are minor crops. Local farmers breed goats and sheep on the grassland.

Significant gold and silver mining occupy the Cordillera iglesiana, including the Veladero mine, which began production in 2005. Located 375 kilometers from the city of San Juan, the project is run by Minera Argentina Gold (MAGSA), a subsidiary of Barrick Gold.
