= Jáchal River =

River in Argentina

Coordinates: 30°13′12″S 68°45′22″W

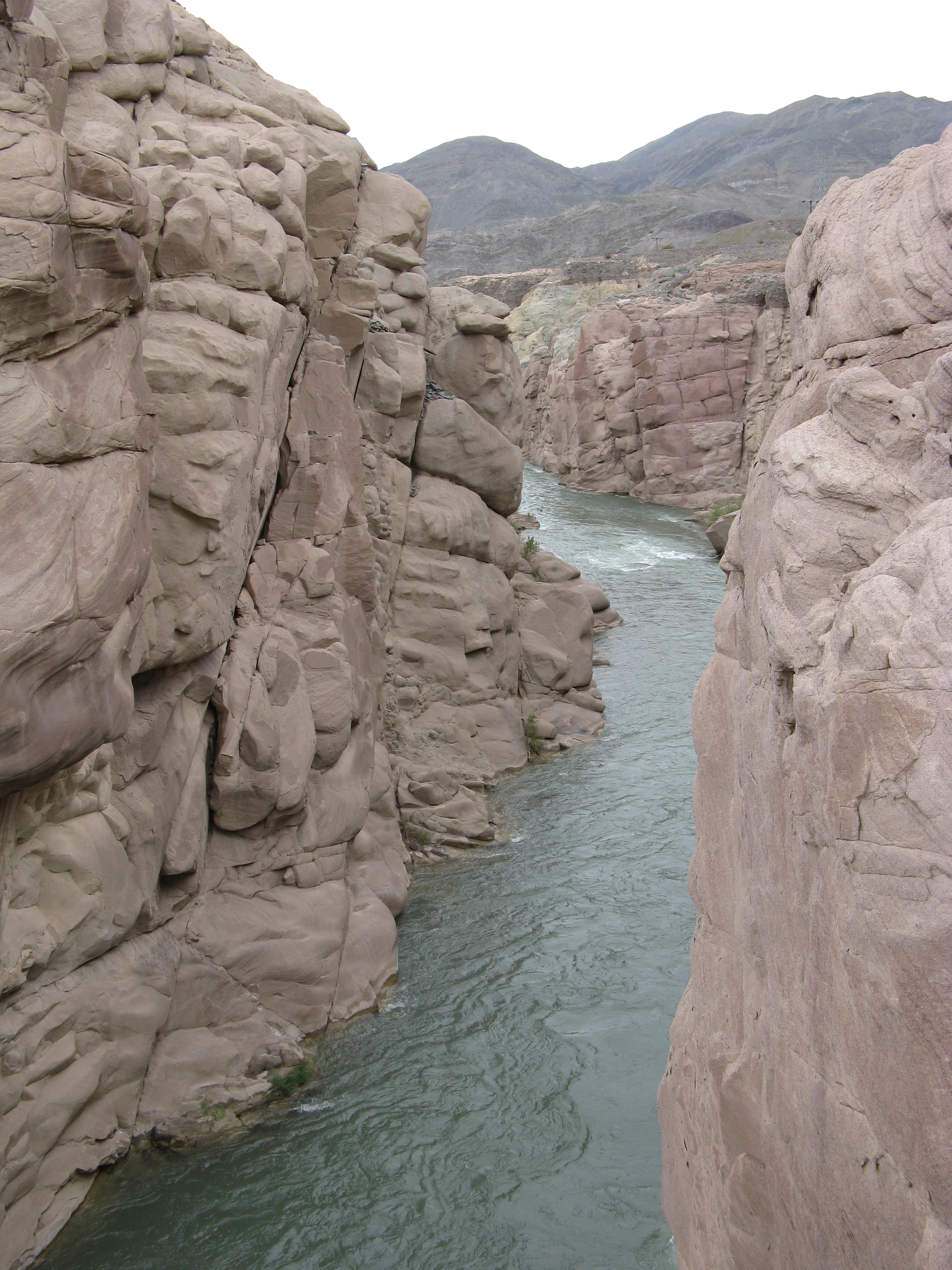
Canyon along the Jáchal River

The Jáchal River is a river in the province of San Juan, Argentina. It is part of the Desaguadero River basin, and one of the most important permanent watercourses in the province, with an average flow of 9 cubic metres per second (320 cu ft/s). It is born from the confluence of the Río de la Palca and the Blanco River, in the northwest of San Juan. The name has three possible meanings in the native Cacana language: "River of the groves", "land of metals" or "dragged stones", the latter being the most favoured by linguists.

== Course ==
From its origin, the Jáchal flows south for 75 kilometres (47 mi), up to a ravine in the pre-Andean range, in a place called Cuesta del Viento. There, it turns eastward towards the city of San José de Jáchal, flowing for 40 kilometres (25 mi) along a steep gorge. Upon reaching Jáchal, the river turns south again for 40 kilometres (25 mi), and then northeast-southeast, passing by the towns of Tucunuco and Mogna. It then flows 100 kilometres (62 mi) and empties into the upper Desaguadero River (here known as Bermejo).

The Jáchal River is fed primarily by snow thaw, rainfall being only a minor contribution in this semi-arid region. Its drainage basin covers an area of 34,232 square kilometres (13,217 mi^{2}), or around 23,000 square kilometres (8,900 mi^{2}) if considered up to Cuesta del Viento.

The river is dammed in two points:

- The Cuesta del Viento Dam, 40 kilometres (25 mi) from Jáchal, has a maximum volume of 136 million cubic metres (110,000 acre⋅ft). It is used to regulate and direct the flow for irrigation, and long-delayed works are in progress to finish a hydroelectric power station.
- The Salto de la Loma hydroelectric plant, 4 kilometres (2.5 mi) northwest of Jáchal, employs a 40-metre (130 ft) high fall and has an installed power of about 1,200 kW.

== Environmental issues ==
The Jáchal is the most important natural source of water for domestic, agricultural and industrial use in its valley, but the quality of its waters is not considered good in normal conditions, due to a high mineralization, especially salts and boron content. The latter has been found in concentrations of 2.8 parts per million (0.7 ppm are considered the upper limit for sensitive crops such as grapes).

In the early 2000s, Barrick Gold Corporation, a Canadian enterprise and the largest gold-mining corporation in the world, started a gold extraction project in the San Juan Andean ranges. Residents of San Juan protested against the project, claiming that the cyanide process will pollute the upper courses of the Jáchal and San Juan rivers. In an interview in February 2006, the governor of San Juan, José Luis Gioja, denied the possibility of such damage.

In 2015, Barrick Gold Corporation admitted that 224,000 liters of "cyanide solution" had spilled into the Jáchal and four other nearby rivers due to what they described as "a faulty valve". While Barrick Gold Corporation and the San Juan Mining Chamber insisted that the spill posed "no threat" to the area's population, the provincial government advised that residents only drink bottled water until further notice.
