= San Juan, Argentina =

San Juan
- City
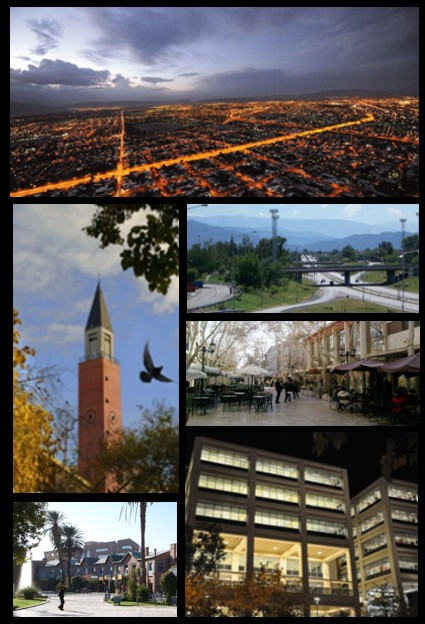
- Collage of San Juan

- Coat of arms
- Nickname: "Oasis City"
- Location in Argentina
- Coordinates: 31°32′03″S 68°31′34″W
- Country: Argentina
- Province: San Juan
- Department: Capital Department
- Settled: 1562
- Founder: Juan Jufré

Government
  - Intendant: Susana Laciar (PyT)

Area
  - City: 30 km^{2} (12 sq mi)
- Elevation: 640 m (2,100 ft)

Population (2010 census)
  - Density: 3,759.3/km^{2} (9,737/sq mi)
  - Urban: 109,123
  - Metro: 453,000
  - Demonym: sanjuanino
- Time zone: UTC−3 (ART)
- CPA Base: J 5400
- Area code: +54 264
- Website: Official website

San Juan (Spanish pronunciation: [saŋ ˈxwan]) is the capital and largest city of the Argentine province of San Juan in the Cuyo region, located in the Tulúm Valley, west of the San Juan River, at 650 m (2,133 ft) above mean sea level, with a population of around 112,000 as per the 2001 census [INDEC] (over 500,000 in the metropolitan area).

In agriculture, wine is economically important.

The 1944 San Juan earthquake on January 15 killed around 10,000 people and left half of the provincial population homeless.

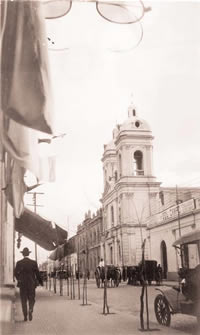
Downtown San Juan c. 1910.

== Geography ==
The city of San Juan is located in a fertile valley within a rocky mountainous area. Winter temperatures are generally mild, averaging between 1 °C (33.8 °F) and 16 °C (60.8 °F), but can drop below −9 °C (15.8 °F). Summers are hot, with average temperatures between 19 °C (66.2 °F) and 35 °C (95.0 °F), and a record maximum of 46.7 °C (116.1 °F) on December 20, 1995. Sunny weather is common in all months and San Juan averages about 3,361.3 hours of bright sunshine, or about 76% of possible sunshine, ranging from a low of 68% in June to a high of 81% possible sunshine in May. Under the Köppen climate classification, San Juan has a desert climate (BWh/BWk).

Climate data for San Juan Airport, Argentina (1991–2020, extremes 1961–present)
Month	Jan	Feb	Mar	Apr	May	Jun	Jul	Aug	Sep	Oct	Nov	Dec	Year
Record high °C (°F)	45.4 (113.7)	45.1 (113.2)	42.1 (107.8)	39.3 (102.7)	38.1 (100.6)	37.6 (99.7)	36.6 (97.9)	38.5 (101.3)	41.8 (107.2)	42.5 (108.5)	44.5 (112.1)	46.7 (116.1)	46.7 (116.1)
Mean daily maximum °C (°F)	35.1 (95.2)	33.3 (91.9)	30.5 (86.9)	25.3 (77.5)	20.5 (68.9)	17.3 (63.1)	16.7 (62.1)	20.3 (68.5)	23.8 (74.8)	27.9 (82.2)	31.6 (88.9)	34.4 (93.9)	26.4 (79.5)
Daily mean °C (°F)	27.3 (81.1)	25.6 (78.1)	22.8 (73.0)	17.3 (63.1)	12.3 (54.1)	8.4 (47.1)	7.5 (45.5)	10.7 (51.3)	14.9 (58.8)	19.6 (67.3)	23.5 (74.3)	26.4 (79.5)	18.0 (64.4)
Mean daily minimum °C (°F)	19.8 (67.6)	18.4 (65.1)	16.1 (61.0)	10.9 (51.6)	6.0 (42.8)	1.5 (34.7)	0.3 (32.5)	2.7 (36.9)	6.6 (43.9)	11.3 (52.3)	15.0 (59.0)	18.0 (64.4)	10.5 (50.9)
Record low °C (°F)	7.8 (46.0)	7.5 (45.5)	2.5 (36.5)	−1.6 (29.1)	−4.1 (24.6)	−9.2 (15.4)	−9.0 (15.8)	−7.2 (19.0)	−5.1 (22.8)	−0.5 (31.1)	2.1 (35.8)	6.5 (43.7)	−9.2 (15.4)
Average precipitation mm (inches)	17.4 (0.69)	22.5 (0.89)	10.8 (0.43)	4.6 (0.18)	3.4 (0.13)	1.8 (0.07)	1.3 (0.05)	2.6 (0.10)	3.7 (0.15)	2.9 (0.11)	7.2 (0.28)	12.4 (0.49)	90.6 (3.57)
Average precipitation days (≥ 0.1 mm)	3.5	2.6	2.2	1.3	1.1	0.4	0.6	0.5	1.0	1.0	1.4	2.0	17.6
Average snowy days	0.0	0.0	0.0	0.0	0.0	0.1	0.3	0.2	0.1	0.0	0.0	0.0	0.5
Average relative humidity (%)	43.0	46.9	52.6	57.3	62.2	60.2	55.1	45.5	40.8	38.8	38.2	38.1	48.2
Mean monthly sunshine hours	313.1	274.0	272.8	234.0	213.9	201.0	226.3	248.0	252.0	291.4	315.0	319.3	3,160.8
Mean daily sunshine hours	10.1	9.7	8.8	7.8	6.9	6.7	7.3	8.0	8.4	9.4	10.5	10.3	8.7
Percentage possible sunshine	78	78	74	81	71	68	75	74	74	76	79	80	76
Source 1: Servicio Meteorológico Nacional (snow 1991–2000)
Source 2: UNLP (percent sun 1971–1980)

Since very little rain falls in the region, the San Juan River has been dammed to provide a regular source of water to the city. The resulting reservoir is located in Ullum, and is known as the Quebrada de Ullum Dam. The dam also provides electrical power to the region.

Sixty-five percent of the surrounding area's agricultural production is related to wine production.

== Notable sites ==
The San Juan de Cuyo Cathedral was completed in 1979.

== Wine ==
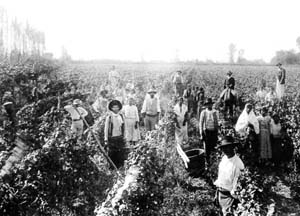
Harvest in the San Juan Region 1890

San Juan is ranked second among the wine-producing provinces of Argentina. It has a cultivated area of 116,700 acres at altitudes of between 1,970 (601m) and 4,590 feet (1399m) above sea level. This region specializes in Syrah, Malbec, Cabernet Sauvignon, Bonarda, Chardonnay and Torrontés. Because of this area's semi-desert climate, viticulture is dependent on irrigation from the San Juan and Jáchal Rivers.

== Notable residents ==
- Bandoneon musician, composer, and arranger Juan Pablo Jofre was born and raised in San Juan before relocating to New York City.
- César Garipe (born 1981), Argentine former professional footballer
- Henry Martin (born 1965), racing driver
- Telma Reca (1904–1979), pioneer in child and adolescent psychology and psychiatry was born in San Juan.
- Borja Toranzo (1759-1847), leading participant in the May Revolution
- Ricardo Zunino (born 1949), racing driver
