= Calamuchita =

Calamuchita might refer to several places in the province of Córdoba, Argentina:

- Santa Rosa de Calamuchita (city)
- Calamuchita Department (administrative subdivision of the province)
