= Embalse =

Embalse, the Spanish word for "reservoir", may refer to:

- Embalse, Argentina, a town
- Embalse Nuclear Power Station, located near Embalse
