= Calamuchita Department =

Calamuchita Department Departamento Calamuchita
- Department
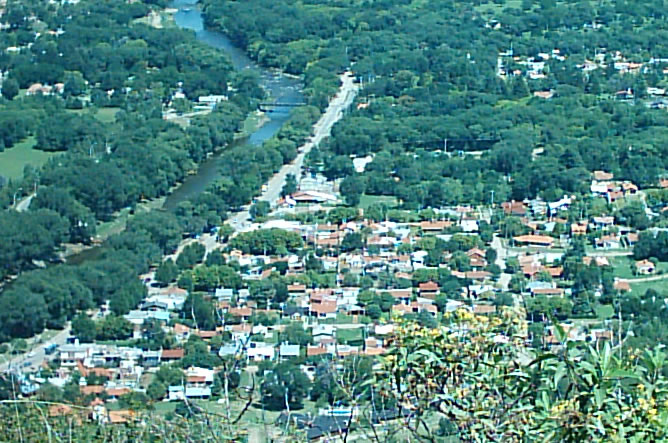
- Santa Rosa de Calamuchita

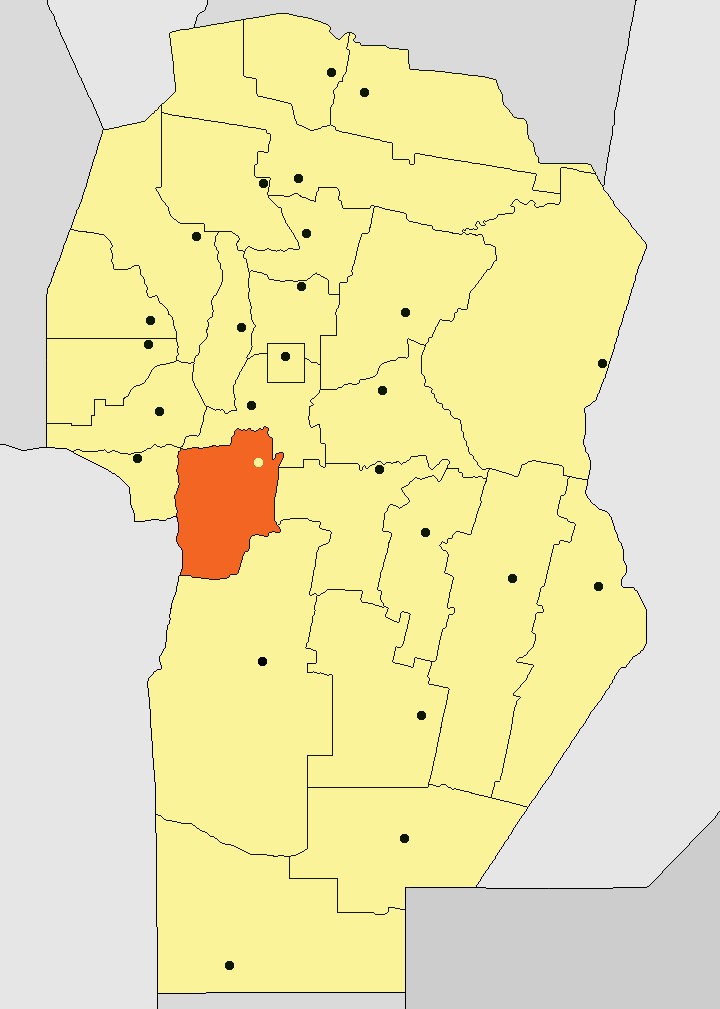
- Location of Calamuchita Department in Córdoba Province
- Coordinates: 31°59′S 64°22′W
- Country: Argentina
- Province: Córdoba
- Capital: San Agustín

Area
  - Total: 4,642 km^{2} (1,792 sq mi)

Population (2001 census [INDEC])
  - Total: 50,000
  - Density: 11/km^{2} (28/sq mi)
  - Pop. change (1991-2001): +17.04%
- Time zone: UTC-3 (ART)
- Postal code: X5191
- Dialing code: 03547
- Distances to
- Buenos Aires: 716 km (445 mi)
- Córdoba: 55 km (34 mi)

The Calamuchita Department (Spanish: Departamento Calamuchita) is a subdivision (department) of the province of Córdoba, Argentina.

The department is located in the center-west of the province and includes important tourist destinations, especially along the Calamuchita Valley. The center of this region is the city of Embalse home of one of the two functional nuclear power plants in Argentina (see Embalse nuclear power plant).

== Settlements ==
- Amboy
- Calmayo
- Cañada del Sauce
- Embalse
- La Cruz
- Las Bajadas
- Las Caleras
- Los Cóndores
- Los Molinos
- Los Reartes
- Lutti
- Río de Los Sauces
- San Agustín
- San Ignacio
- Santa Rosa de Calamuchita
- Segunda Usina
- Villa Amancay
- Villa Ciudad Parque Los Reartes
- Villa del Dique
- Villa General Belgrano
- Villa Quillinzo
- Villa Rumipal
- Villa Yacanto
