= List of cities in Argentina =

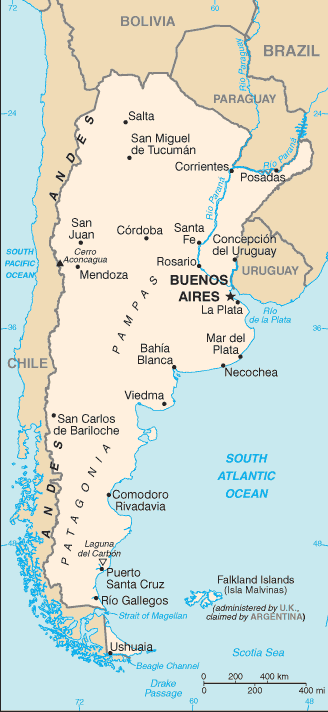
Map of Argentina

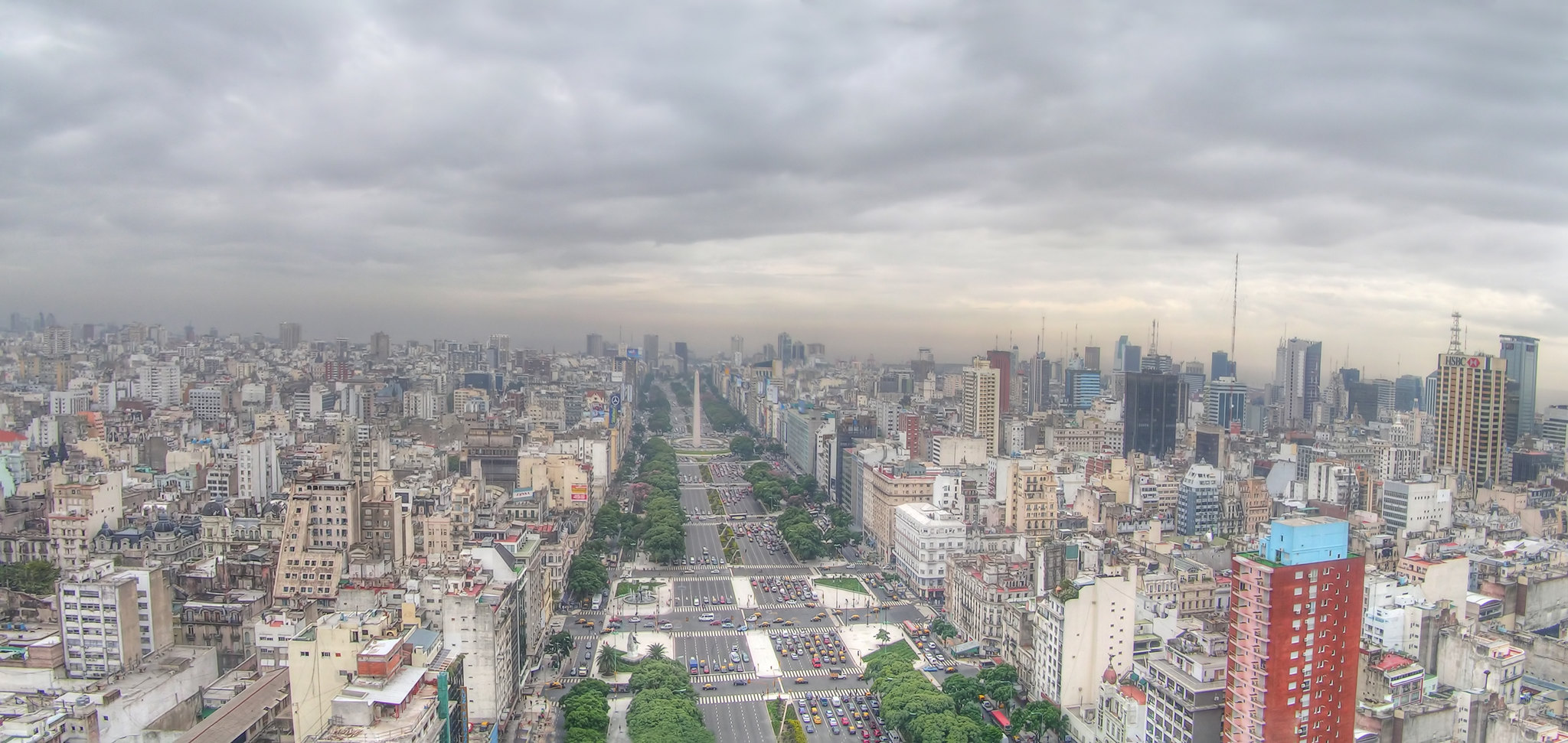
Buenos Aires, Capital of Argentina

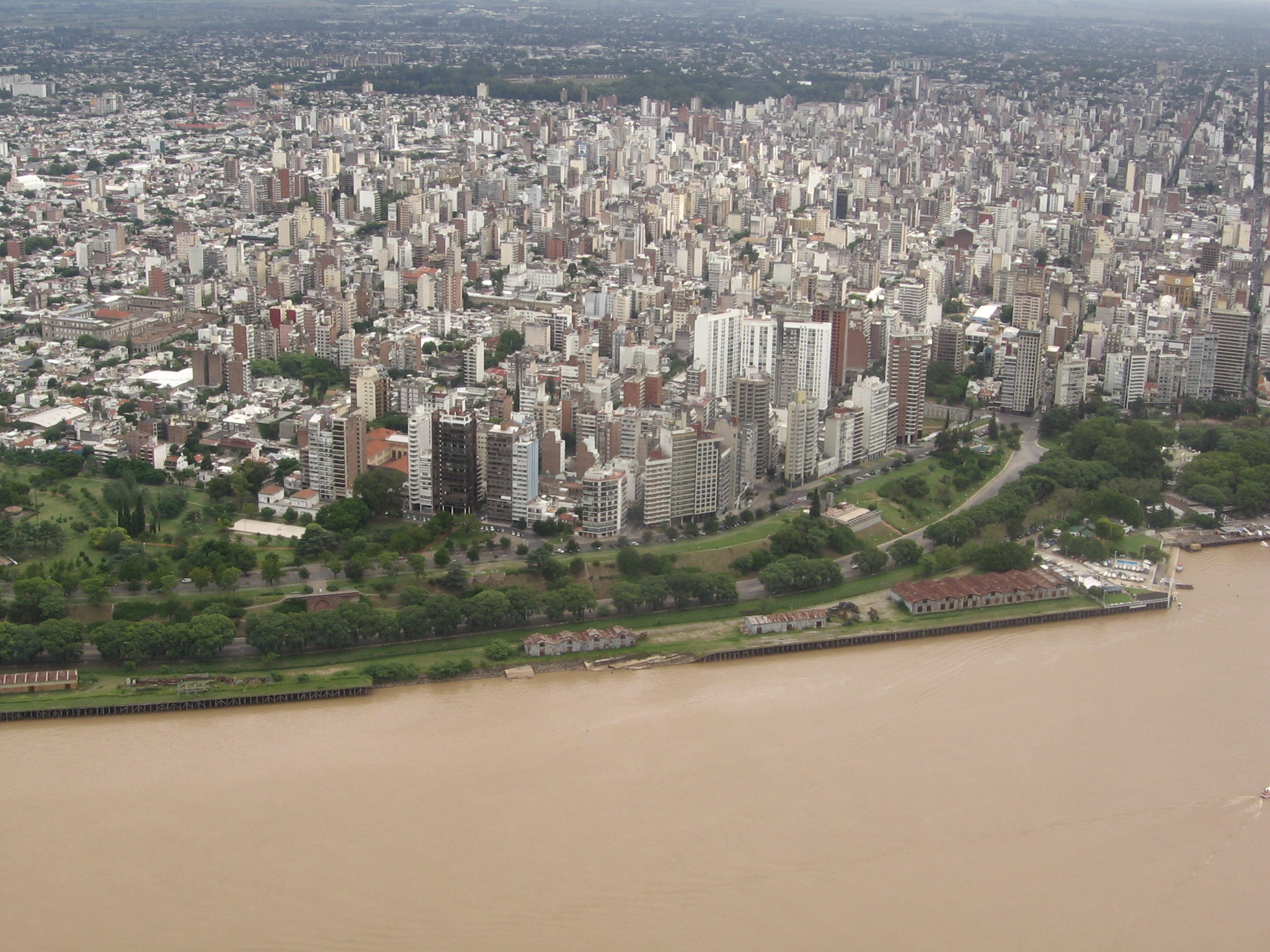
Rosario

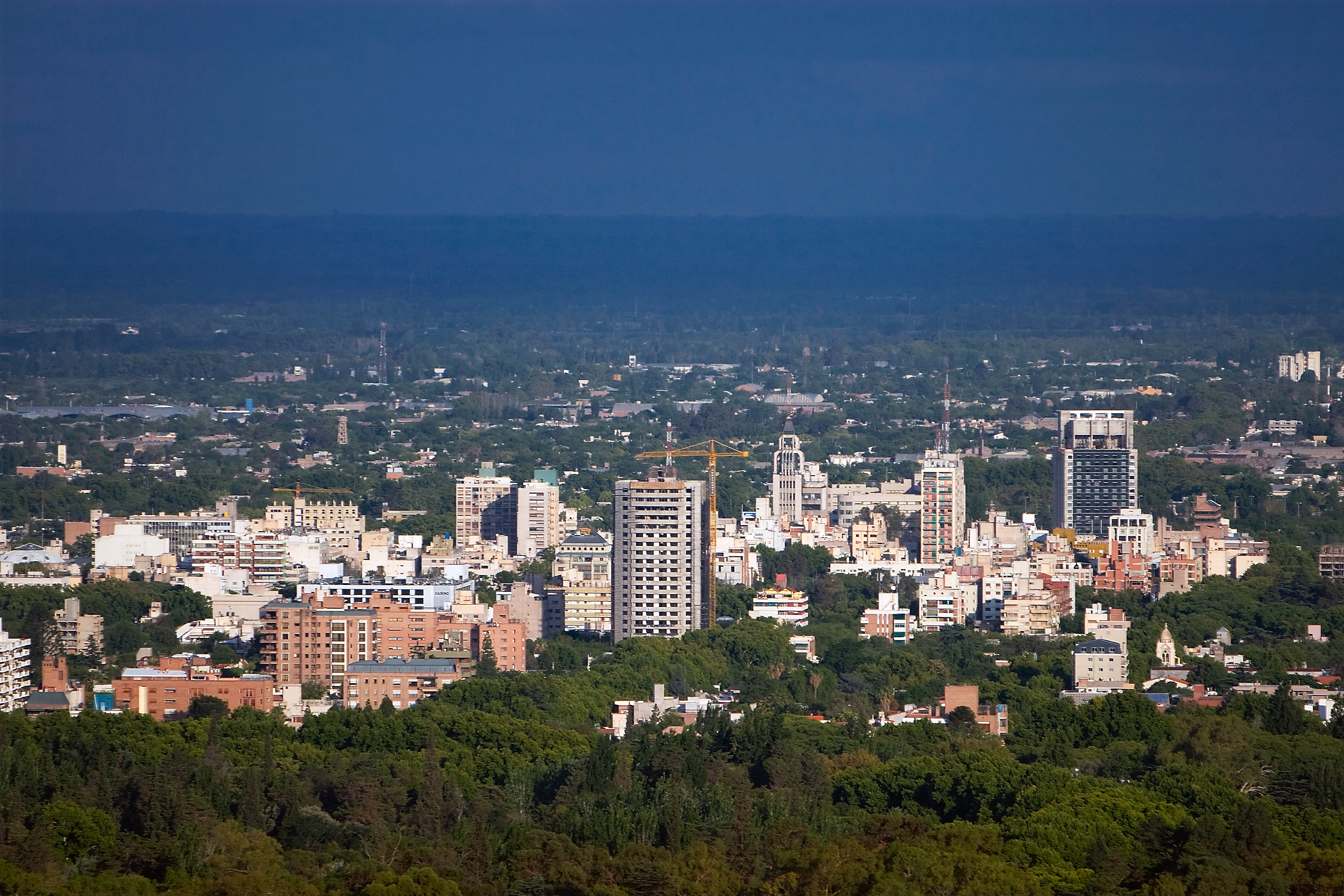
Mendoza

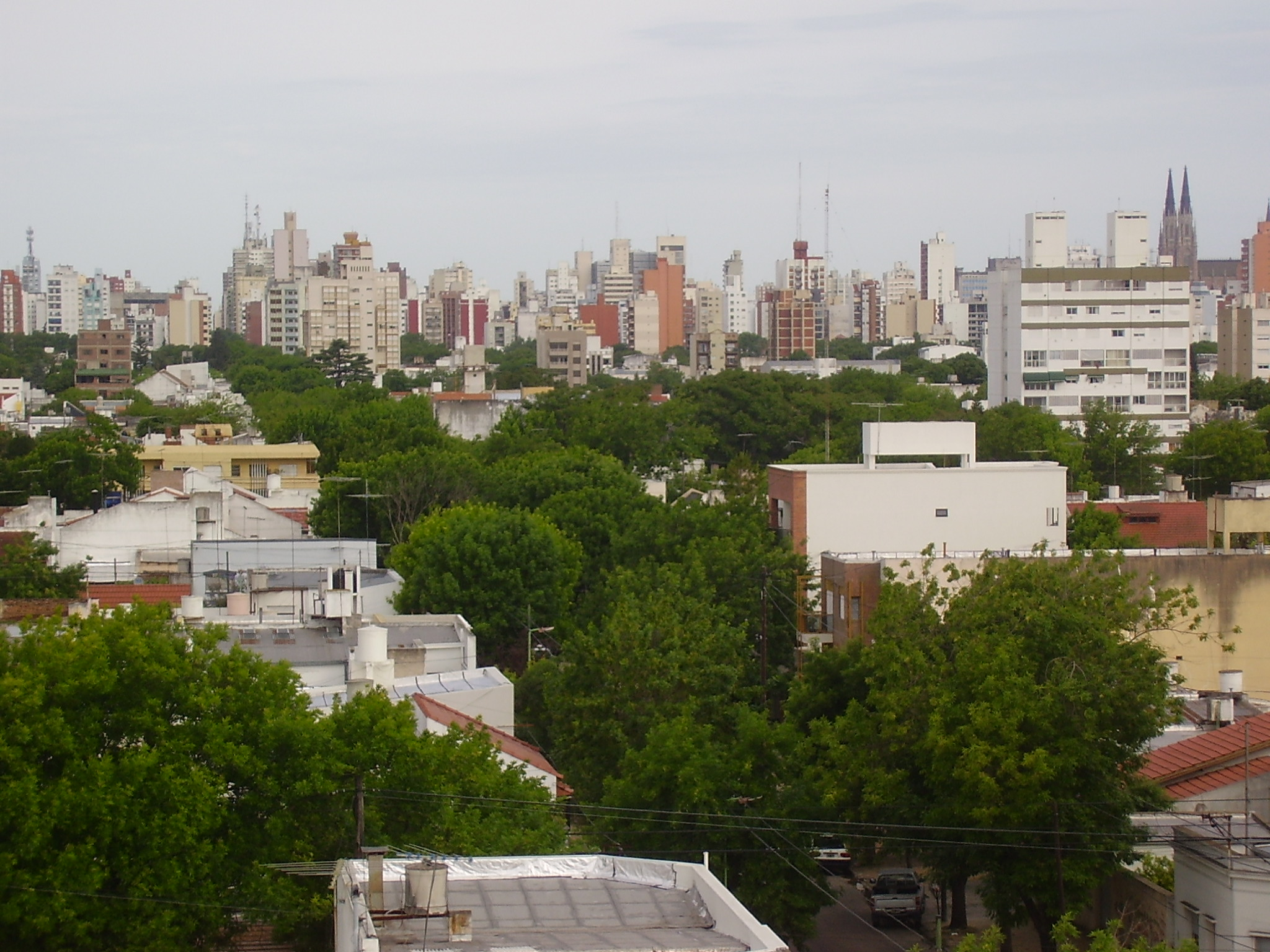
La Plata

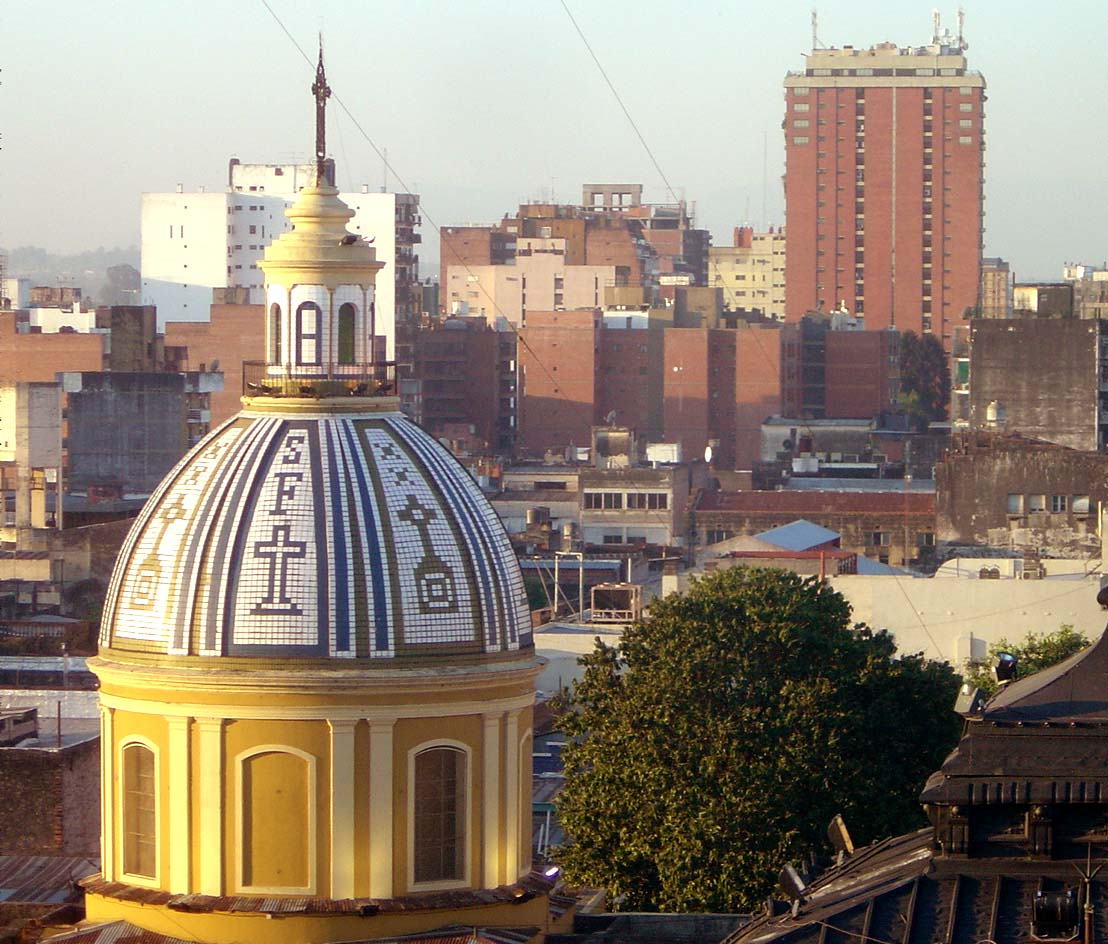
San Miguel de Tucumán

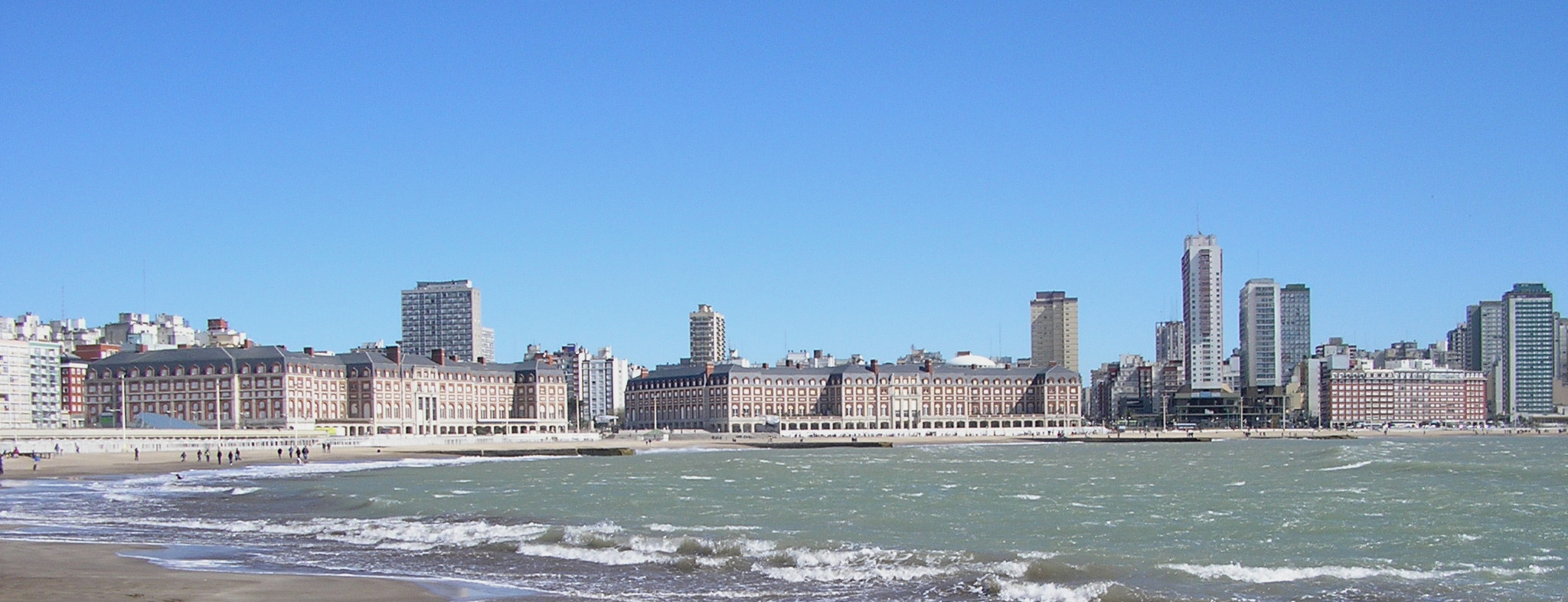
Mar del Plata

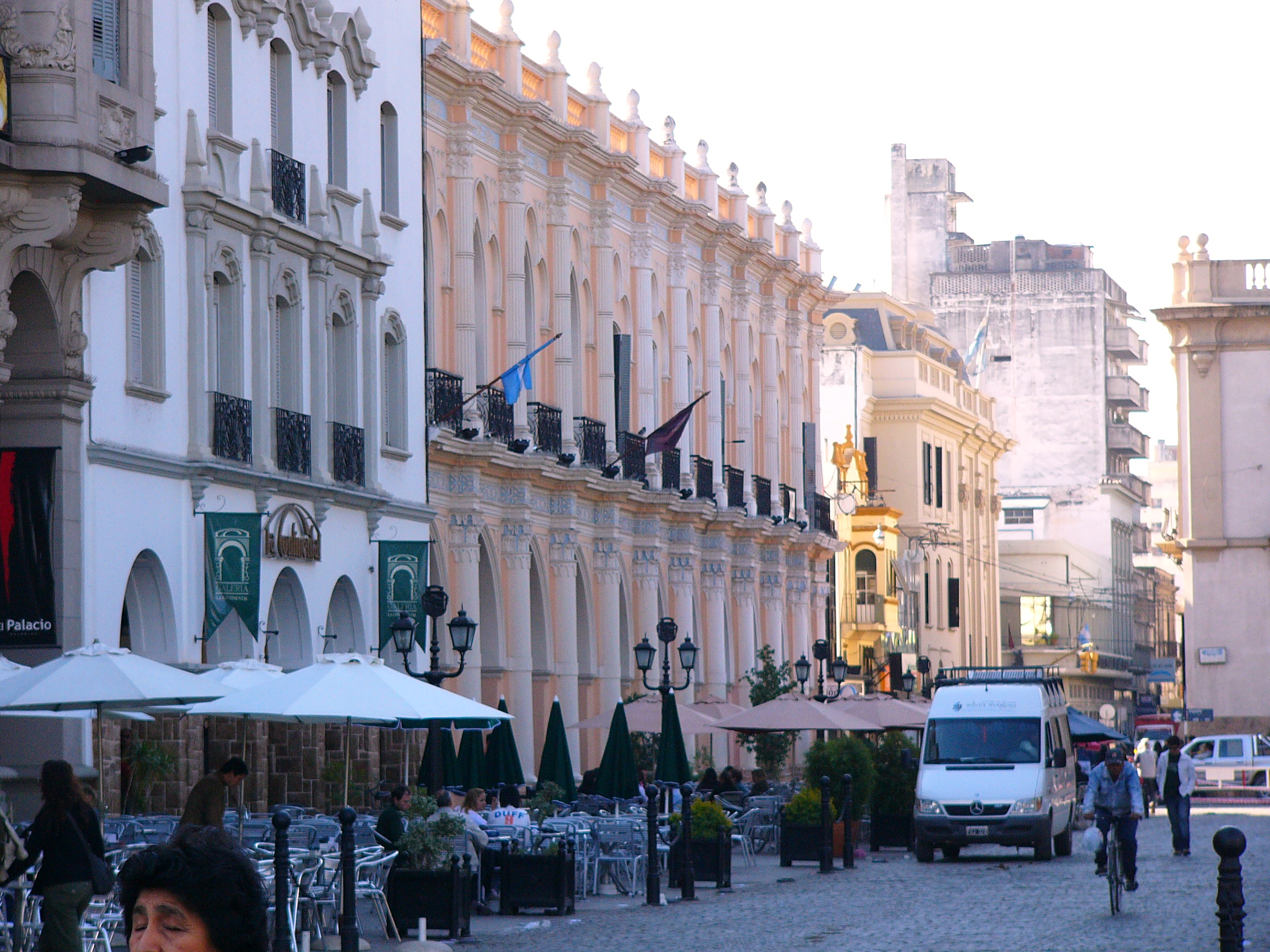
Salta

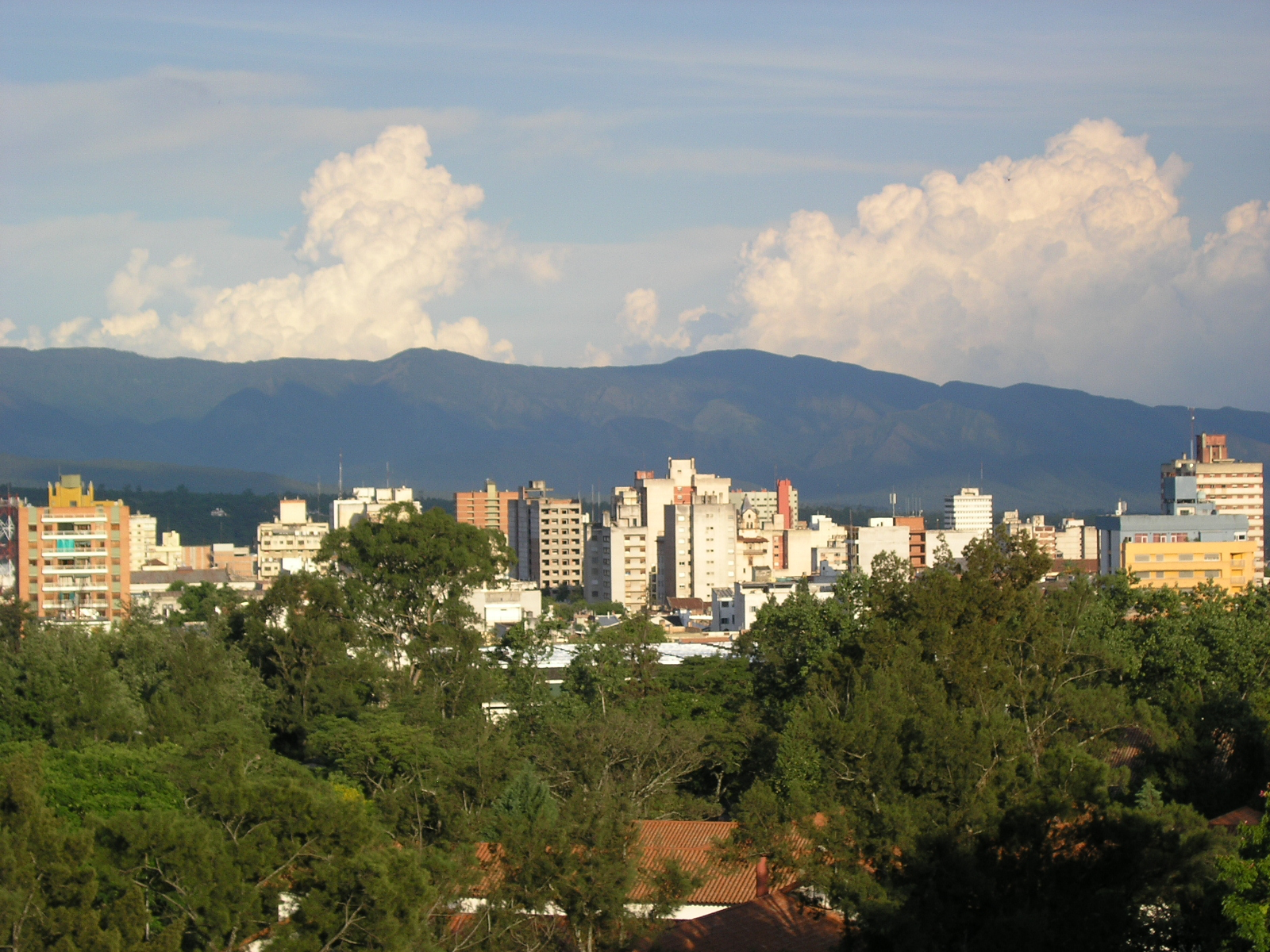
San Salvador de Jujuy

This is a list of cities in Argentina.

== List of Argentine cities ==
=== 45,000 to 150,000 inhabitants ===
This is a list of the localities of Argentina of 45,000 to 150,000 inhabitants ordered by amount of population according to the data of the 2001 INDEC Census.

- San Nicolás de los Arroyos (Buenos Aires) 133,602
- San Rafael (Mendoza) 104,782
- Rafael Castillo (Buenos Aires) 103,992
- Trelew (Chubut) 103,305
- Santa Rosa (La Pampa) 101,987
- Tandil (Buenos Aires) 101,010
- Río Grande (Tierra del Fuego) 98,017
- Villa Mercedes (San Luis) 97,000
- Puerto Madryn (Chubut) 93,995
- Morón (Buenos Aires) 92,725
- Virrey del Pino (Buenos Aires) 90,382
- Caseros (Buenos Aires) 90,313
- San Carlos de Bariloche (Río Negro) 90,000
- Maipú (Mendoza) 89,433
- Zárate (Buenos Aires) 86,686
- Burzaco (Buenos Aires) 86,113
- Pergamino (Buenos Aires) 85,487
- Grand Bourg (Buenos Aires) 85,159
- Monte Chingolo (Buenos Aires) 85,060
- Olavarría (Buenos Aires) 83,738
- Rawson (San Juan) 83,605
- Rafaela (Santa Fe) 82,530
- Junín (Buenos Aires) 82,427
- Remedios de Escalada (Buenos Aires) 81,465
- La Tablada (Buenos Aires) 80,389
- Río Gallegos (Santa Cruz) 79,072
- Campana (Buenos Aires) 77,838
- Presidencia Roque Sáenz Peña (Chaco) 76,377
- Rivadavia (San Juan) 75,950
- Florida (Buenos Aires) 75,891
- Villa Madero (Buenos Aires) 75,582
- Olivos (Buenos Aires) 75,527
- Gualeguaychú (Entre Ríos) 74,681
- Villa Gobernador Gálvez (Santa Fe) 74,658
- Villa Luzuriaga (Buenos Aires) 73,952
- Boulogne Sur Mer (Buenos Aires) 73,496
- Chimbas (San Juan) 73,210
- Ciudadela (Buenos Aires) 73,155
- Luján de Cuyo (Mendoza) 73,058
- Ezpeleta (Buenos Aires) 92,095
- Villa María (Córdoba) 72,162
- General Roca (Río Negro) 69,602
- San Fernando (Buenos Aires) 69,110
- Ciudad Evita (Buenos Aires) 68,650
- Venado Tuerto (Santa Fe) 68,508
- Bella Vista (Buenos Aires) 67,936
- Luján (Buenos Aires) 67,266
- San Ramón de la Nueva Orán (Salta) 66,579
- Cipolletti (Río Negro) 66,472
- Goya (Corrientes) 66,462
- Reconquista (Santa Fe) 66,187
- Wilde (Buenos Aires) 65,881
- Martínez (Buenos Aires) 65,859
- Necochea (Buenos Aires) 65,459
- Don Torcuato (Buenos Aires) 64,867
- Banda del Río Salí (Tucumán) 64,591
- Concepción del Uruguay (Entre Ríos) 64,538
- General Rodríguez (Buenos Aires) 63,317
- Villa Tesei (Buenos Aires) 63,164
- Ciudad Jardín El Libertador (Buenos Aires) 61,780
- Villa Carlos Paz (Córdoba) 60,900
- Sarandí (Buenos Aires) 60,725
- Villa Elvira (Buenos Aires) 59,476
- Villa Domínico (Buenos Aires) 58,824
- Béccar (Buenos Aires) 58,811
- San Francisco (Córdoba) 58,588
- Glew (Buenos Aires) 57,878
- Punta Alta (Buenos Aires) 57,296
- El Palomar (Buenos Aires) 57,146
- Rafael Calzada (Buenos Aires) 56,419
- Tartagal (Salta) 55,508
- San Pedro de Jujuy (Jujuy) 55,084
- Belén de Escobar (Buenos Aires) 55,054
- Mariano Acosta (Buenos Aires) 54,081
- San Francisco Solano (Buenos Aires) 53,363
- Los Polvorines (Buenos Aires) 53,354
- Azul (Buenos Aires) 53,054
- Chivilcoy (Buenos Aires) 52,938
- Lomas del Mirador (Buenos Aires) 52,971
- Guernica (Buenos Aires) 52,529
- General Pico (La Pampa) 52,414
- Mercedes (Buenos Aires) 51,967
- Bosques (Buenos Aires) 51,663
- Oberá (Misiones) 51,681
- Barranqueras (Chaco) 50,738
- Yerba Buena 50,057
- Villa Centenario (Buenos Aires) 49,737
- San Martín (Mendoza) 49,491
- Gobernador Julio A. Costa (Buenos Aires) 49,291
- William Morris (Buenos Aires) 48,916
- El Jagüel (Buenos Aires) 48,781
- Villa Mariano Moreno (Tucumán) 48,655
- Eldorado (Misiones) 47,794
- Longchamps (Buenos Aires) 47,622
- Clorinda (Formosa) 46,884
- Viedma (Río Negro) 46,767
- Concepcion (Tucumán) 46,194
- Tres Arroyos (Buenos Aires) 45,986
- Ushuaia (Tierra del Fuego) 45,205
- San Isidro (Buenos Aires) 45,190
- Palpala (Jujuy) 45,077

== Alphabetical order by province ==
=== Buenos Aires Province ===
- Adolfo Gonzales Chaves, Buenos Aires
- Alejandro Korn
- América
- Arrecifes
- Avellaneda
- Ayacucho
- Azul
- Bahía Blanca
- Balcarce
- Banfield
- Béccar
- Benito Juárez
- Berazategui
- Berisso
- Bragado
- Buenos Aires
- Burzaco
- Campana
- Cariló
- Carmen de Areco
- Carmen de Patagones
- Chacabuco
- Chivilcoy
- Ciudadela
- Ciudad Jardín
- Colonia Lapin
- Coronel Martínez
- Coronel Pringles
- Dolores
- El Palomar
- Ensenada
- Ezeiza
- Florencio Varela
- Florida Este
- General Alvear
- General Las Heras
- General Lavalle
- General Rodríguez
- General Villegas
- Guaminí
- Hurlingham
- Ingeniero Maschwitz
- Ituzaingó
- José C. Paz
- Junín
- La Lucila
- Lanús
- La Plata
- Las Flores
- Leandro N. Alem
- Lobos
- Lomas de Zamora
- Luján
- Mar del Plata
- Martínez
- Merlo
- Miramar
- Monte Grande
- Morón
- Munro
- Necochea
- Nueve de Julio
- Olavarría
- Olivos
- Parque San Martín
- Pehuajó
- Pergamino
- Pigüé
- Pilar
- Pinamar
- Rafael Calzada
- Quilmes
- San Antonio de Padua
- San Fernando
- San Isidro
- San Justo
- San Miguel del Monte
- San Nicolás de los Arroyos
- Santos Lugares
- Sarandí
- Tandil
- Tigre
- Trenque Lauquen
- Tres Arroyos
- Tres de Febrero
- Valentín Alsina
- Villa Gesell
- Villa Fiorito
- Villa Martelli
- Villa Mercedes
- Zárate

=== Catamarca ===
- San Fernando del Valle de Catamarca
- Andalgalá
- Belén
- San Isidro
- Santa María
- Saujil
- Tinogasta

=== Chaco ===
- Resistencia
- Barranqueras
- Castelli
- Charata
- General José de San Martín
- General Pinedo
- Presidencia Roque Sáenz Peña
- Villa Ángela

=== Chubut ===
- Rawson
- Comodoro Rivadavia
- Dolavon
- Esquel
- Gaiman
- Puerto Madryn
- Puerto Pirámides
- Rada Tilly
- Sarmiento
- Trelew
- Trevelin

=== Córdoba ===
- Córdoba
- Alta Gracia
- Arias
- Arroyito
- Bell Ville
- Canals
- Capilla del Monte
- Colonia Caroya
- Cosquín
- Cruz del Eje
- Ischilín
- James Craik
- Jesús María
- La Carlota
- La Cumbre
- La Cumbrecita
- La Falda
- Laboulaye
- Laguna Larga
- Las Varillas
- Leones
- Levalle
- Mina Clavero
- Miramar
- Morteros
- Oncativo
- Quilino
- Río Cuarto
- Río Segundo
- Río Tercero
- San Francisco del Chañar
- San Francisco
- Santa Rosa de Calamuchita
- Tanti
- Unquillo
- Valle Hermoso
- Vicuña Mackenna
- Villa Carlos Paz (or just Carlos Paz)
- Villa Cura Brochero
- Villa del Totoral
- Villa General Belgrano
- Villa María

=== Corrientes ===
- Corrientes (Capital)
- Alvear
- Bella Vista
- Curuzú Cuatiá
- Empedrado
- Esquina
- Gobernador Virasoro
- Goya
- Itatí
- Ituzaingó
- Paso de los Libres
- Santo Tomé
- Saladas
- Santa Lucía
- Sauce

=== Entre Ríos ===
- Paraná
- Basavilbaso
- Chajarí
- Colón
- Concepción del Uruguay
- Concordia
- Crespo
- Diamante
- Federación
- Gualeguay
- Gualeguaychú
- La Paz
- Larroque
- Libertador San Martín
- Puiggari
- San José
- Urdinarrain
- Victoria
- Villa Elisa
- Villa Paranacito
- Villaguay

=== Formosa ===
- Formosa
- Clorinda
- Ibarreta
- Las Lomitas
- Puerto Pilcomayo

=== Jujuy ===
- San Salvador de Jujuy
- General San Martín
- Humahuaca
- León
- La Quiaca
- San Pedro
- Tilcara

=== La Pampa ===
- Santa Rosa
- Eduardo Castex
- General Pico
- Guatraché
- Macachín
- Realicó
- Santa Isabel

=== La Rioja ===
- La Rioja
- Aimogasta
- Anillaco
- Chepes
- Chilecito
- Chamical
- Famatina
- Patquía
- Villa Unión

=== Mendoza ===
- Mendoza
- General Alvear
- Godoy Cruz
- La Paz
- Luján de Cuyo
- Malargüe
- Palmira
- Puente del Inca
- Punta de Vacas
- Rivadavia
- San Martín
- San Rafael
- Tunuyán
- Tupungato
- Uspallata

=== Misiones ===
- Posadas
- Andresito
- Apóstoles
- Bernardo de Irigoyen
- Candelaria
- Eldorado
- Montecarlo
- Oberá
- Puerto Iguazú

=== Neuquén ===
- Neuquén
- Aluminé
- Centenario
- Chos Malal
- Cutral Có
- Junín de los Andes
- Loncopué
- Piedra del Águila
- Plottier
- San Martín de los Andes
- Villa La Angostura
- Zapala

=== Río Negro ===
- Viedma
- Choele Choel
- Cipolletti
- El Bolsón
- General Roca
- Ingeniero Jacobacci
- San Antonio Oeste
- San Carlos de Bariloche
- Sierra Grande
- Villa Regina

=== Salta ===
- Salta
- Cachi
- Cafayate
- General Güemes
- Salvador Mazza
- San Antonio de los Cobres
- San Ramón de la Nueva Orán
- Tartagal

=== San Juan ===
- San Juan
- Calingasta
- Caucete
- San José de Jáchal
- Media Agua
- Zonda
- Albardón
- 9 de Julio
- Villa Krause
- Villa Paula
- Aberastain

=== San Luis ===
- San Luis
- Merlo
- La Punta
- San Francisco
- El Trapiche
- Villa Mercedes

=== Santa Cruz ===
- Comandante Luis Piedrabuena
- Puerto Santa Cruz
- Caleta Olivia
- El Calafate
- El Chaltén
- Gobernador Gregores
- Los Antiguos
- Pico Truncado
- Puerto Deseado
- Puerto San Julián
- Río Gallegos
- Río Turbio

=== Santa Fe ===
- Santa Fe
- Cañada de Gómez
- Carlos Pellegrini
- Coronda
- Esperanza
- Funes
- Frontera
- Rafaela
- Reconquista
- Rosario
- Rufino
- San Carlos Centro
- San Lorenzo
- Santo Tomé
- Sauce Viejo
- Sunchales
- Venado Tuerto
- Villa Cañás
- Villa Constitución

=== Santiago del Estero ===
- Santiago del Estero
- Añatuya
- Frías
- Isca Yacu
- La Banda
- Loreto
- Termas de Río Hondo

=== Tierra del Fuego ===
- Ushuaia
- Río Grande
- Tolhuin

=== Tucumán ===
- San Miguel de Tucumán
- Aguilares
- Banda del Río Salí
- Concepción
- Famaillá
- Lules
- Monteros
- Simoca
- Tafí del Valle
- Tafí Viejo
- Yerba Buena

== See also ==
- List of cities in Argentina by population
- List of cities
- List of cities in South America
