= 2014 Rally Argentina =

Car rally

2014 Rally Argentina 34º Rally Argentina
Round 5 of the 2014 World Rally Championship season
| ← Previous event | Next event → |
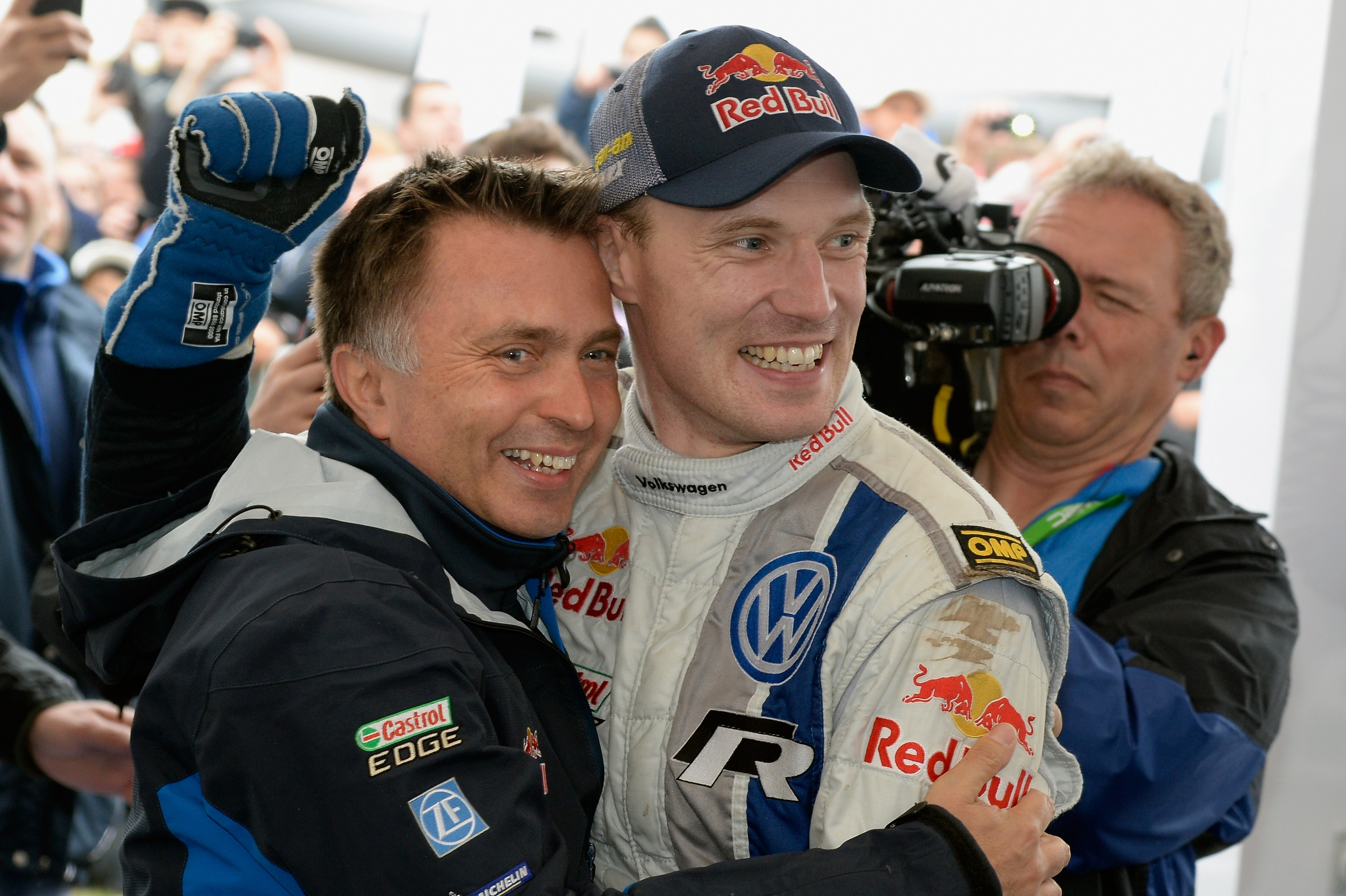
- Host country: Argentina
- Rally base: Villa Carlos Paz, Argentina
- Dates run: May 8 – May 11, 2014
- Stages: 14 (405.10 km; 251.72 miles)
- Stage surface: Gravel

Statistics
- Crews: 29 at start, 23 at finish

Overall results
- Overall winner: (Finland) Jari-Matti Latvala (Finland) Miikka Anttila (Germany) Volkswagen Motorsport

The 2014 Rally Argentina was the fifth round of the 2014 World Rally Championship season. The event was based in Villa Carlos Paz, Argentina, and started on 8 May and finished on 11 May after fourteen special stages, totaling 405.1 competitive kilometres.

Finnish driver Jari-Matti Latvala won the Rally Argentina for the first time, taking his second of three victories during the 2014 season.

== Entry list ==
Entry List
| No. | Entrant | Class | Driver | Co-driver | Car | Tyre |
|---|---|---|---|---|---|---|
| 1 | (Germany) Volkswagen Motorsport | WRC | (France) Sébastien Ogier | (France) Julien Ingrassia | Volkswagen Polo R WRC | M |
| 2 | (Germany) Volkswagen Motorsport | WRC | (Finland) Jari-Matti Latvala | (Finland) Miikka Anttila | Volkswagen Polo R WRC | M |
| 3 | (France) Citroën Total Abu Dhabi WRT | WRC | (United Kingdom) Kris Meeke | (Republic of Ireland) Paul Nagle | Citroën DS3 WRC | M |
| 4 | (France) Citroën Total Abu Dhabi WRT | WRC | (Norway) Mads Østberg | (Sweden) Jonas Andersson | Citroën DS3 WRC | M |
| 5 | (United Kingdom) M-Sport World Rally Team | WRC | (Finland) Mikko Hirvonen | (Finland) Jarmo Lehtinen | Ford Fiesta RS WRC | M |
| 6 | (United Kingdom) M-Sport World Rally Team | WRC | (United Kingdom) Elfyn Evans | (United Kingdom) Daniel Barritt | Ford Fiesta RS WRC | M |
| 7 | (Germany) Hyundai Motorsport | WRC | (Belgium) Thierry Neuville | (Belgium) Nicolas Gilsoul | Hyundai i20 WRC | M |
| 8 | (Germany) Hyundai Motorsport | WRC | (Spain) Dani Sordo | (Spain) Marc Martí | Hyundai i20 WRC | M |
| 9 | (Germany) Volkswagen Motorsport II | WRC | (Norway) Andreas Mikkelsen | (Finland) Mikko Markkula | Volkswagen Polo R WRC | M |
| 10 | (United Kingdom) RK M-Sport World Rally Team | WRC | (Poland) Robert Kubica | (Poland) Maciej Szczepaniak | Ford Fiesta RS WRC | M |
| 21 | (Czech Republic) Jipocar Czech National Team | WRC | (Czech Republic) Martin Prokop | (Czech Republic) Jan Tománek | Ford Fiesta RS WRC | M |
| 32 | (Ukraine) Yuriy Protasov | WRC-2 | (Ukraine) Yuriy Protasov | (Ukraine) Pavlo Cherepin | Ford Fiesta RRC | M |
| 33 | (Italy) www.Rallyproject.com srl | WRC-2 | (Italy) Massimiliano Rendina | (Italy) Mario Pizzuti | Mitsubishi Lancer Evo X | P |
| 34 | ABR Paraguay by Astra | WRC-2 | (Paraguay) Augusto Bestard | (Paraguay) Enrique Fratta | Mitsubishi Lancer Evo X | D |
| 35 | (United Kingdom) Drive DMACK | WRC-2 | (Finland) Jari Ketomaa | (Finland) Kaj Lindström | Ford Fiesta R5 | D |
| 36 | (France) Quentin Gilbert | WRC-2 | (France) Quentin Gilbert | (Belgium) Renaud Jamoul | Ford Fiesta R5 | D |
| 37 | (Italy) FWRT s.r.l. | WRC-2 | (Italy) Lorenzo Bertelli | (Italy) Mitia Dotta | Ford Fiesta RRC | P |
| 38 | (United Kingdom) Drive DMACK | WRC-2 | (Estonia) Ott Tänak | (Estonia) Raigo Mőlder | Ford Fiesta R5 | D |
| 39 | (Paraguay) Gustavo Saba | WRC-2 | (Paraguay) Gustavo Saba | (Argentina) Diego Cagnotti | Škoda Fabia S2000 | D |
| 40 | (Qatar) Nasser Al-Attiyah | WRC-2 | (Qatar) Nasser Al-Attiyah | (Italy) Giovanni Bernacchini | Ford Fiesta RRC | M |
| 41 | (Peru) Nicolás Fuchs | WRC-2 | (Peru) Nicolás Fuchs | (Argentina) Fernando Mussano | Ford Fiesta R5 | D |
| 42 | (Paraguay) Diego Domínguez | WRC-2 | (Paraguay) Diego Domínguez | (Argentina) Edgardo Galindo | Ford Fiesta R5 | D |
| 43 | (Italy) Gianluca Linari | WRC-2 | (Italy) Gianluca Linari | (Italy) Danilo Fappani | Subaru Impreza STi N15 | D |
| 44 | (Germany) Puma Rally Team | WRC-2 | (Qatar) Abdulaziz Al-Kuwari | (Republic of Ireland) Killian Duffy | Ford Fiesta RRC | M |
| 46 | MZR Paraguay | WRC-2 | (Paraguay) Miguel Ángel Zaldivar | (Paraguay) Fernando Mendonca | Ford Fiesta R5 | D |
| 47 | (Chile) Ramón Torres | WRC-2 | (Chile) Ramón Torres | (Argentina) José Díaz | Mitsubishi Lancer Evo IX | D |
| 72 | (Argentina) Juan Carlos Alonso | WRC-2 | (Argentina) Juan Carlos Alonso | (Argentina) Juan Pablo Monasterolo | Mitsubishi Lancer Evo IX | D |

| Icon | Class |
|---|---|
| WRC | WRC entries eligible to score manufacturer points |
| WRC-2 | Registered to take part in WRC-2 championship |

== Results ==
=== Event standings ===
| Pos. | No. | Driver | Co-driver | Team | Car | Class | Time | Difference | Points |
Overall classification
| 1 | 2 | (Finland) Jari-Matti Latvala | (Finland) Mikka Anttila | (Germany) Volkswagen Motorsport | Volkswagen Polo R WRC | WRC | 4:41:24.8 | 0.00 | 26 |
| 2 | 1 | (France) Sébastien Ogier | (France) Julien Ingrassia | (Germany) Volkswagen Motorsport | Volkswagen Polo R WRC | WRC | 4:42:51.7 | +1:26.9 | 21 |
| 3 | 3 | (United Kingdom) Kris Meeke | (Republic of Ireland) Paul Nagle | (France) Citroën Total Abu Dhabi WRT | Citroën DS3 WRC | WRC | 4:47:19.5 | +5:54.7 | 15 |
| 4 | 9 | (Norway) Andreas Mikkelsen | (Finland) Mikko Markkula | (Germany) Volkswagen Motorsport II | Volkswagen Polo R WRC | WRC | 4:47:43.1 | +6:18.3 | 12 |
| 5 | 7 | (Belgium) Thierry Neuville | (Belgium) Nicolas Gilsoul | (Germany) Hyundai Shell World Rally Team | Hyundai i20 WRC | WRC | 4:49:50.6 | +8:25.8 | 10 |
| 6 | 10 | (Poland) Robert Kubica | (Poland) Maciek Szczepaniak | (United Kingdom) RK M-Sport World Rally Team | Ford Fiesta RS WRC | WRC | 4:51:32.8 | +10:08.0 | 8 |
| 7 | 6 | (United Kingdom) Elfyn Evans | (United Kingdom) Daniel Barritt | (Germany) M-Sport World Rally Team | Ford Fiesta RS WRC | WRC | 4:51:57.0 | +10:32.2 | 6 |
| 8 | 21 | (Czech Republic) Martin Prokop | (Czech Republic) Jan Tománek | (Czech Republic) Jipocar Czech National Team | Ford Fiesta RS WRC | WRC | 4:53:28.7 | +12:03.9 | 4 |
| 9 | 5 | (Finland) Mikko Hirvonen | (Finland) Jarmo Lehtinen | (United Kingdom) M-Sport World Rally Team | Ford Fiesta RS WRC | WRC | 5:01:19.6 | +19:54.8 | 4 |
| 10 | 40 | (Qatar) Nasser Al-Attiyah | (Italy) Giovanni Bernacchini | (Qatar) Nasser Al-Attiyah | Ford Fiesta RRC | WRC-2 | 5:04:35.0 | +23:10.2 | 1 |
WRC-2 standings
| 1 (10.) | 40 | (Qatar) Nasser Al-Attiyah | (Italy) Giovanni Bernacchini | (Qatar) Nasser Al-Attiyah | Ford Fiesta RRC | WRC-2 | 5:04:35.0 | 0.0 | 25 |
| 2 (11.) | 41 | (Peru) Nicolás Fuchs | (Argentina) Fernando Mussano | (Peru) Nicolás Fuchs | Ford Fiesta RRC | WRC-2 | 5:10:10.7 | +5:35.7 | 18 |
| 3 (12.) | 42 | (Paraguay) Diego Domínguez | (Argentina) Edgardo Galindo | (Paraguay) Diego Domínguez | Ford Fiesta R5 | WRC-2 | 5:10:25.5 | +5:50.5 | 15 |
| 4 (13.) | 37 | (Italy) Lorenzo Bertelli | (Italy) Mitia Dotta | (Italy) FWRT s.r.l. | Ford Fiesta RRC | WRC-2 | 5:17:48.4 | +13:13.4 | 12 |
| 5 (14.) | 44 | (Qatar) Abdulaziz Al-Kuwari | (Republic of Ireland) Killian Duffy | (Germany) Puma Rally Team | Ford Fiesta RRC | WRC-2 | 5:25:52.4 | +21:17.4 | 10 |
| 6 (15.) | 46 | (Paraguay) Miguel Ángel Zaldivar | (Paraguay) Fernando Mendonca | MZR Paraguay | Ford Fiesta R5 | WRC-2 | 5:31:24.7 | +26:49.7 | 8 |
| 7 (16.) | 72 | (Argentina) Juan Carlos Alonso | (Argentina) Juan Pablo Monasterolo | (Argentina) EZD World Rally Team RM | Mitsubishi Lancer Evo IX | WRC-2 | 5:38:28.8 | +33:53.8 | 6 |
| 8 (17.) | 38 | (Estonia) Ott Tänak | (Estonia) Raigo Mőlder | (United Kingdom) Drive DMACK | Ford Fiesta R5 | WRC-2 | 5:41:05.3 | +36:30.3 | 4 |
| 9 (19.) | 34 | (Paraguay) Augusto Bestard | (Paraguay) Enrique Fratta | ABR Paraguay by Astra | Mitsubishi Lancer Evo X | WRC-2 | 5:41:56.3 | +37:21.3 | 2 |
| 10 (20.) | 47 | (Chile) Ramón Torres | (Argentina) José Díaz | (Chile) Ramón Torres | Mitsubishi Lancer Evo IX | WRC-2 | 5:42:09.4 | +37:34.4 | 1 |

=== Special stages ===
| Day | Stage | Name | Length | Winner | Car | Time | Rally leader |
|---|---|---|---|---|---|---|---|
| Leg 1 (8 May) | SS1 | Super Especial Fernet Branca | 6.04 km | (France) Sébastien Ogier | Volkswagen Polo R WRC | 4:51.7 | (France) Sébastien Ogier |
| Leg 1 (9 May) | SS2 | Santa Catalina - La Pampa 1 | 27.09 km | (France) Sébastien Ogier | Volkswagen Polo R WRC | 18:25.8 | (France) Sébastien Ogier |
| Leg 1 (9 May) | SS3 | Ascochinga - Agua de Oro 1 | 51.88 km | (Finland) Jari-Matti Latvala | Volkswagen Polo R WRC | 38:00.7 | (Finland) Jari-Matti Latvala |
| Leg 1 (9 May) | SS4 | Santa Catalina - La Pampa 2 | 27.09 km | (France) Sébastien Ogier | Volkswagen Polo R WRC | 18:10.0 | (France) Sébastien Ogier |
| Leg 1 (9 May) | SS5 | Ascochinga - Agua de Oro 2 | 51.88 km | (Finland) Jari-Matti Latvala | Volkswagen Polo R WRC | 37:57.3 | (Finland) Jari-Matti Latvala |
| Leg 2 (10 May) | SS6 | San Agustin - Villa del Dique 1 | 39.99 km | (Norway) Andreas Mikkelsen | Volkswagen Polo R WRC | 22:34.9 | (Finland) Jari-Matti Latvala |
| Leg 2 (10 May) | SS7 | Amboy - Yacanto 1 | 39.16 km | (Finland) Jari-Matti Latvala | Volkswagen Polo R WRC | 22:40.5 | (Finland) Jari-Matti Latvala |
| Leg 2 (10 May) | SS8 | San Agustin - Villa del Dique 2 | 39.99 km | (Finland) Jari-Matti Latvala | Volkswagen Polo R WRC | 22:30.8 | (Finland) Jari-Matti Latvala |
| Leg 2 (10 May) | SS9 | Amboy - Yacanto 2 | 39.16 km | (Finland) Jari-Matti Latvala | Volkswagen Polo R WRC | 22:48.3 | (Finland) Jari-Matti Latvala |
| Leg 2 (10 May) | SS10 | Super Especial Fernet Branca 2 | 6.04 km | (Belgium) Thierry Neuville | Hyundai i20 WRC | 5:02.5 | (Finland) Jari-Matti Latvala |
| Leg 3 (11 May) | SS11 | Giulio Cesare - Mina Clavero 1 | 22.07 km | (Finland) Mikko Hirvonen | Ford Fiesta RS WRC | 18:28.1 | (Finland) Jari-Matti Latvala |
| Leg 3 (11 May) | SS12 | El Condor - Copina 1 | 16.32 km | (Finland) Mikko Hirvonen | Ford Fiesta RS WRC | 14:57.8 | (Finland) Jari-Matti Latvala |
| Leg 3 (11 May) | SS13 | Giulio Cesare - Mina Clavero 2 | 22.07 km | (Finland) Mikko Hirvonen | Ford Fiesta RS WRC | 19:00.2 | (Finland) Jari-Matti Latvala |
| Leg 3 (11 May) | SS14 | El Condor - Copina 2 (Power Stage) | 16.32 km | (France) Sébastien Ogier | Volkswagen Polo R WRC | 14:29.3 | (Finland) Jari-Matti Latvala |

=== Power Stage ===
The "Power stage" was a 16.32 km (10.14 mi) stage at the end of the rally.

| Pos | Driver | Car | Time | Diff. | Pts |
|---|---|---|---|---|---|
| 1 | (France) Sébastien Ogier | Volkswagen Polo R WRC | 14:29.3 | 0.0 | 3 |
| 2 | (Finland) Mikko Hirvonen | Ford Fiesta RS WRC | 14:39.8 | +10.5 | 2 |
| 3 | (Finland) Jari-Matti Latvala | Volkswagen Polo R WRC | 14:39.9 | +10.6 | 1 |

== Standings after the rally ==
=== WRC ===
Drivers' Championship standings

| Pos. | Driver | Points |
|---|---|---|
| 1 | (France) Sebastien Ogier | 112 |
| 2 | (Finland) Jari-Matti Latvala | 88 |
| 3 | (Norway) Andreas Mikkelsen | 48 |
| 4 | (Norway) Mads Ostberg | 48 |
| 5 | (Finland) Mikko Hirvonen | 40 |

Manufacturers' Championship standings

| Pos. | Manufacturer | Points |
|---|---|---|
| 1 | (Germany) Volkswagen Motorsport | 187 |
| 2 | (France) Citroën World Rally Team | 90 |
| 3 | (United Kingdom) M-Sport World Rally Team | 68 |
| 4 | (Germany) Hyundai World Rally Team | 55 |
| 5 | (Germany) Volkswagen Motorsport II | 52 |

=== Other ===
WRC2 Drivers' Championship standings

| Pos. | Driver | Points |
|---|---|---|
| 1 | (Ukraine) Yuriy Protasov | 60 |
| 2 | (Italy) Lorenzo Bertelli | 56 |
| 3 | (Qatar) Nasser Al-Attiyah | 50 |
| 4 | (Estonia) Karl Kruuda | 37 |
| 5 | (Finland) Jari Ketomaa | 36 |

WRC3 Drivers' Championship standings

| Pos. | Driver | Points |
|---|---|---|
| 1 | (France) Quentin Gilbert | 25 |
| 2 | (France) Stéphane Lefebvre | 25 |
| 3 | (Germany) Christian Riedemann | 18 |
| 4 | (Slovakia) Martin Koči | 15 |
| 5 | (Switzerland) Federico della Casa | 12 |

Junior WRC Drivers' Championship standings

| Pos. | Driver | Points |
|---|---|---|
| 1 | (France) Stéphane Lefebvre | 25 |
| 2 | (Germany) Christian Riedemann | 18 |
| 3 | (Slovakia) Martin Koči | 15 |
| 4 | (Switzerland) Federico della Casa | 12 |
| 5 | (Italy) Simone Campedelli | 10 |
