= San Agustín, Córdoba =

San Agustín
- City
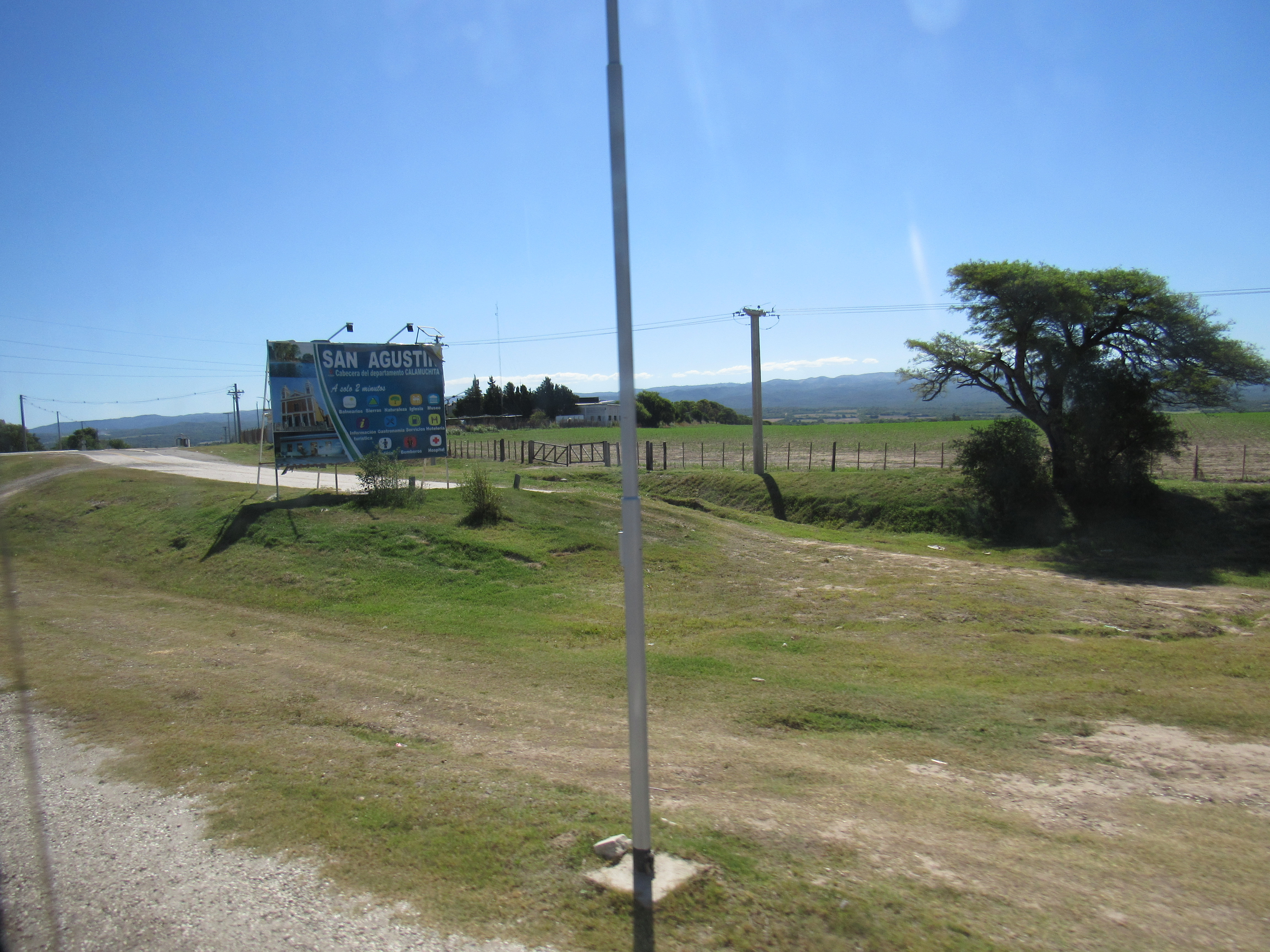

- Location of San Agustín in Argentina
- Coordinates: 31°59′S 64°23′W
- Country: Argentina
- Province: Córdoba
- Department: Calamuchita

Government
  - Intendant: Miguel Santiago Calderón (UCR)

Population
  - Total: 2,870
- Time zone: UTC−3 (ART)
- CPA base: X5191
- Dialing code: +54 3547

San Agustín is a city in the center-west of the province of Córdoba, Argentina. It has 2,870 inhabitants per the 2001 census [INDEC], and is the head town of the Calamuchita Department. It lies on National Route 36, about 60 km south from the provincial capital Córdoba. The area has been used as a special stage in the 2014 Rally Argentina.
