= Amboy, Argentina =

Coordinates: 32°10′30″S 64°34′22″W

Amboy
- Village and Commune
- Interactive map of Amboy
- Country: Argentina
- Province: Córdoba
- Department: Calamuchita Department

Government
  - Communal President: Raúl Oscar Álvarez
- Elevation: 602 m (1,975 ft)

Population (2001)
  - Total: 168
- Time zone: UTC−3 (ART)
- Postal code: X5199
- Area code: 03400

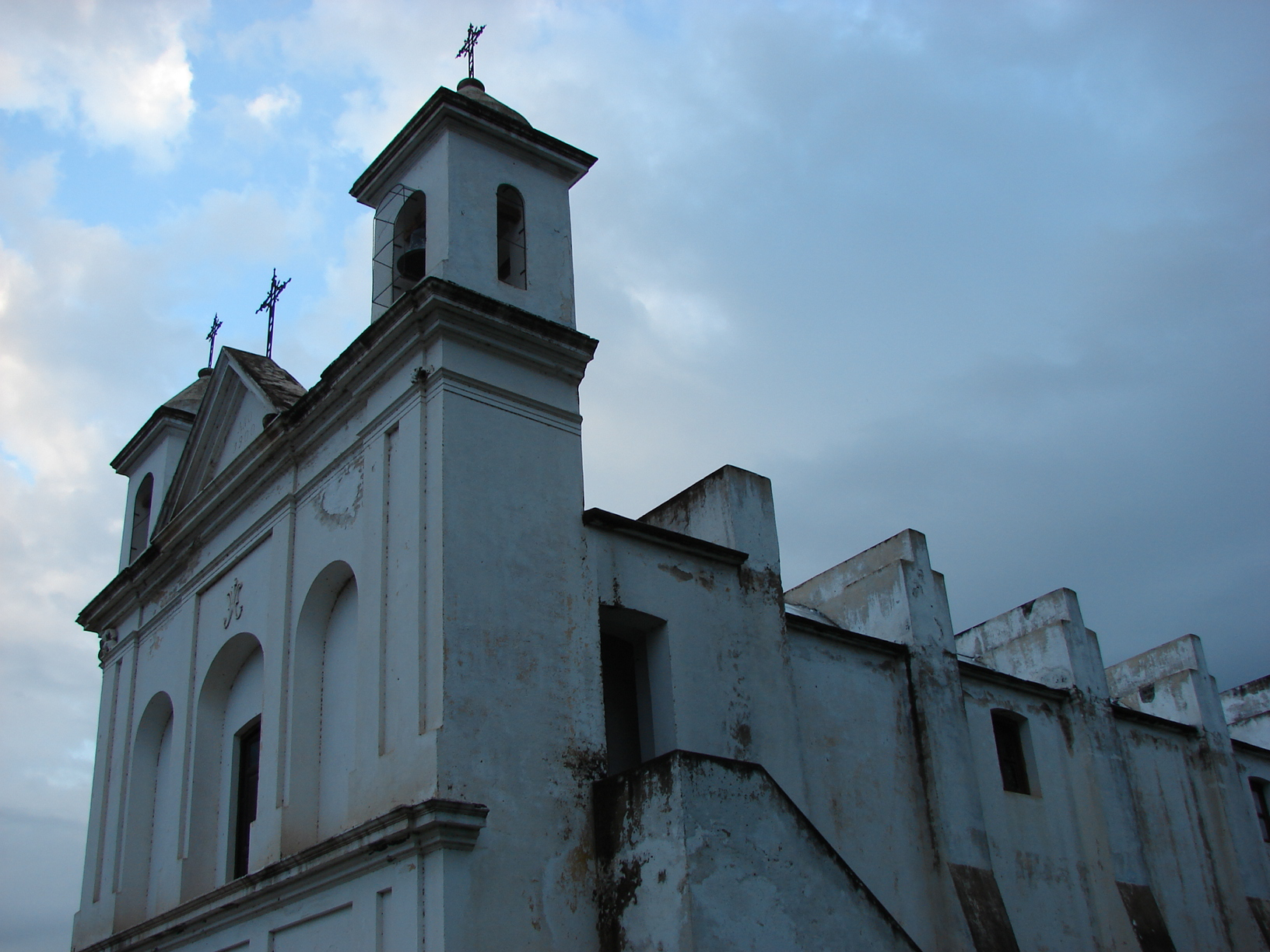

Amboy is a village and commune in the Calamuchita Department in the province of Córdoba, Argentina. It is located 115 km from the provincial capital in the Sierras de Córdoba region, 20 miles from Santa Rosa de Calamuchita, by Provincial Routes RP 5 and RP 23. It is located 602 meters above sea level and is crossed by the Amboy stream. It has a population of approximately 400 inhabitants (168 inhabitants according to the 2001 census). The village is sparsely populated with 26 per mile.

It was the birthplace of Dalmacio Vélez Sársfield (1800-1875).

The area has been used as a special stage for Rally Argentina.
