= Villa Aberastain =

- City
- Location of Aberastain in Argentina
- Coordinates: 31°39′S 68°35′W
- Country: Argentina
- Province: San Juan
- Department: Pocito

Population (2001 census)
  - Total: 8,946
- Time zone: UTC−3 (ART)
- CPA base: J5400
- Dialing code: +54 264

Villa Aberastain is an Argentine city of the province of San Juan, head of the department Pocito, and the headquarters of the municipal authorities of the department. Villa Aberastain is within the so-called Valley of Tulum, the main agricultural oasis in the province is concentrated and where 90% of the provincial population. The village is located about 15 kilometres from the low foothills of the Great St. John. National Route No. 40 passes a few kilometres east of the town and communicates with the provincial capital and the city of Mendoza.

The Sierra Chica de Zonda is located about four kilometres west. However, all the ejido of the town is settled in the alluvial plains formed east of the same.

== Economy ==
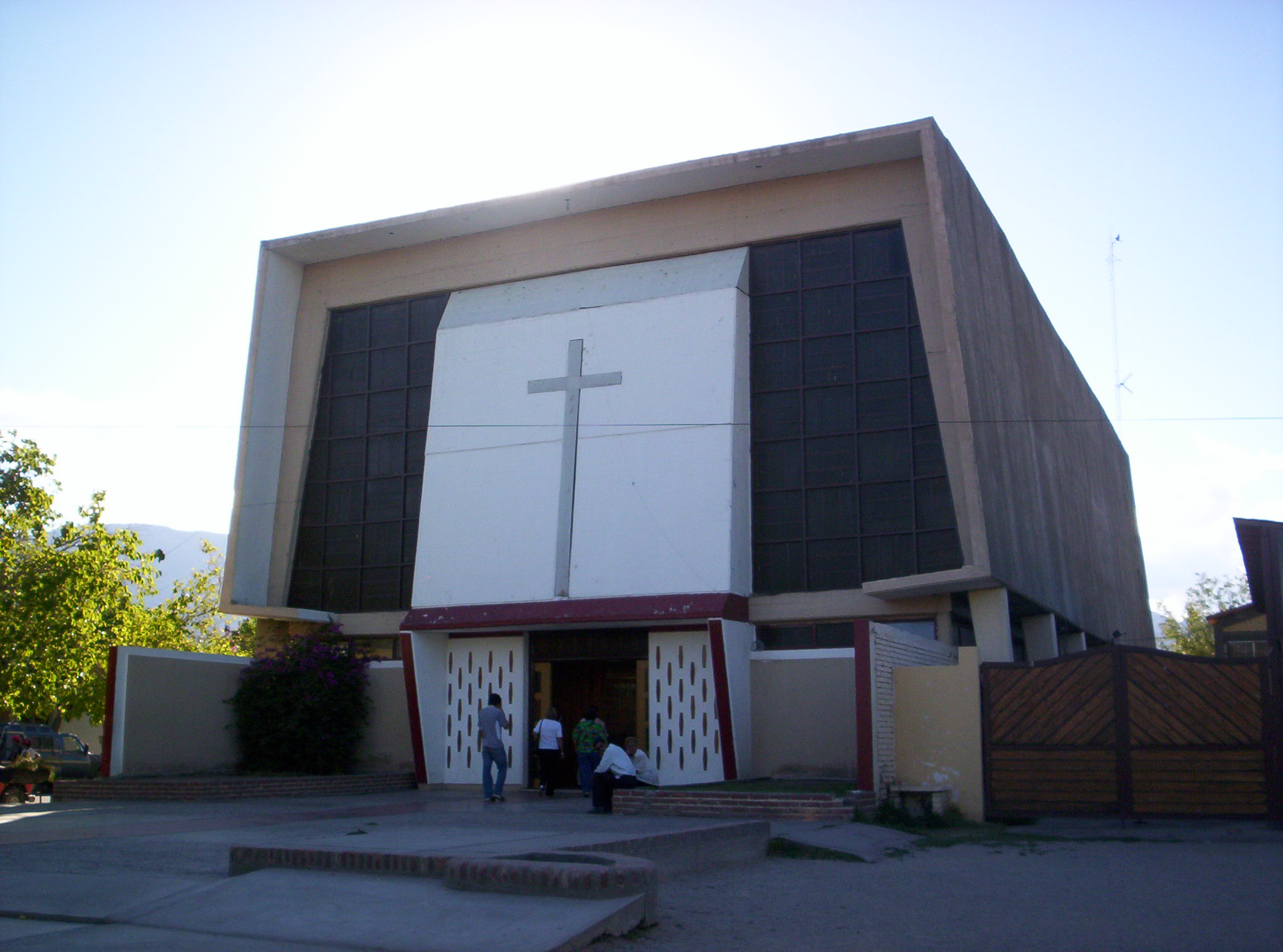
Sta.Barbara Churches

Being a city its economy is based on wine production and the cultivation of vegetables and fruit, with some industrialization of the same. These crops are possible because of irrigation caused by several different channels, including the most important is the channel Cespedes. Smallholding is the most widely practiced agriculture model.

== Population ==
It has 8,946 inhabitants (INDEC, 2001), which represents an increase of 36.0% compared with 6,578 inhabitants (INDEC, 1991) of the previous census. Villa Aberastain form a single urban agglomerate together with the nearby town of La Rinconada, called Aberastain - La Rinconada, whose population amounted to 11,879 inhabitants (INDEC, 2001), this magnitude puts his fourth agglomerate of the province.

== Urban Appearance ==
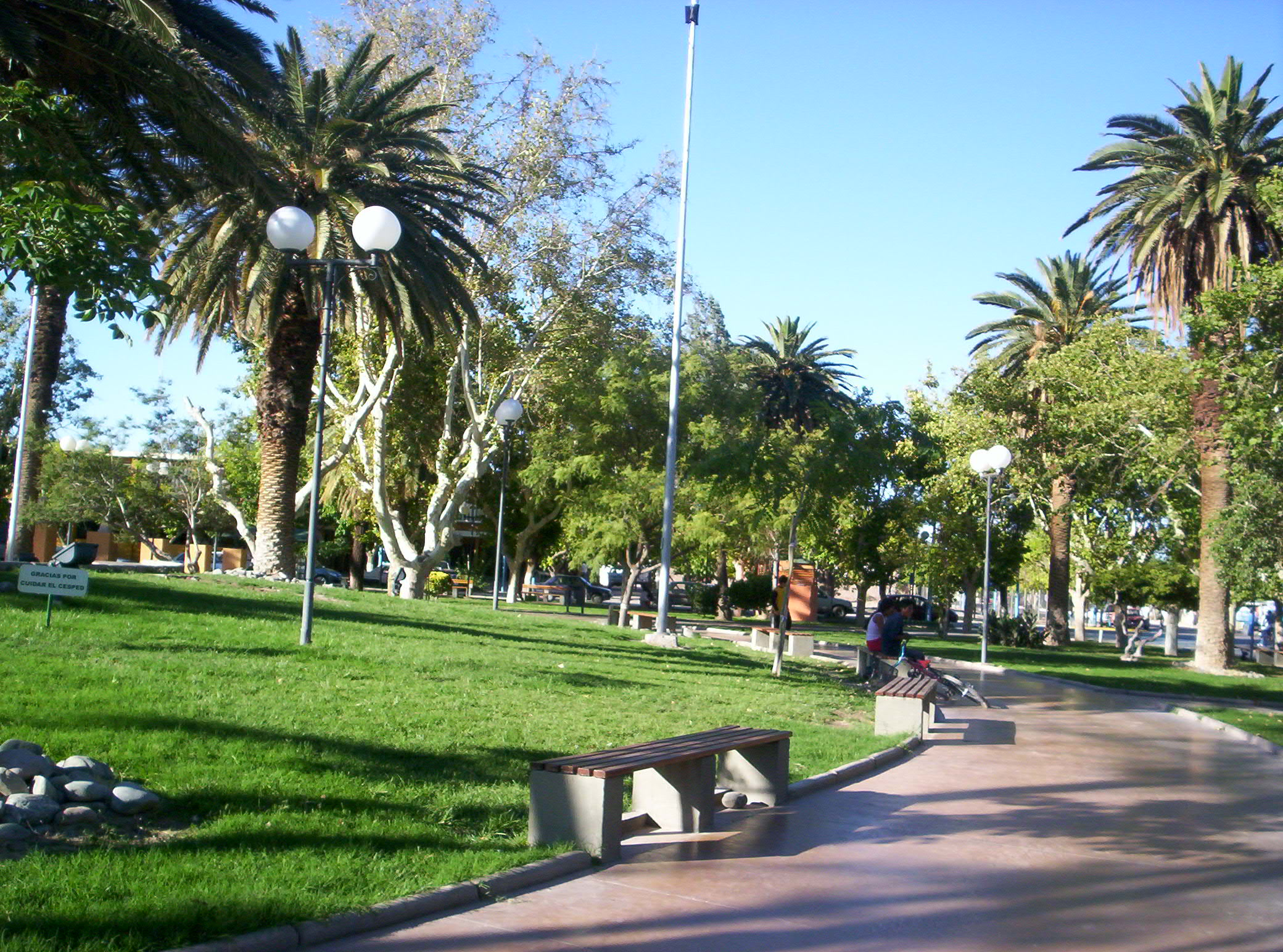
Freedom Square

The town has a modern appearance as all, that is well drawn and paved streets, wide sidewalks with mosaic floors and an expendida vegetation as banana trees, havens and mulberry which stood along the streets.

Antonino Aberastain here focuses more intensely commercial activity ofs and Marcos Avenue Zalasar or commonly called by pocitanos "Calle 11" has recently opened.

The town has in its main square with a replica of the Statue of Liberty four meters high. Similar donated by France to Buenos Aires on the occasion of the centenary celebrations of the May Revolution, but for reasons unclear this ended up being sent to this sanjuanina town.

- Freedom Square is the largest green space, was Refurbished recently making it a very picturesque site has a colorful vegetation, children's games and a variety of monuments such as the Mariana India (indigenous huarpe who lived in the vicinity) and Statue of Liberty.
- Parish Church: this has an architecture that most rare and different from any other church, is a "square" and very modern. Resguarda the image of the patron saint of the department is Santa Barbara, in the month of December was the patron saint festivities relazan
- City Hall: located off the main square, which is administered by the department by the mayor, also has a modern architecture and is in very good condition and is the headquarters of the Civil Registry.

== Transportation ==
Public transport in the town Villa Aberastain, consists of bus lines, whose lines are operated by companies one of which being Empresa Mayo. This company has lines connecting the town with the city of San Juan and other districts of the Pocito Department such as La Rinconada and Quinto Cuartel. Another company, Nuevo Sur, is responsible for connecting the Villa Aberastain with Village Media Agua. The company El Triunfo administers the line that connects the town with the District of Médano de Oro and Villa Krause. There are also some taxis circulating throughout the town.
