= Graffigna Winery =

Argentine wine company

Graffigna Winery and Vineyards
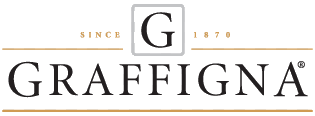

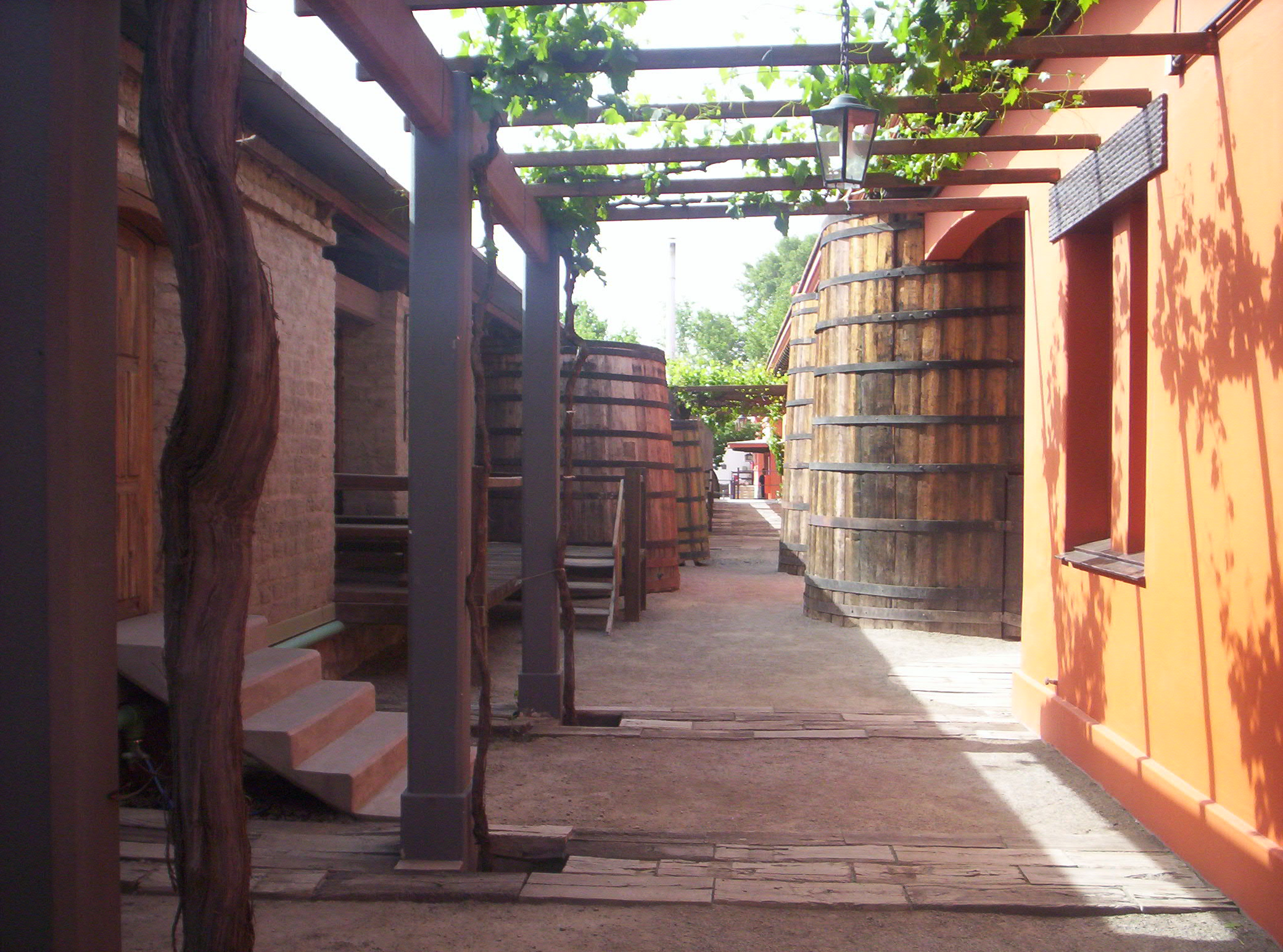
- Interior view of one of the courtyards of the Graffigna Museum.
- Type: Private
- Industry: Winemaking
- Founded: 1870
- Founder: Juan Graffigna
- Products: Wine
- Website: www.graffignawines.com

Bodega Graffigna is an Argentine wine company originally from the province of San Juan. It is a company with a long history in that province, founded by Italian (Genoese) immigrants. It owns vineyards located adjacent to the winery, as well as others in the departments of Pocito and Sarmiento. Graffigna is the oldest winery in San Juan and the third oldest in Argentina.

== History ==
In 1865, Don Juan Graffigna arrived in Argentina. This Italian immigrant not only brought with him extensive winemaking experience gained in his homeland, but also European grape varieties, which he introduced to Argentine soil—land with ideal conditions for grapevine cultivation. Later, Juan Graffigna invited his nephew, Santiago Graffigna, who was also an immigrant of the same origin. Santiago began winery operations in 1876. At that time, the business was still very small, particularly due to the lack of transportation options. White and red wines were produced using grapes of French origin generic wines that were sold in bulk. The first "fortified" wines also appeared; one of the earliest products was the port-style wine Don Santiago With the arrival of the railroad in the city of San Juan in 1885, progress followed.

== Museum ==
In November 2003, the Santiago Graffigna Museum was inaugurated. It was designed and constructed by architect Adriana Piastrellini to preserve the heritage and tradition of the winery's founders. In the "Patio de Cubas" at the Santiago Graffigna Museum, one of the most notable historical artifacts is a large oak cask with a capacity of 200,000 liters. Commissioned by Santiago Graffigna around 1900 and built in France, it was, at the time, the largest of its kind in South America. According to family accounts, in 1913, during Argentina's centennial celebrations, the interior of the barrel was used to host a lunch for approximately 70 guests before it was sealed for wine storage.
