= Villa Yacanto =

Town in Santa Rosa de Calamuchita, Córdoba, Argentina

Coordinates: 32°06′23″S 64°45′15″W

Villa Yacanto (also known as Villa Yacanto de Calamuchita) is a town in the department of Santa Rosa de Calamuchita. It is located in the province of Córdoba Province, Argentina.

== Images of Villa Yacanto ==
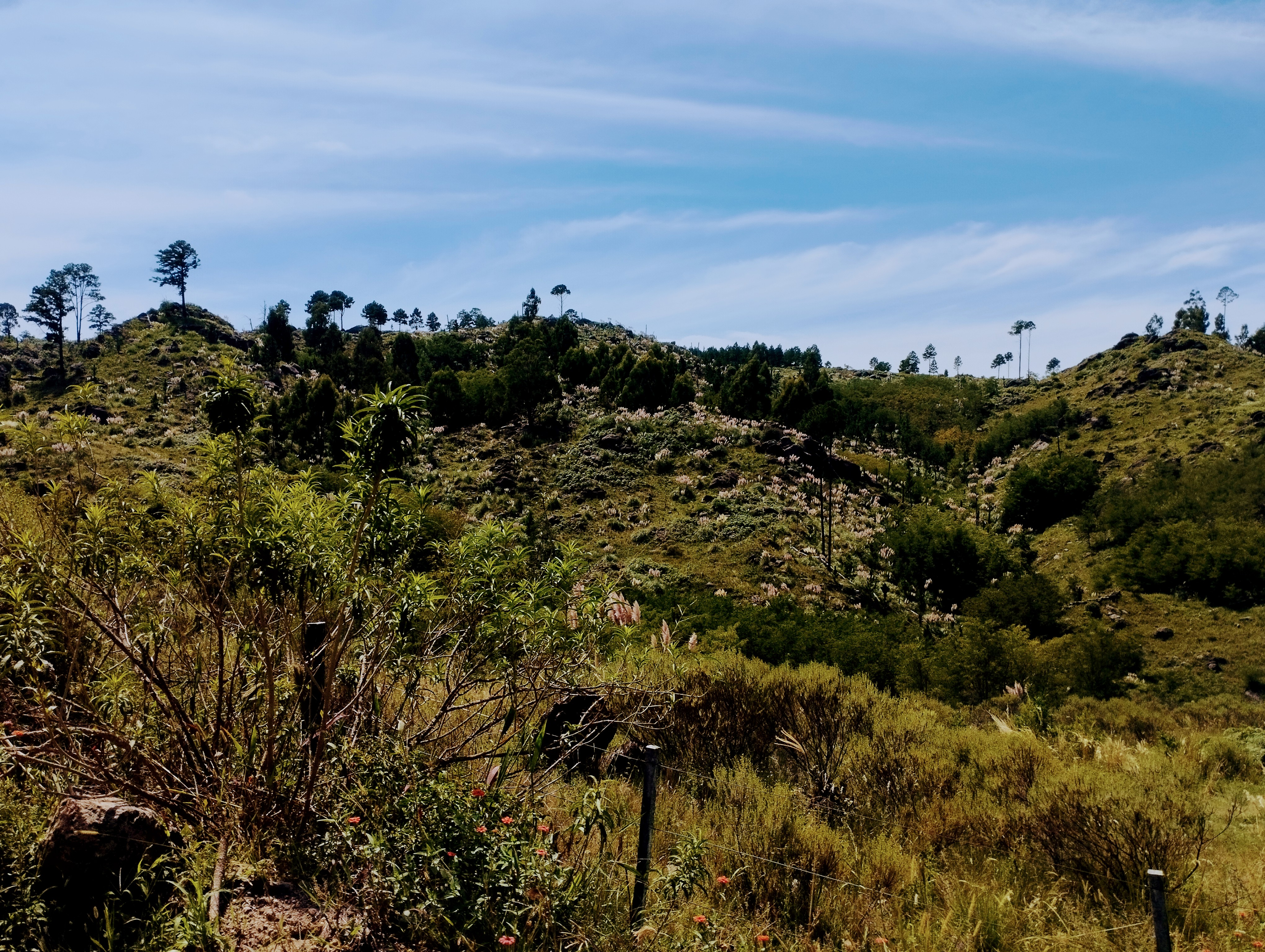

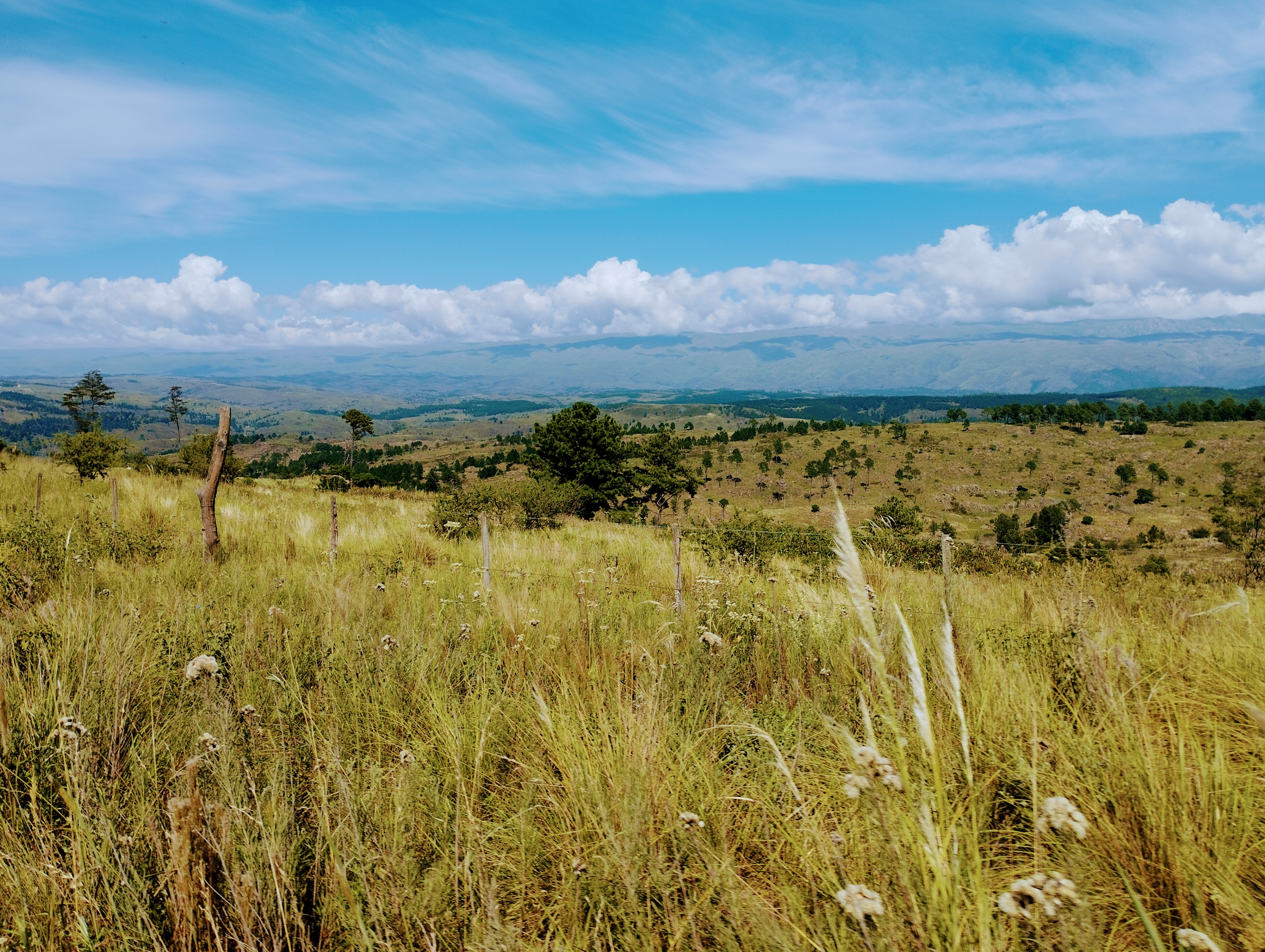

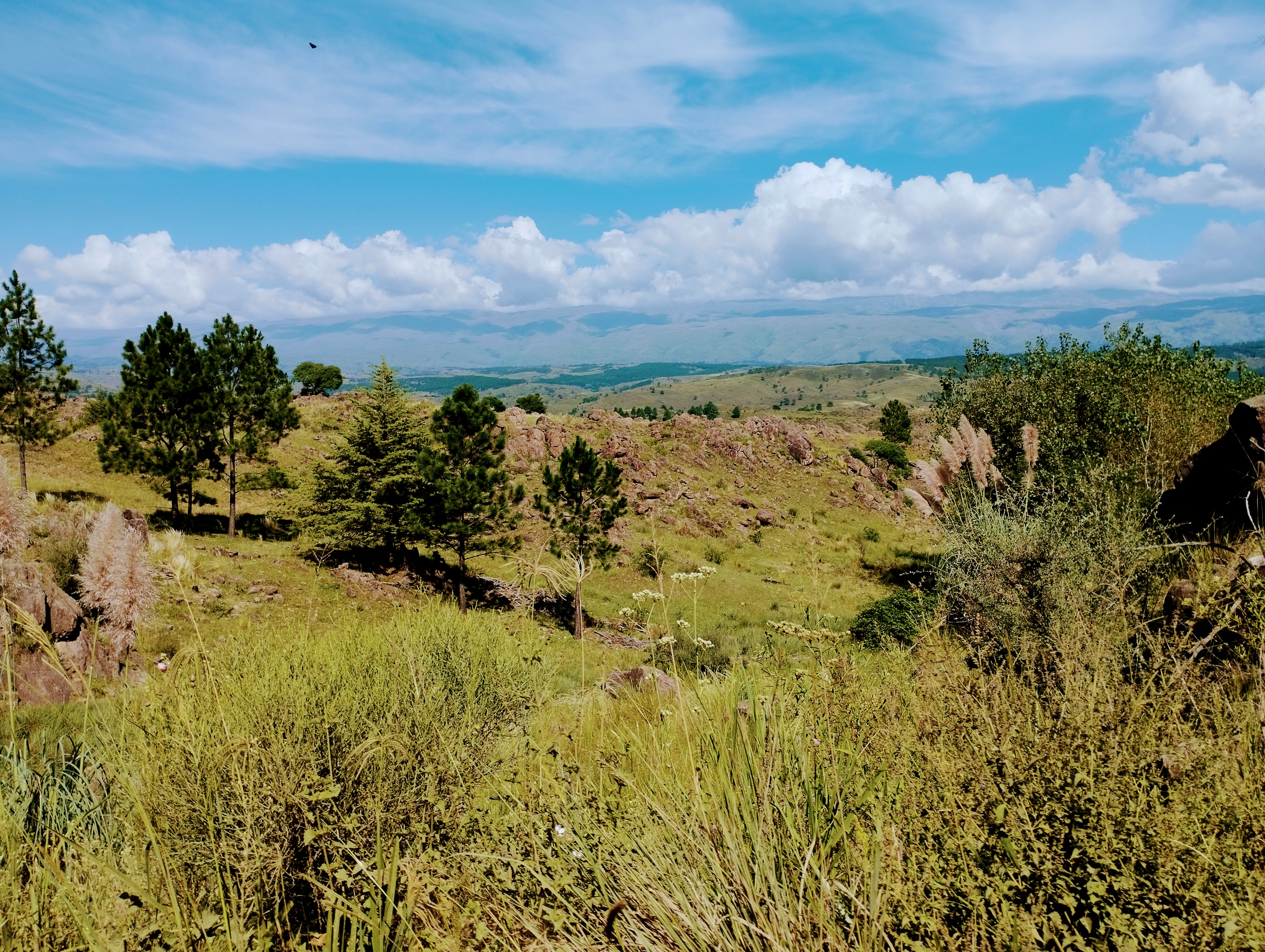
