= Media Agua =

- Town
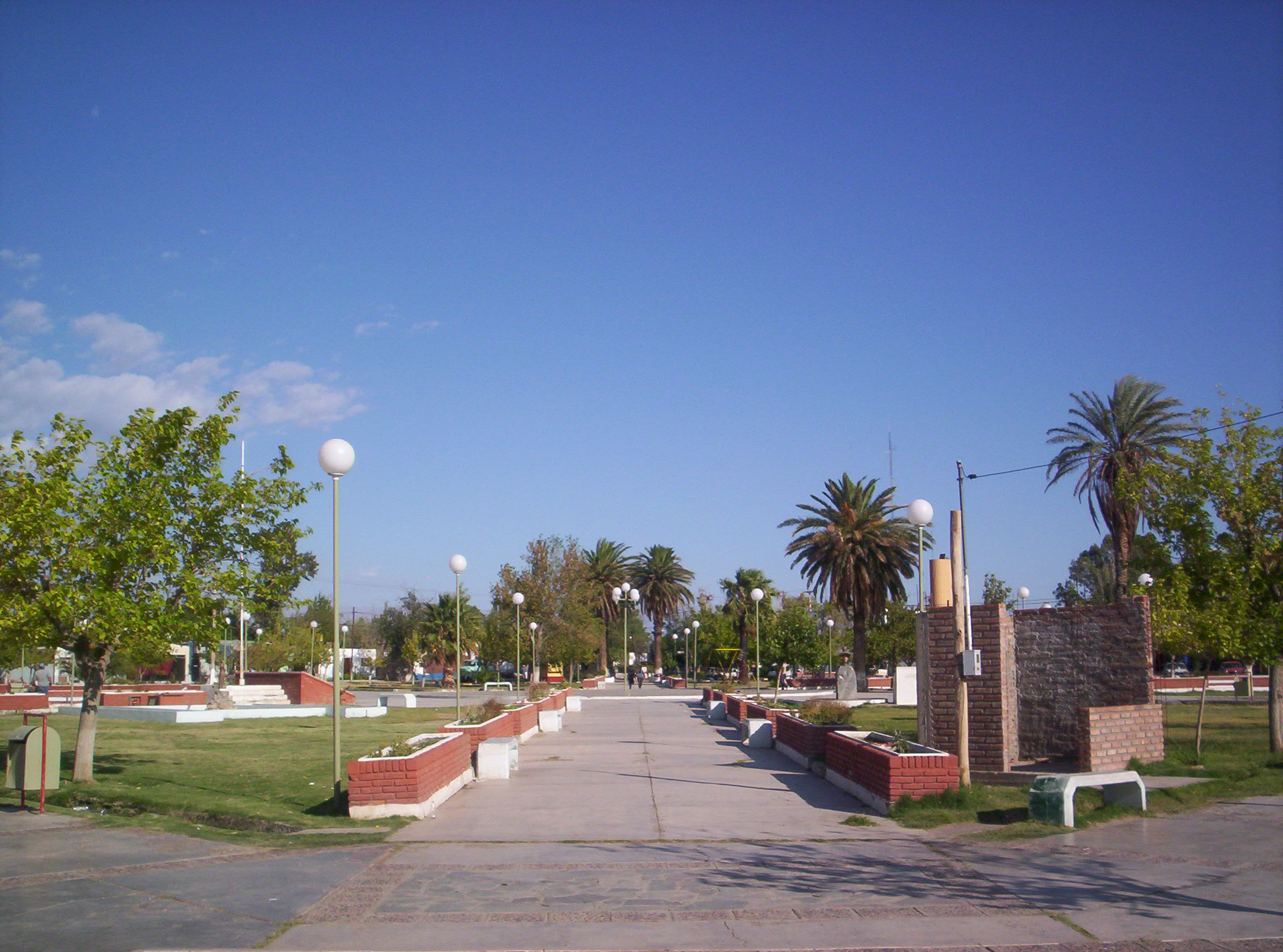
- Town square, Media Agua

- Location of Media Agua in Argentina Location of Media Agua in San Juan Province
- Coordinates: 31°59′S 68°26′W
- Country: Argentina
- Province: San Juan
- Department: Sarmiento

Population (2010)
  - Total: 7,983
- Time zone: UTC−3 (ART)
- CPA base: J5435
- Dialing code: +54 2647

Media Agua is a town in San Juan Province, Argentina. It is the headquarters of the municipal authorities of department Sarmiento and one of the more important towns in the southern San Juan area and within the Tulum Valley, the province's most agriculturally fertile region. Media Agua is the nucleus of a region of winemaking, horticulture, and mining.

== Population ==
Media Agua's population was 6,784 as of 2001, which represents an increase of 34.4% compared to 5,049 at the 1991 census. The majority of the population is located south while rural settlements predominate towards the north.

Media Agua has a modern appearance, with contemporary architecture, paved roads and street landscaping irrigated by small channels.

The fabric of the city develops in the form of a grid, or damero, which results in a perfect rectangle six blocks long by three blocks wide, with the most densely populated and commercially active areas at the center. It has mostly grown southward, where the town is divided into formal subdivisions, while winemaking and farming activities are concentrated to the north.

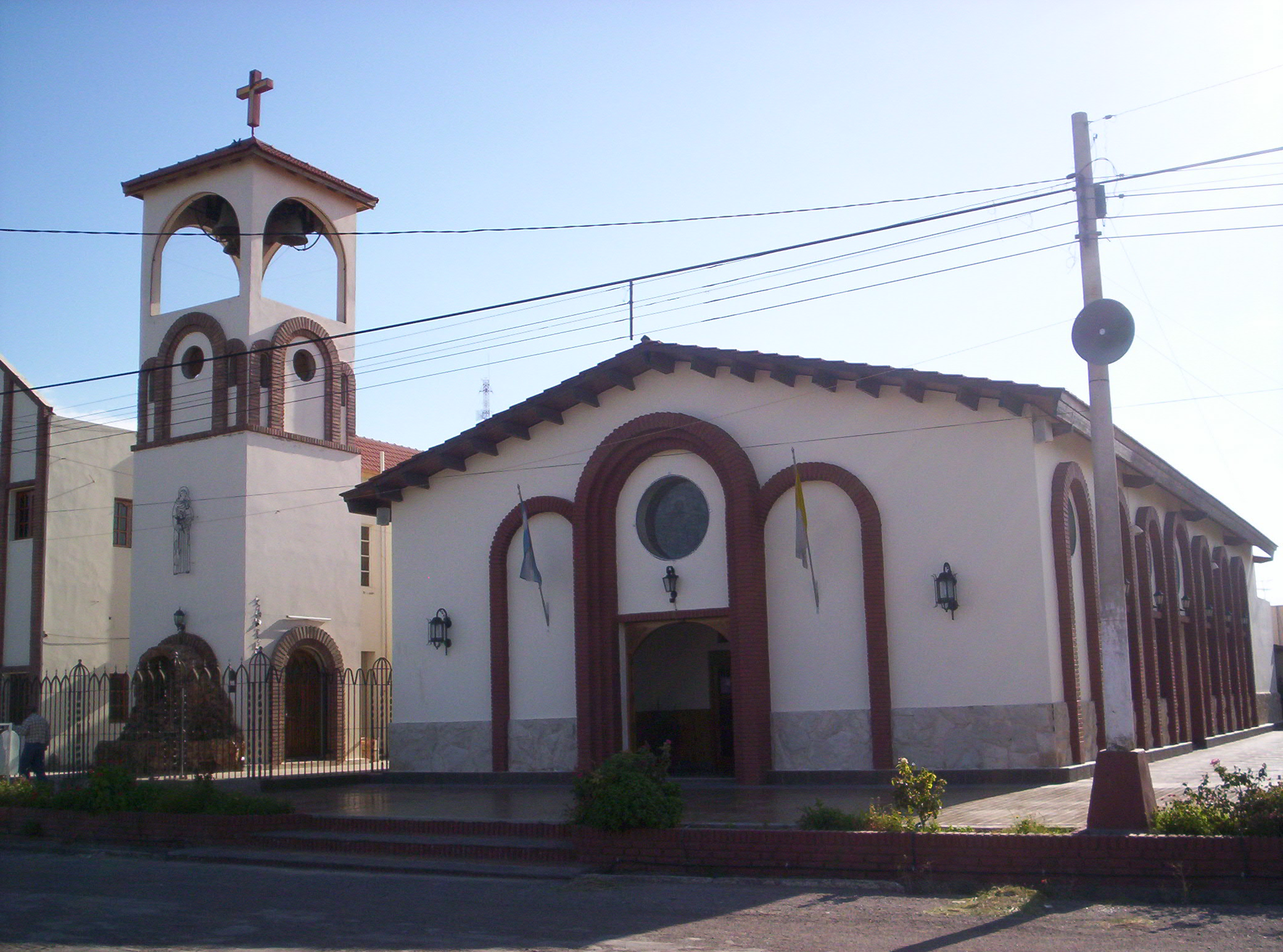
Church of San Antoni peneo de Padua
