= Chimbas Department =

Chimbas Departamento Chimbas
- Department
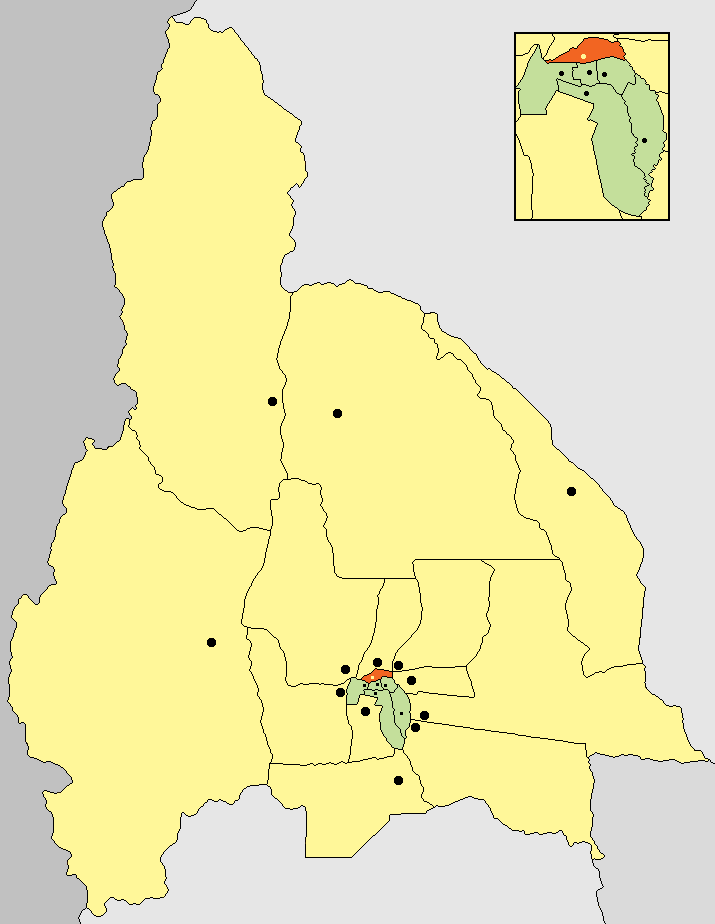
- location of Departamento Chimbas in San Juan Province
- Coordinates: 31°29′S 68°32′W
- Country: Argentina
- Seat: Villa Paula Albarracín de Sarmiento

Government
  - Intendant: Daniela Rodríguez

Area
  - Total: 62 km^{2} (24 sq mi)

Population (2001 census [INDEC])
  - Total: 73,829
  - Density: 1,200/km^{2} (3,100/sq mi)
- Demonym: chimbero/a
- Postal Code: 5400
- IFAM: SJU005
- Area Code: 0264
- Patron saint: Virgen de Andacollo

Chimbas is a department of the province of San Juan, Argentina. It is located on the south bank of the San Juan River, and is part of greater San Juan. The department is thoroughly urbanized and industrial.

== Origin of name ==
This name comes from the Basque language, and translates as "field outside the river" or "opposite side of the river."
