= Isca Yacu =

Coordinates: 27°01′50″S 64°36′42″W

Isca Yacu, located in northern Argentina, is a town in Jiménez Department, Santiago del Estero Province. Population (2010) 87. Postal code 4184.
