= Puiggari =

- Town
- Puiggari in Argentina
- Coordinates: 32.0548°S 60.4474°W
- Country: Argentina
- Province: Entre Ríos
- Department: Diamante
- Time zone: UTC−3 (ART)
- Website: www.puiggariweb.com.ar/en/ www.uap.edu.ar/en/

Puiggari is a small town in the Diamante department of Entre Ríos province in Argentina. It is about 250 kilometres (160 mi) northwest of Buenos Aires. There is an Adventist university as well as an Adventist fitness center with programs to help stop tobacco addiction. In 1898, an Adventist group of pioneers led by Pastor Francisco Westphal gave rise to Colegio adventista del Plata (Del Plata Adventist College). They taught six students nursing and theology.
