= Villa del Dique =

- Village
- Villa del Dique in Argentina
- Coordinates: 32.163°S 64.487°W
- Country: Argentina
- Province: Córdoba

Government
  - Intendant: Emiliano Torres
- Elevation: 552 m (1,811 ft)

Population (2001)
  - Total: 2,829
- Time zone: UTC−3 (ART)

Villa del Dique is located 110 kilometres (68 mi) in the southeast direction from Córdoba, Argentina, on the Ruta Provincial RP 51 at an altitude of 552 metres (1,811 ft). Its population was 2109 in 1997. In 2001 it had 2,829 inhabitants. The area has been used as a special stage in the 2014 Rally Argentina.
