= Villa Paula Albarracín de Sarmiento =

- Locality
- Location within San Juan Province Location within Argentina
- Coordinates: 31°29′35″S 68°31′55″W
- Country: Argentina
- Province: San Juan
- Department: Chimbas
- Elevation: 668 m (2,192 ft)

Population (2001)
  - Total: 1,157
- Time zone: UTC−3 (ART)

Villa Paula Albarracín de Sarmiento is a locality and the head town of the Chimbas Department, in the San Juan Province of Argentina. It is located in the northern sector of the urban agglomeration of Greater San Juan.

== Demographics ==
In the 2001 census, Villa Paula Albarracín de Sarmiento had a population of 1,157.
