= Embalse, Argentina =

Embalse
- Town
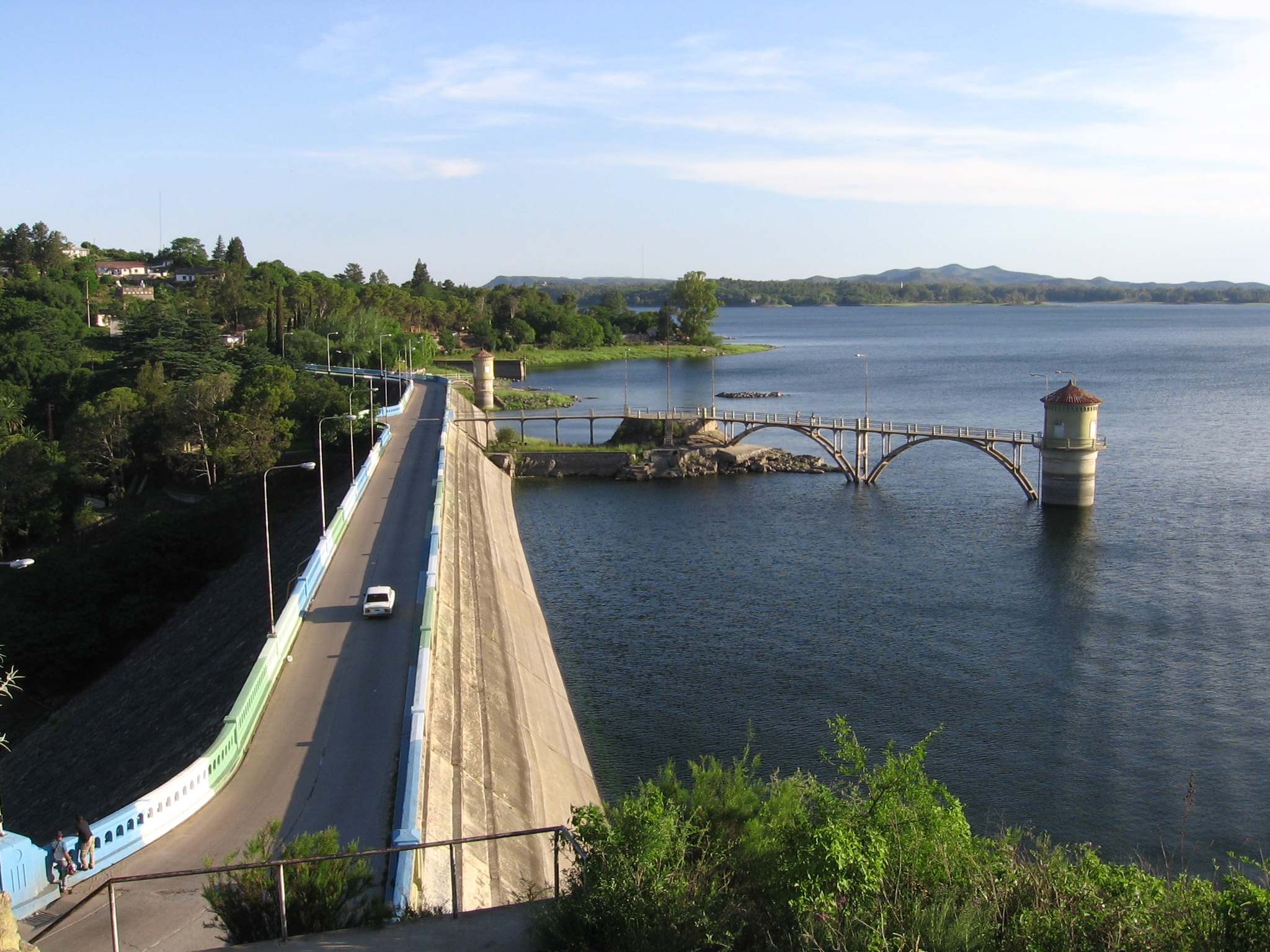
- The reservoir next to the city

- Location of Embalse in Argentina Embalse (Argentina)
- Coordinates: 32°11′S 64°25′W
- Country: Argentina
- Province: Córdoba
- Department: Calamuchita

Government
  - Intendant: Mario Rivarola (PJ)
- Elevation: 623 m (2,044 ft)

Population (2010 census)
  - Total: 8,793
- Time zone: UTC−3 (ART)
- CPA base: X5856
- Dialing code: +54 3571

Embalse is a city in the center-west of the province of Córdoba, Argentina, located within the Calamuchita Valley, 119 km south-southwest from Córdoba City. The municipality has 15,000 inhabitants as per the 2001 census [INDEC], though unofficial counts including the neighboring areas give a population of over 30,000, which grows by several thousands during the tourist high season.

The word embalse means "reservoir" (i. e. artificial lake) in Spanish. Embalse is located along the eastern shore of a large reservoir produced by the damming of the Río Tercero. The dam was inaugurated in 1930; it is 58 m high and 125 m long, with a maximum capacity of 730 million m³. The reservoir has an area of 58 km² and is employed for fishing, irrigation and the production of hydroelectricity, as well as water sports. On the southern shore lies the Embalse nuclear power plant, one of the two operational nuclear plants of Argentina (the other is Atucha I).

The area is of major touristic importance. Accordingly, Embalse has 7 hotels and many smaller accommodation facilities, and a casino (opened in 1984).
