= Santa Rosa de Calamuchita =

- Village
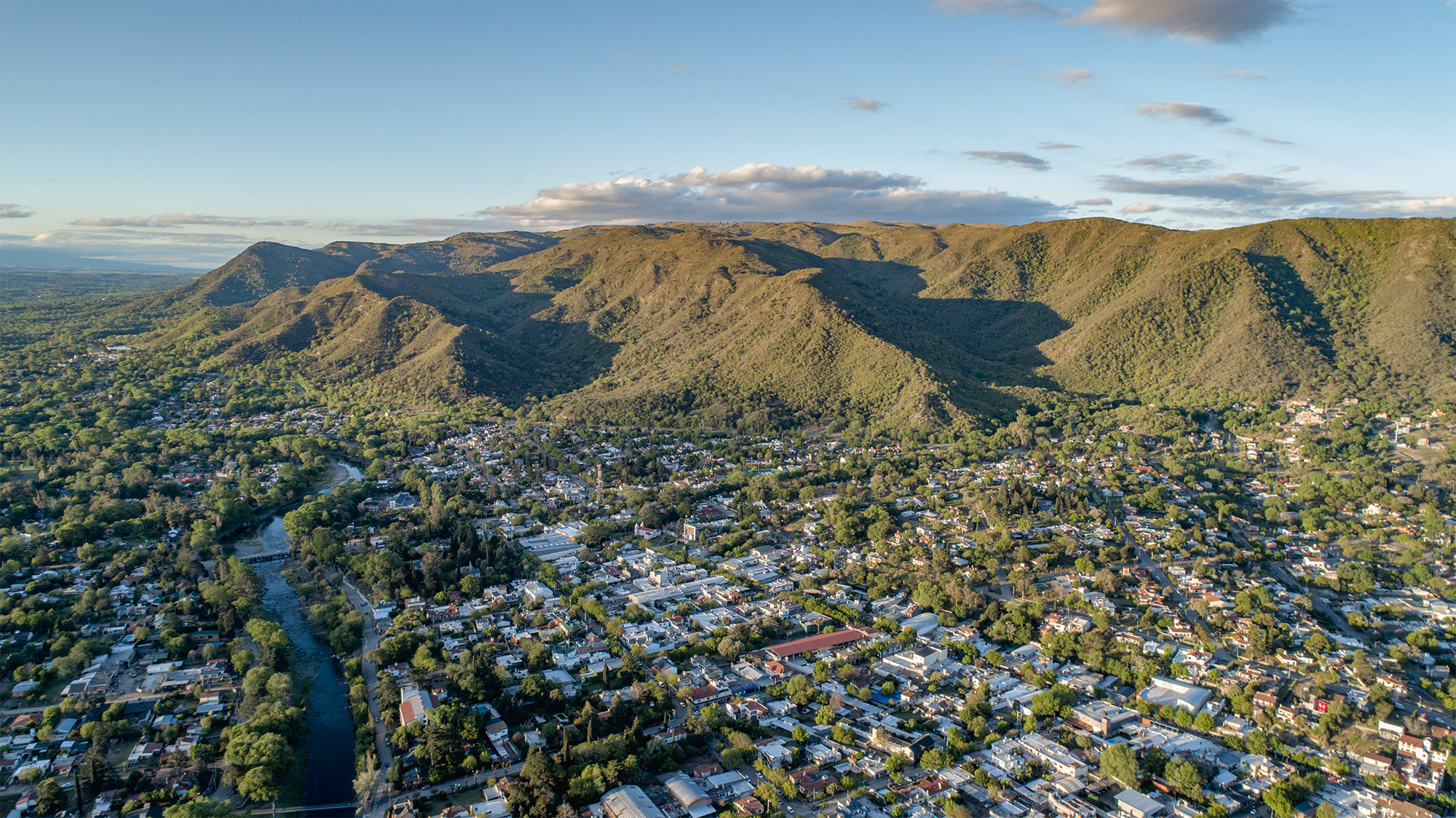

- Location of Santa Rosa de Calamuchita in Córdoba Province Location of Santa Rosa de Calamuchita in Argentina
- Coordinates: 32°04′S 64°32′W
- Country: Argentina
- Province: Córdoba
- Department: Calamuchita

Government
  - Intendant: Eduardo Martin

Population
  - Total: 9,504
- Time zone: UTC−3 (ART)
- CPA base: X5196
- Dialing code: +54 3546

Santa Rosa de Calamuchita is a small village in the province of Córdoba, Argentina. It had about 10,000 inhabitants at the 2001 census [INDEC]. The village is located in the central part of the Calamuchita Valley, surrounded by hills (the Sierras), rivers, and lakes, which makes the area a major tourist attraction. The village has a Mediterranean climate, characterized by warm summers with considerable rainfall, where temperatures can exceed 35°C, and cold, dry winters with minimum temperatures dropping below zero. Other important nearby towns in the Valley are Villa General Belgrano and Embalse (the latter is home to a nuclear power plant).
