= Gualeguaychú Department =

- Department
- Location of Gualeguaychú Department within Entre Ríos Province

- Location of Gualeguaychú in Argentina
- Coordinates: 33°1′S 58°31′W
- Country: Argentina
- Province: Entre Ríos
- Seat: Gualeguaychú

Area
  - Total: 7,086 km^{2} (2,736 sq mi)

Population (2022)
  - Total: 126,147
  - Density: 17.80/km^{2} (46.11/sq mi)
- Time zone: UTC-3 (ART)

The Gualeguaychú Department (in Spanish, Departamento Gualeguaychú) is an administrative subdivision (departamento) of the province of Entre Ríos, Argentina. It is located in the south-east of the province, beside the Uruguay River.

The department has 126,147 inhabitants as per the 2022 census [INDEC], which are distributed in 23 districts. The head town is Gualeguaychú (population 76,000). Other cities and towns are Aldea San Antonio, Larroque, Urdinarrain, Gilbert, Enrique Carbó, Pueblo General Belgrano, Irazusta, Costa Uruguay Norte, Aldea San Juan, Faustino M. Parera, General Almada, Las Mercedes, Cuchilla Redonda, Costa San Antonio, Rincón del Gato, Distrito Talitas, Alarcón, Estación Escriña, Costa Uruguay Sur, Pastor Britos, Perdices, and Rincón del Cinto.
