= Gualeguaychú =

Gualeguaychú may refer to:

- Gualeguaychú, Entre Ríos, a city in the province of Entre Ríos, Argentina
  - the Gualeguaychú meteorite of 1932, which fell in Entre Rios, Argentina (see meteorite fall)
- Gualeguaychú Airport, serving the city in Entre Ríos
- Gualeguaychú Department, an administrative subdivision (departamento) of the province of Entre Ríos, Argentina
- Gualeguaychú River, a river in the province of Entre Ríos, Argentina
