= Evangelical Congregational Church in Argentina =

The Evangelical Congregational Church in Argentina (Spanish: Iglesia Evangélica Congregacional Argentina) is a Reformed and Congregational denomination in Argentina, established by European immigrants in the early 1900s.

== History ==
The Evangelical Congregational Church in Argentina was founded in 1922 in Concordia and San Antonio village in the Province of Entre Rios. After the Russian revolution in 1917, German people from Volga region immigrated to Argentina. The Germans begun to gather in the school hall in San Antonio village, under the leadership of Jorge Geier. These families' religious background was mostly pietistic Reformed, therefore they wanted to establish a new denomination. The first name of this nascent congregation was Evangelical Free Congregation in San Antonio, later it was renamed the German Evangelical Religious Society. They couldn't adjust themselves to the government of the Lutheran churches, they asked the Congregationalist churches in the USA to help them. First ordained pastor was Carlos Holzer was sent by the congregational church in the United States. On June 24, 1924 the congregation adopted the name Evangelical Congregational Church in Argentina. This church expanded and congregations in Irazusta, Urdinarrain, Villa Mantero, Almada and Costa San Antonio was launched.

There are the following provinces that the congregational church are present: Entre Rios, Misiones, Chaco, Formosa, Cordoba, Buenos Aires, and Santa Fe. The Evangelical Congregational Church is rich in history and is quickly growing.

== Statistics ==
In 2004, the denomination had 20,000 members in 130 congregations and 30 house fellowships, and adheres to the Heidelberg Catechism along with Luthers Small Catechism. It is a member of the World Communion of Reformed Churches.
