= Carolina Gaillard =

Argentine politician

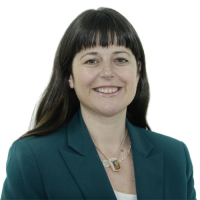

National Deputy
- Incumbent
- Assumed office 19 December 2019
- Constituency: Entre Ríos
- In office 10 December 2013 – 10 December 2017
- Constituency: Entre Ríos

Personal details
- Born: 10 December 1981 (age 44) General Campos, Argentina
- Party: Justicialist Party
- Other political affiliations: Front for Victory (2007–2017); Unidad Ciudadana (2017–2019); Frente de Todos (2019–present)
- Education: University of Buenos Aires

Ana Carolina Gaillard (born 10 December 1981) is an Argentine politician, currently serving as National Deputy elected in Entre Ríos Province. Having originally run in 2017, she took office on 19 December 2019, following the resignation Juan José Bahillo. She previously served as deputy from 2013 to 2017. A member of the Justicialist Party, Gaillard sits in the Frente de Todos bloc.

== Early and personal life ==
Gaillard was born on 10 December 1981 in General Campos, a small town in the San Salvador Department of Entre Ríos Province. She studied law at the University of Buenos Aires, and has a master's degree in Public Policy from the same university.

She is in a relationship with former Justicialist Party deputy for Buenos Aires Province, Nicolás Rodríguez Saá, with whom she has a son, Felipe, born in 2020.

== Political career ==
Gaillard became involved with student politics as a law student in the University of Buenos Aires. She served as a parliamentary secretary and legislative aide at the National Congress from 2007 to 2011.

In the 2009 legislative election, she ran for a seat in the Argentine Chamber of Deputies as the tenth candidate in the Front for Victory list in Buenos Aires; the list received 11.61% of the popular vote, and Gaillard was not elected. In 2011, she was appointed Director of the Casa de Entre Ríos, the "cultural embassy" of Entre Ríos Province in Buenos Aires.

=== National deputy ===
Ahead of the 2013 legislative election, Gaillard was nominated as the second candidate in the Front for Victory list to the Chamber of Deputies, behind José Eduardo Lauritto. The list was the most voted in the province, with 46.65% of the vote, and Gaillard was elected. Gaillard ran for re-election in 2017, as the fourth candidate in the Frente Justicialista Somos Entre Ríos list, but the list did not receive enough votes for Gaillard to be re-elected.

During her absence from Congress, Gaillard was Secretary of Tourism and Culture of Entre Ríos Province.

She took office as deputy again on 19 December 2019, following the resignation of Juan José Bahillo from the Chamber to become a minister in the Entre Ríos provincial government. She formed part of the Frente de Todos bloc.

As deputy, Gaillard was a supporter of the legalization of abortion in Argentina, and voted in favor of the 2020 Voluntary Interruption of Pregnancy bill, which passed the Chamber. In response to her support for the bill, anti-abortion protesters targeted her family's bakery in General Campos.

Ahead of the 2021 primary election, Gaillard was confirmed as one of the candidates for re-election in the Frente de Todos list in Entre Ríos. With 31.63% of the vote, the FDT list received enough votes for Gaillard to be re-elected.
