= Aranguren (disambiguation) =

The name Aranguren may make reference to

== Places ==
- Aranguren, town in Spain
- Aranguren, Argentina, municipality in Argentina

== People ==
- Eulogio Aranguren, Argentine soccer player
- Francisco Gárate Aranguren, Spanish jesuit
- Gonzalo Parra-Aranguren, Venezuelan judge at The Hague
- Jesús Aranguren, Spanish soccer player
- José Aranguren, Spanish general
- José Julián de Aranguren, Spanish archbishop
- Juan-Martín Aranguren, Argentine tennis player
- Juan José Aranguren, Argentine minister of energy
- Sotero Aranguren, Argentine soccer player
- José Luis López Aranguren, Spanish philosopher
