= San Salvador Department, Entre Ríos =

San Salvador Department Departamento San Salvador
- Department
- Location of San Salvador Department within Entre Ríos Province

- Location of San Salvador in Argentina
- Coordinates: 31°37′S 58°40′W
- Country: Argentina
- Province: Entre Ríos
- Seat: San Salvador

Area
  - Total: 1,282 km^{2} (495 sq mi)

Population (2022)
  - Total: 20,854
  - Density: 16.27/km^{2} (42.13/sq mi)
- Time zone: UTC-3 (ART)

The San Salvador Department (in Spanish, Departamento San Salvador) is an administrative subdivision (departamento) of Entre Ríos Province, Argentina, created in 1995. It is located in the center-east of the province.

The department has 20,854 inhabitants as per the 2022 census [INDEC], which are distributed in 4 districts. The head town is San Salvador, which has a population of 13,228. Other towns are General Campos, Colonia Baylina, San Ernesto and Walter Moss.
