= Bruno Urribarri =

Argentine footballer

Personal information
- Full name: Bruno Urribarri
- Date of birth: November 6, 1986 (age 40)
- Place of birth: General Campos, Argentina
- Height: 1.63 m (5 ft 4 in)
- Position: Left-back

Youth career
- Boca Juniors

Senior career*
Years	Team	Apps	(Gls)
2006–2007	Boca Juniors	10	(0)
2008	Argentinos Juniors	0	(0)
2008–2011	Asteras Tripolis	58	(0)
2011–2014	Colón	76	(1)
2014–2015	River Plate	3	(0)
2015–2016	Atlético Rafaela	12	(0)
2016–2017	Tigre	10	(0)
2017–2021	Patronato	48	(0)
- * Club domestic league appearances and goals

Bruno Urribarri (born November 6, 1986, in General Campos) is a retired Argentine football player, who played as a left-back.

His father, Sergio Urribarri, was elected Governor of Entre Ríos Province in 2007, and re-elected in 2011.

== Honours ==
River Plate

- Copa Sudamericana: 2014
- Copa Libertadores: 2015
