= Urdinarrain =

- City
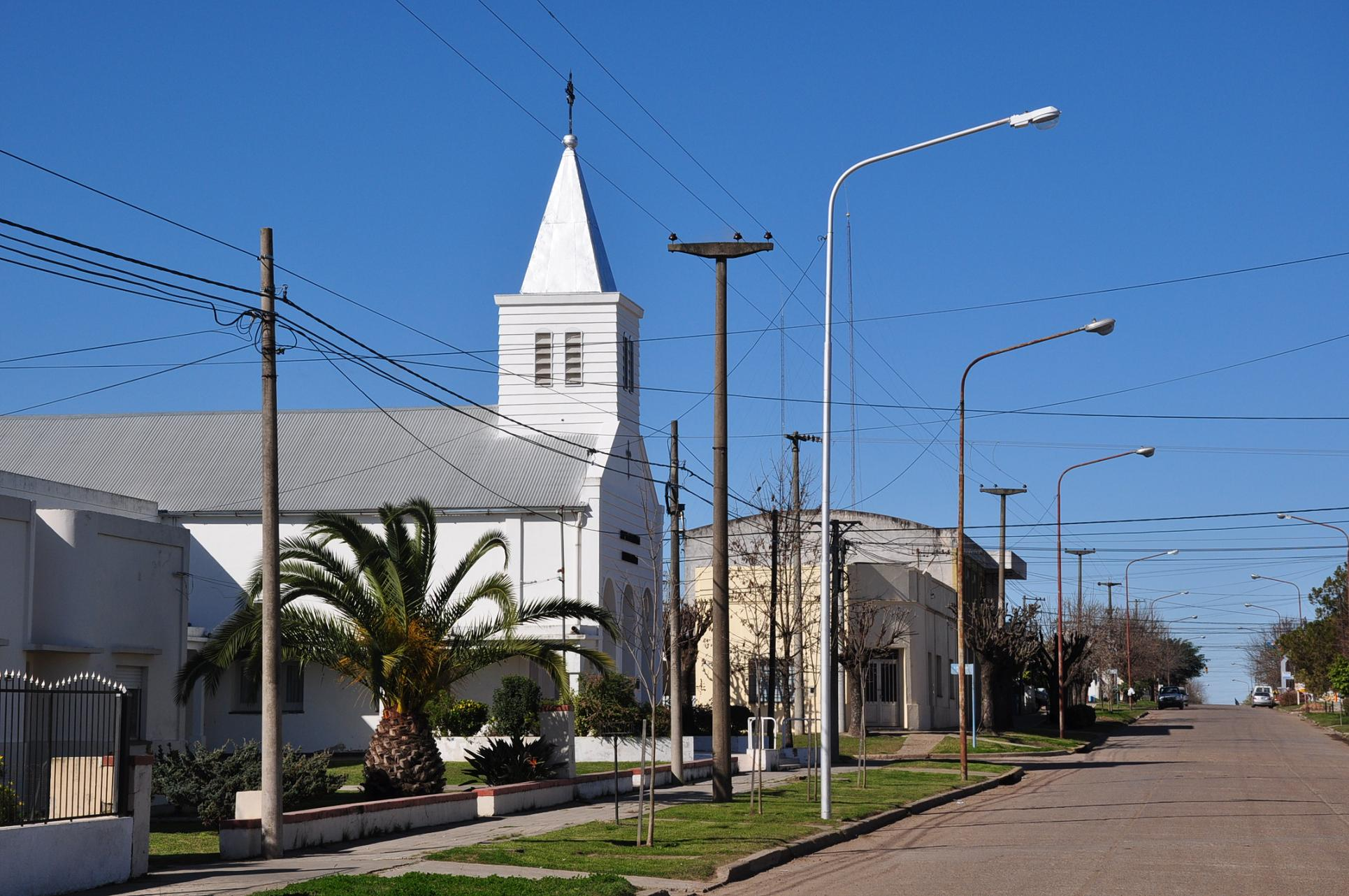

- Location of Urdinarrain in Argentina
- Coordinates: 32°41′08″S 58°53′12″W
- Country: Argentina
- Province: Entre Ríos
- Department: Gualeguaychú

Population (2010 census)
  - Total: 8,986
- Time zone: UTC−3 (ART)
- CPA base: E2826
- Dialing code: +54 3446

Urdinarrain is a city in the center-south of the province of Entre Ríos, Argentina, 240 km southeast from the provincial capital Paraná and 40 km west from Gualeguaychú, on Provincial Route 20. It has 8,986 inhabitants as per the 2010 census [INDEC].

The original small settlement was populated by numerous newcomers, mostly European immigrants, after the arrival of the railway line on 23 September 1890. It was declared a first-category municipality on 21 August 1942. The current name of the city is a homage to General Manuel Antonio Urdinarrain (1801–1868), who fought alongside local caudillos Francisco Ramírez and Justo José de Urquiza.
