= Mantero (surname) =

Mantero is a surname.

- Manuel Mantero (born 1930), Spanish professor
- Matteo Mantero (born 1974), Italian politician
- Vera Mantero (born 1966), Portuguese dancer and choreographer

== See also ==
- Villa Mantero
- Montero (name)
