= Don Cristóbal Primero =

Coordinates: 32°09′52″S 59°48′44″W

- Municipality and village
- Interactive map of Don Cristóbal Primero
- Country: Argentina
- Province: Entre Ríos Province
- Time zone: UTC−3 (ART)

Don Cristóbal Primero is a village and municipality in Entre Ríos Province in north-eastern Argentina.
