= Rincón del Gato =

- Municipality and village
- Coordinates: 32°37′55″S 58°34′44″W
- Country: Argentina
- Province: Entre Ríos Province

Population (2010)
  - Total: 36
- Time zone: UTC−3 (ART)

Rincón del Gato is a village and municipality in Entre Ríos Province in north-eastern Argentina. It was not considered a location in 1991 and 2001 census, and its population was of 60 inhabitants in 2001.
