= Center Region, Argentina =

Region of Argentina

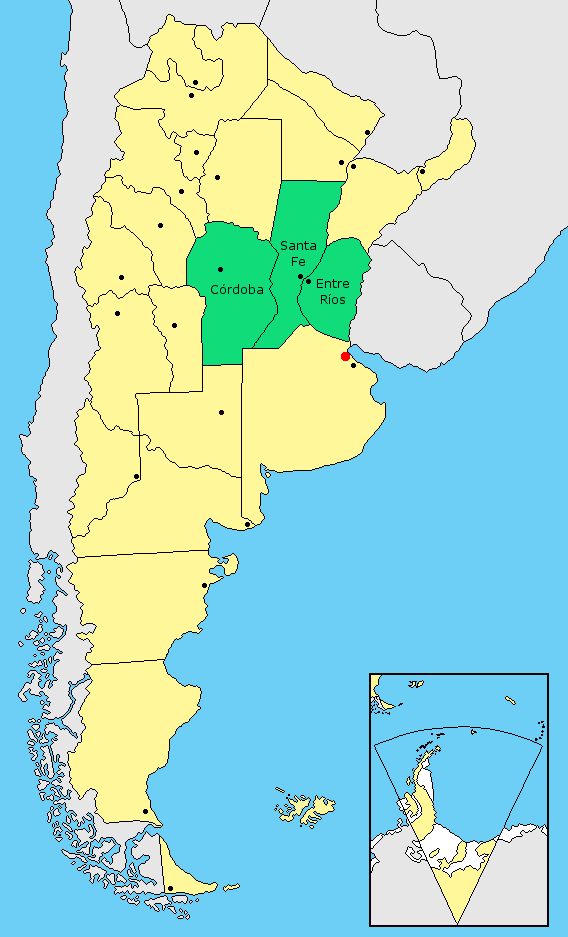
Map of the Center Region (in green)

The Center Region of Argentina (in Spanish, Región Centro) is the political and economical association of the provinces of Córdoba, Santa Fe and Entre Ríos. The legal framework for this kind of regional association, the first and only in the country, is Article 124 of the Argentine Constitution.

These three provinces, located along the central and central-east part of the country, have a total population of 8,961,932 (2022 census [INDEC]) and an area of 377,109 km^{2}, being large enough to function as an operative unit in the international economy. The Center Region is notable for producing various goods that supply the rest of the country; it concentrates the country's whole production of peanuts, 90% of vegetable oil, 70% of milk, 53% of grain, slightly over half of poultry and third of livestock as well as 70% of its agricultural machinery.

== Origin ==
On 15 November 1973 an Intention Letter was signed by the governors of the three provinces (Carlos Sylvestre Begnis, Ricardo Obregón Cano and Juan Cresto), acknowledging their political interest in joining. The project, however, did not progress until 9 May 1998, when Ramón Mestre (governor of Córdoba) and Jorge Obeid (governor of Santa Fe) issued a joint declaration.

The Center Region (La Región Central) was officially formed by Córdoba and Santa Fe by a treaty signed on 15 August 1998. Entre Ríos adhered to the treaty on 6 April 1999.

== Organization ==
The Center Region is administered by four main organisms:

- Governors' Committee (Junta de Gobernadores): It is formed by the governors of the members provinces, in command of the political management of the integration process and the actions needed to reach the goals set for the Region.
- Executive Committee (Comité Ejecutivo): It is in charge of implementing and executing the consensual policies of the Governors' Committee. Formed by the ministers and other top-rank officials of the different areas of each provincial administrations (secretaries, heads of independent state organizations, etc.), or representatives thereof appointed by the provinces. The committee is led by an executive board made up of one representative of each province.
- Administrative Secretariat (Secretaría Administrativa): It coordinates the technical and administrative business of the Region, executes the actions commanded by the Governors' Committee and the executive committee, insures the fulfilling of the compromises derived from the foundational treaties and other norms, and assists the other organs of the Region technically and logistically.
- Joint Parliamentary Commission (Comisión Parlamentaria Conjunta): A group of four permanent internal commissions (Economy and Production; Infrastructure and Services; General Legislation; and Institutional and Municipal/Communal Affairs).
