= Rincón del Cinto =

Coordinates: 32°37′55″S 58°34′44″W

- Municipality and village
- Interactive map of Rincón del Cinto
- Country: Argentina
- Province: Entre Ríos Province
- Time zone: UTC−3 (ART)

Rincón del Cinto is a village and municipality in Entre Ríos Province in north-eastern Argentina.
