= Federal Department =

Federal Departamento Federal
- Department
- Location of Federal Department within Entre Ríos Province

- Location of Federal in Argentina
- Coordinates: 30°57′S 58°46′W
- Country: Argentina
- Province: Entre Ríos Province
- Seat: Federal

Area
  - Total: 5,060 km^{2} (1,950 sq mi)

Population (2022)
  - Total: 29,667
  - Density: 5.86/km^{2} (15.2/sq mi)

Federal is a department of Entre Ríos Province, Argentina.
