= Federal, Entre Ríos =

Federal
- City
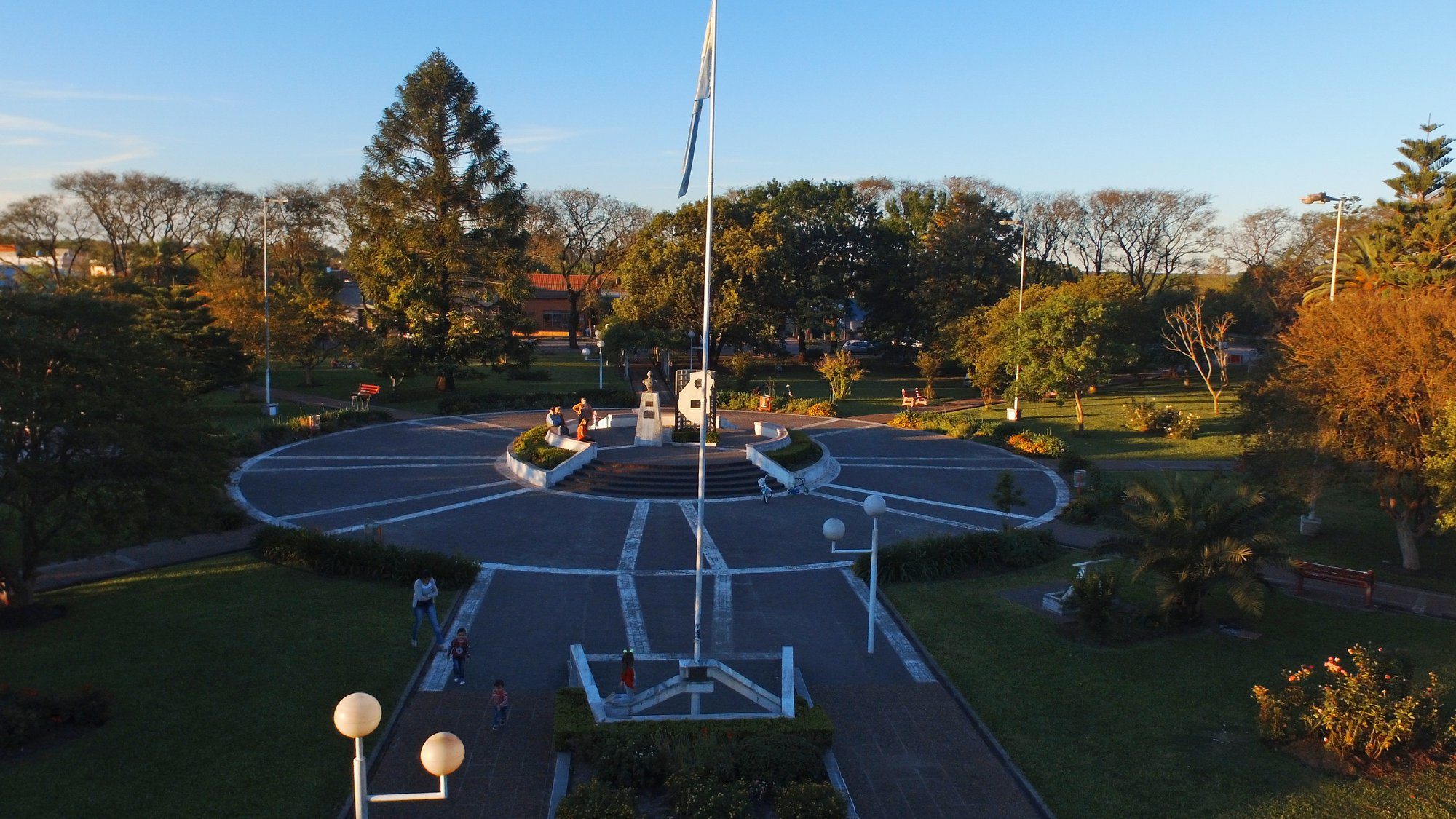

- Location of Federal in Argentina
- Coordinates: 30°57′S 58°48′W
- Country: Argentina
- Province: Entre Ríos
- Department: Federal

Population (2010 census)
  - Total: 16,075
- Time zone: UTC−3 (ART)
- CPA base: E3180
- Dialing code: +54 3454

Federal is a city in the province of Entre Ríos, Argentina. It had 16,075 inhabitants per the 2010 census [INDEC], and is the head town of the Federal Department. It lies in the center-north of the province, by National Route 127, about 190 km northeast of the provincial capital Paraná.

The basis of the local economy is the production of citrus and crops of wheat and soybean. The city has hosted the annual National Festival of Chamamé since 1976.

The town was officially founded on 7 September 1880 by provincial governor José Francisco Antelo. The creation and shaping of the first institutions of this settlement was due to a Spanish immigrant, Antonio Flores.

Federal is the exact antipode of the Chinese city of Shanghai, the third most populous city in the world.
