= Puntas del Gualeguaychú =

Coordinates: 31°49′S 58°36′W

- Municipality and village
- Interactive map of Puntas del Gualeguaychú
- Country: Argentina
- Province: Entre Ríos Province
- Time zone: UTC−3 (ART)

Puntas del Gualeguaychú is a village and municipality in Entre Ríos Province in north-eastern Argentina.
