= Colonia Oficial No. 5 =

Coordinates: 31°34′30″S 58°22′54″W

Colonia Oficial Nº 5
- Municipality and village
- Interactive map of Colonia Oficial Nº 5
- Country: Argentina
- Province: Entre Ríos Province
- Time zone: UTC−3 (ART)

Colonia Oficial Nº 5 is a village and municipality in Entre Ríos Province in north-eastern Argentina.
