= Paso de la Arena, Entre Ríos =

Coordinates: 31°45′S 60°10′W

Paso de la Arena
- Municipality and village
- Interactive map of Paso de la Arena
- Country: Argentina
- Province: Entre Ríos Province
- Time zone: UTC−3 (ART)

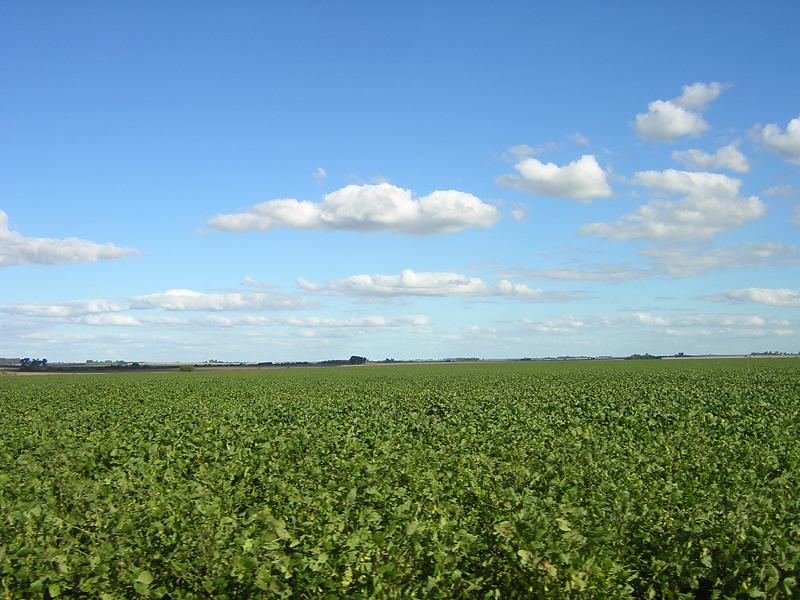
Soybean field in Paso de La Arena, Argentina

Paso de la Arena is a village and municipality in Entre Ríos Province in north-eastern Argentina.
