= Gualeguaychú River =

River in Argentina

Coordinates: 33°5′S 58°25′W

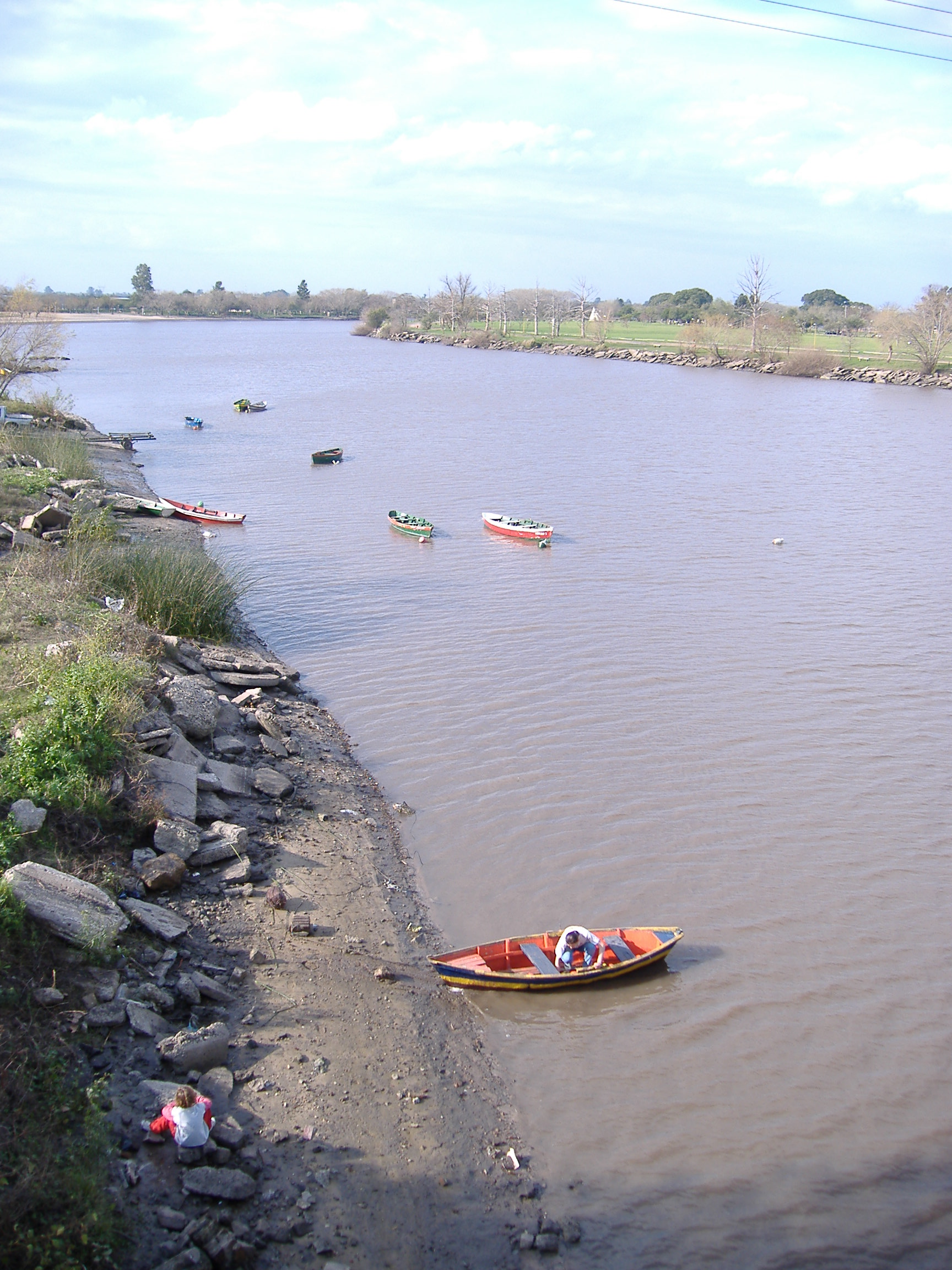
The river near the city of Gualeguaychú

The Gualeguaychú River (Spanish, Río Gualeguaychú) is a river in the province of Entre Ríos, Argentina. It starts in the center-east of the province, within the Colón Department, and flows south, passing by the city of Gualeguaychú and then emptying into the Uruguay River. Its drainage basin has an area of 6,693 square kilometres (2,584 mi^{2}).
