= Puerto Ibicuy =

- Municipality and village
- Location within Argentina
- Country: Argentina
- Province: Entre Ríos Province
- Time zone: UTC−3 (ART)

Puerto Ibicuy is a village and municipality in Entre Ríos Province in north-eastern Argentina.
