= Pueblo General Belgrano =

Coordinates: 33°00′37″S 58°30′51″W

- Municipality and village
- Interactive map of Pueblo General Belgrano
- Country: Argentina
- Province: Entre Ríos Province
- Department: Gualeguaychú Department
- Time zone: UTC−3 (ART)

Pueblo General Belgrano is a village and municipality in Gualeguaychú Department, Entre Ríos Province in north-eastern Argentina.
