= San Salvador, Entre Ríos =

San Salvador
- City
- Motto: Capital Nacional del Arroz
- Location of San Salvador in Argentina
- Coordinates: 31°37′S 58°30′W
- Country: Argentina
- Province: Entre Ríos
- Department: San Salvador
- Established: 25 de diciembre de 1889
- Founder: Miguel Pedro A. Malarín

Government
  - Mayor: Lucas Larrarte (PJ)

Area
  - Total: 6.22 km^{2} (2.40 sq mi)

Population (2010 census)
  - Total: 13,228
  - Density: 2,130/km^{2} (5,510/sq mi)
- Time zone: UTC−3 (ART)
- CPA base: E3218
- Dialing code: +54 345
- Website: Official Site (spanish)

San Salvador is a city in the province of Entre Ríos, Argentina. It has 13,228 inhabitants per the 2010 census [INDEC], and is the head town of the San Salvador Department. It is located on the center-east of the province, by National Route 18, about 48 km west of the Uruguay River and 205 km east from the provincial capital Paraná. The city is known as the 'National Capital of Rice'.

== History ==
The town was founded on December 25, 1889 by the lawyer Miguel Malarín. The focal point of the settlement was the Malarín family home, called Villa Aurora, after the mother of the founder, Aurora Saint-Sauveur. The name of the town was also a homage to her, as San Salvador is the Spanish literal translation of the French surname Saint-Sauveur. Colonists brought agriculture to the area (wheat, linseed, corn, sunflower, and later sorghum). Rice crops were planted first in 1932 and became popular, spreading to the whole province.

== Economy ==
The San Salvador Department has rice as its traditional crop, and the city of San Salvador is now known as the National Capital of Rice. The area also hosts industries producing truck chassis, agricultural machines, aluminium works, pumps, and rice mills.

== Tourism ==
=== National Museum of Rice Industry ===
The Museum displays the entire history of rice industry in Argentina. It is one of the three museums dedicated to the rice in the world.
