= Walter Moss =

Village in Argentina

- Municipality and village
- Location within Argentina
- Coordinates: 31°29′S 58°24′W
- Country: Argentina
- Province: Entre Ríos Province

Population (2001)
  - Total: 247

Walter Moss is a village and municipality in Entre Ríos Province in north-eastern Argentina.

Colonia Walter Moss is a rural town and town center with a 4th category governing board in the Walter Moss district of the San Salvador department, in Entre Ríos province, Argentina. It is located thirty kilometers northwest of General Campos.

It was not considered a locality in the 1991 and 2001 censuses, so the population was censused as a dispersed rural. The population of the governing board's jurisdiction was 247 in 2001.
