= Las Moscas, Entre Ríos =

Coordinates: 32°05′S 58°57′W

Las Moscas (Entre Ríos)
- Municipality and village
- Interactive map of Las Moscas (Entre Ríos)
- Country: Argentina
- Province: Entre Ríos Province
- Time zone: UTC−3 (ART)

Las Moscas (Entre Ríos) is a village and municipality in Entre Ríos Province in north-eastern Argentina.
