= Tezanos Pinto =

Coordinates: 31°52′S 60°29′W

- Municipality and village
- Interactive map of Tezanos Pinto
- Country: Argentina
- Province: Entre Ríos Province
- Time zone: UTC−3 (ART)

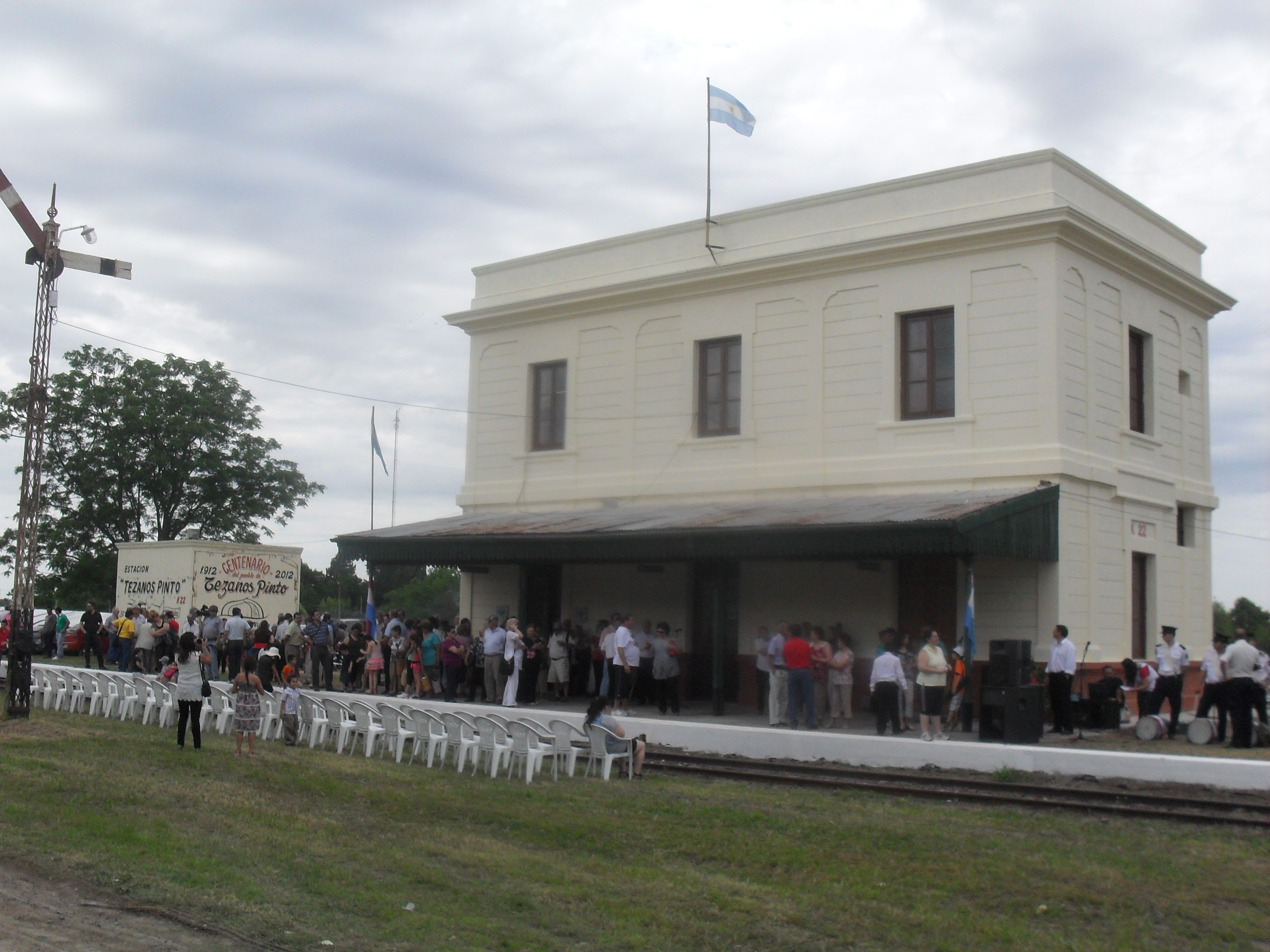
An image of Tezanos Pinto

Tezanos Pinto is a village and municipality in Entre Ríos Province in north-eastern Argentina.
