= Tydeo Larre Borges =

Tydeo Larre Borges (Paysandú, 25 September 1893-Montevideo, 1 September 1984) was a Uruguayan army officer and aviator, pioneer in the South American and international aviation. He was the first South American to cross the South Atlantic Ocean, flying with no scales with the French pilot Léon Challe on December 15, 1929 from Sevilla, Spain and arriving on December 17, 1929 near Maracajaú, Brazil.

Previous Flight In 1927 he had made a previous attempt to cross the Atlantic Ocean in a Domier Do J seaplane with two Farman engines of 550 H.P. But due to mechanical defects the seaplane baptized “Uruguay” had to land on the Atlantic coast of Africa, in southern Morocco, 150 km from Cape Juby. The crew integrated by Captain José Luis Ibarra, Captain Glauco Larre Borges, and mechanic Alferez José Rigoli swam to the coast. There they were made prisoners by members of a local tribe. A week afterwards they were rescued, in an episode of novelistic characteristics, by the pilots of the Latécoère company Marcel Reine and Antoine Léon. The French pilots were commissioned to rescue them by the Spanish government.

The Tydeo Larre Borges International Airport Paysandu Airport in Paysandu, Uruguay is named after him.
