= El Pingo =

El Pingo San Julián
- Municipality and Village
- Location of El Pingo in Argentina
- Coordinates: 31°35′S 59°53′W
- Country: Argentina
- Province: (Entre Ríos Province) Entre Ríos
- Department: Paraná
- Founded: 1905

Government
  - Leader: Diego Plassy
  - Type of municipality: Category I Government Board

Population (2010)
  - Total: 931
  - Men: 484
  - Women: 447
- Time zone: UTC−3 (ART)
- Postal code: E3132

El Pingo or San Julián is a village and municipality in Entre Ríos Province in north-eastern Argentina. The town was formed around El Pingo station.

== Geography and Population ==
El Pingo is located in the center-west sector of the province of Entre Ríos, 70 kilometres (43.50 mi) from the city of Paraná; 480 kilometres (298.26 mi) separates it from Buenos Aires, the federal capital of the country.

The local population in the rural area in 1991 was 559, which grew to 679 in 2001. The population of the governing board's jurisdiction was 903 inhabitants in 2001.

== Economics ==
El Pingo's main economic is the production of cereals using grains, such as corn, sunflower, soy, and sorghum. It also highlights the livestock activity.

== Climate ==
The average temperature of El Pingo is 18 °C (64.40 °F). The average annual rainfall is 1,000 millimetres (39.37 in) per year.

Pampero and Sudestada winds occur often, and north, east, and west winds are less frequent.

== Flora and Fauna ==
In this zone the existence of espinillos stands out, ñandubay, tala algarrobo, chañar, molle, and shade of bull. Previously this was an area of mountains that advanced to the center of the province.
