= Las Cuevas, Entre Ríos =

Coordinates: 32°21′S 60°29′W

Las Cuevas (Entre Ríos)
- Municipality and village
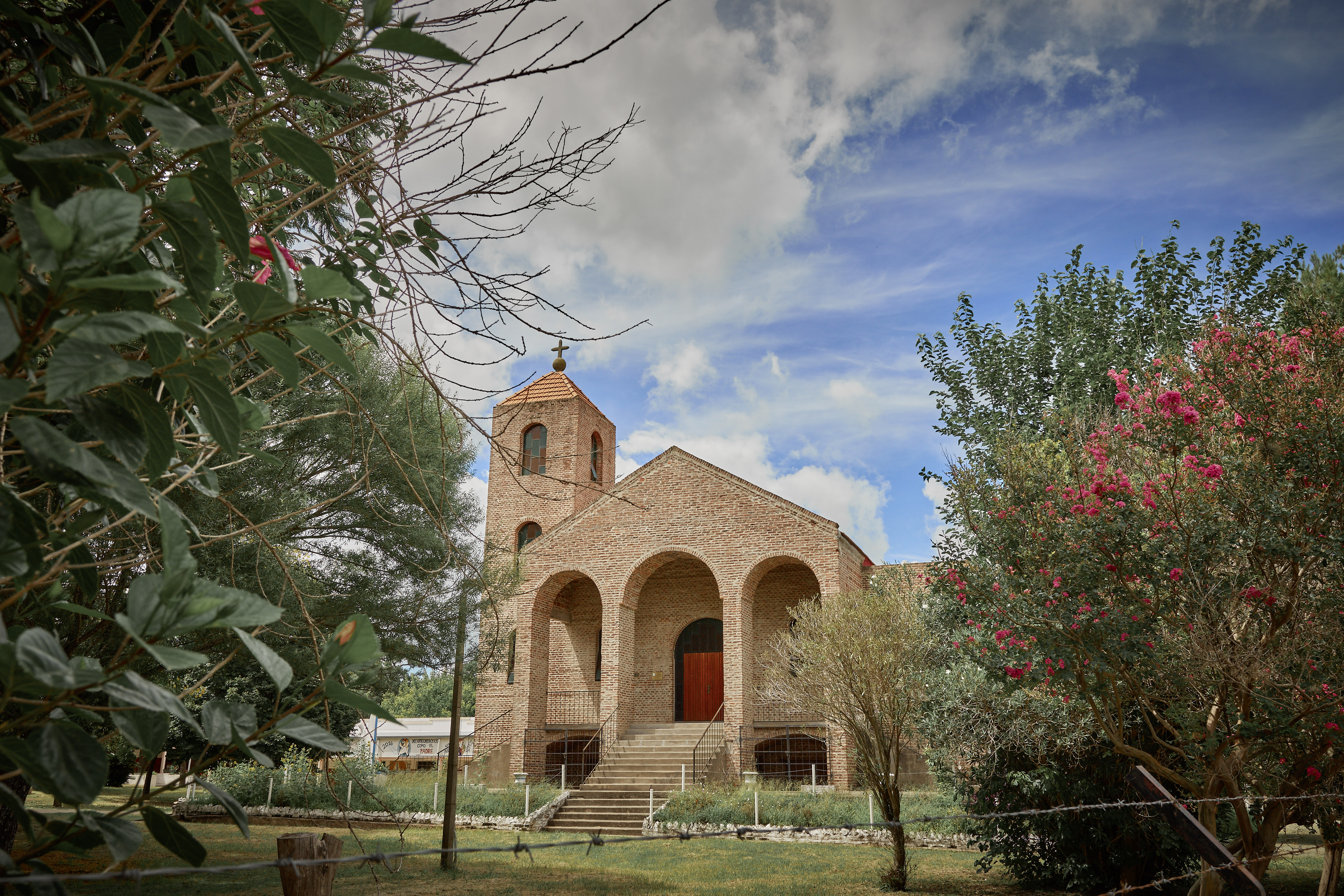
- Our Lady of Hope Parish
- Interactive map of Las Cuevas (Entre Ríos)
- Country: Argentina
- Province: Entre Ríos Province
- Time zone: UTC−3 (ART)

Las Cuevas (Entre Ríos) is a village and municipality in Entre Ríos Province in north-eastern Argentina.
