= San Ernesto, Entre Ríos =

Coordinates: 31°50′47″S 58°38′53″W

San Ernesto
- Municipality and village
- Interactive map of San Ernesto
- Country: Argentina
- Province: Entre Ríos Province
- Time zone: UTC−3 (ART)

San Ernesto is a village and municipality in Entre Ríos Province in north-eastern Argentina.
