= Paysandú Airport =

Tydeo Larre Borges International Airport Paysandú Airport
- IATA: PDU; ICAO: SUPU

Summary
- Airport type: Public
- Operator: Aeropuertos Uruguay
- Serves: Paysandú, Uruguay
- Elevation AMSL: 164 ft / 50 m
- Coordinates: 32°21′48″S 058°03′44″W

Map
- Location in Uruguay

Runways
Direction	Length		Surface
Direction	m	ft	Surface
02/20	1,320	4,330	Asphaltic Concrete
- Sources: SkyVector, GCM

Tydeo Larre Borges International Airport (Spanish: Aeroporto Internacional Tydeo Larre Borges) (IATA: PDU, ICAO: SUPU) is a general aviation airport serving Paysandú in the Paysandú Department of Uruguay. It is named after Tydeo Larre Borges, an Uruguayan aviation pioneer. The airport was redeveloped in the early 2020s, and was opened after renovation in March 2024.

== Location ==
The airport is located in Paysandú in the Paysandú Department in the coastal region of Uruguay. The airport is located approximately 3 km (1.9 mi) from Paysandú.

== History ==
The airport is named in honour of Tydeo Larre Borges (1893–1984), an Uruguayan aviation pioneer, who was the first South American to cross the South Atlantic Ocean, flying from Seville, Spain to Brazil on 15–17 December 1929 in a Breguet XIX TR Bidon aircraft. In February 2023, Aeropuertos Uruguay signed a concession agreement with the Uruguayan Ministry of Defence for the management of the airport for 30 years and incorporating the airport into the National Airport System (Sistema Nacional de Aeropuertos Internacionales).

The airport underwent modernization in 2024 at an estimated cost of US$ 12.5 million. It was part of the planned modernization programme to upgrade six airports in Uruguay. The programme included the upgradation of the runway, and lighting, installation of new fencing, construction of a fuel plant, and weather station. The renovated airport was inaugurated by Uruguayan president Luis Lacalle Pou on 17 December 2024.

== Infrastructure ==
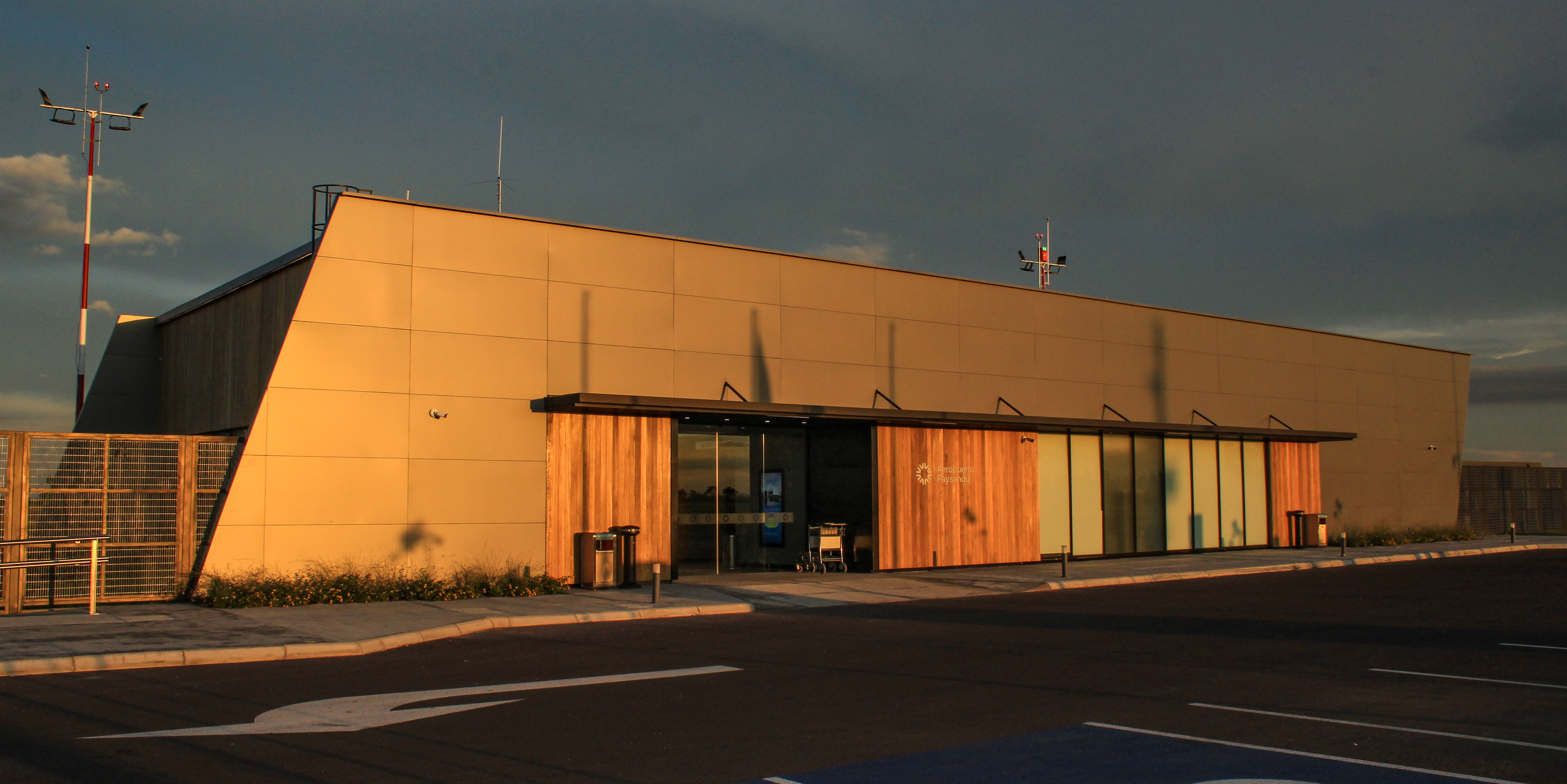
Passenger terminal at the airport

The airport has a single 1,320 m (4,330 ft)-long paved runway. The main runway was repaved, and equipped with new lightning during the renovation in 2024. The Gualeguaychú VOR-DME (Ident: GUA) is located 47.8 nmi (89 km) southwest of the airport, and the Paysandu non-directional beacon (Ident: PN) is located on the field of the airport.

A new passenger terminal, spread over an 650 m^{2} (7,000 sq ft), was constructed as a part of the modernization programme in 2024.

The airport does not have a control tower, and the operations are remotely monitored and controlled through Aerodrome Flight Information Service (AFIS) system from the Carrasco International Airport.

== Airlines and destinations ==
As of early 2026, there no scheduled passenger airline services to or from Tydeo Larre Borges International Airport.

== See also ==
- Transport in Uruguay
- List of airports in Uruguay
