= Estación Lazo =

Coordinates: 32°52′39″S 59°24′51″W

- Municipality and village
- Interactive map of Estación Lazo
- Country: Argentina
- Province: Entre Ríos Province
- Time zone: UTC−3 (ART)

Estación Lazo is a village and municipality in Entre Ríos Province in north-eastern Argentina.
