= Betbeder =

Coordinates: 32°23′S 59°55′W

- Municipality and village
- Interactive map of Betbeder
- Country: Argentina
- Province: Entre Ríos Province
- Time zone: UTC−3 (ART)

Betbeder is a village and municipality in Entre Ríos Province in north-eastern Argentina.
