= General Almada =

Coordinates: 32°50′S 58°48′W

- Municipality and village
- Interactive map of General Almada
- Country: Argentina
- Province: Entre Ríos Province
- Time zone: UTC−3 (ART)

General Almada is a village and municipality in Entre Ríos Province in north-eastern Argentina.
