= Gualeguaychú Airport =

Airport in Argentina

Gualeguaychú Airport Aeropuerto de Gualeguaychú
- IATA: GHU; ICAO: SAAG

Summary
- Airport type: Public
- Serves: Gualeguaychú, Argentina
- Elevation AMSL: 75 ft (23 m)
- Coordinates: 33°00′20″S 58°36′46″W

Map
- Location of the airport in Argentina

Runways
Direction	Length		Surface
Direction	m	ft	Surface
01/19	1,330	4,364	Asphalt
- Sources: WAD SkyVector Google Maps

Gualeguaychú Airport (Spanish: Aeropuerto de Gualeguaychú) (IATA: GHU, ICAO: SAAG) is an airport serving Gualeguaychú, a city in the Entre Ríos Province of Argentina. The city is 17 kilometres (11 mi) inland from the Uruguay River, which is the border between Argentina and Uruguay. The airport is 6 kilometres (4 mi) west of Gualeguaychú.

The Gualeguaychu VOR-DME (Ident: GUA) is located on the field. It also serves the Paysandú Airport in nearby Paysandú, Uruguay.

== See also ==
- List of airports in Argentina
- Transport in Argentina
