= Pueblo Brugo =

Coordinates: 31°23′S 60°06′W

- Municipality and village
- Interactive map of Pueblo Brugo
- Country: Argentina
- Province: Entre Ríos Province
- Time zone: UTC−3 (ART)

Pueblo Brugo is a village and municipality in Entre Ríos Province in north-eastern Argentina.
