= Francisco Gárate Aranguren =

Spanish Jesuit

Blessed Francisco Gárate Aranguren SJ
- Born: 3 February 1857; Azpeitia, Guipúzcoa, Kingdom of Spain
- Died: 9 September 1929 (aged 72); Deusto, Bilbao, Vizcaya, Kingdom of Spain
- Venerated in: Roman Catholic Church
- Beatified: 6 October 1985, Saint Peter's Square, Vatican City by Pope John Paul II
- Feast: 9 September

Francisco Gárate Aranguren, SJ (3 February 1857 - 9 September 1929) was a Spanish Jesuit. Aranguren served as a nurse after receiving his qualification in 1877 and became noted for his encouragement and his tender care to the needs of students in his care.

His reputation for personal holiness led to calls for his beatification cause to commence and Pope John Paul II beatified him on 6 October 1985 on Saint Peter's Square.

== Life ==
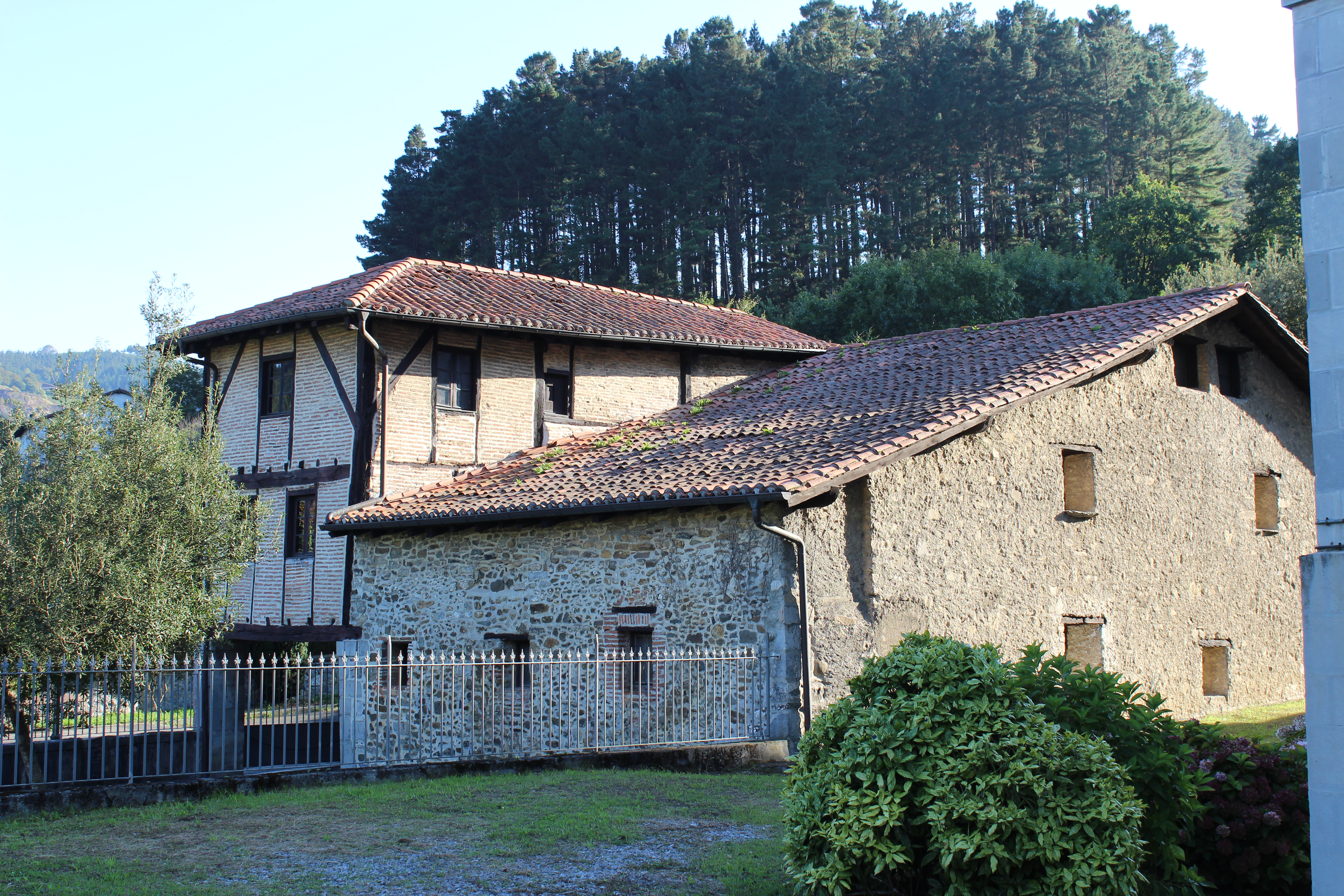
Birthplace of Francisco Gárate

Francisco Gárate Aranguren was born on 3 February 1857 in the Kingdom of Spain as the second of seven brothers to Francisco and Maria Aranguren. He was born not far from the birthplace of Ignatius of Loyola.

At the age of fourteen he left his home for domestic work in a Catholic college that had just been opened in Orduña. In 1874 he decided to become a Jesuit — though not a priest — and so he and two companions travelled on foot to Poyanne in France to commence their novitiate. The group did this because the Spanish Jesuits were expelled in 1869 and had to open a branch in France.

The novice made his first vows on 2 February 1876 and left the town on 29 October 1877 to be a sacristan and nurse in the La Guardia college at Pontevedra, where he spent the next ren years. It was his first assigned task since he finished his novitiate in which he had 200 male students in his care. He made his final vows on 15 August 1887 (the Feast of the Assumption) and in late March 1888 was assigned to the Deusto college as a doorkeeper and sacristan. He remained in that post until his death. Two of his brothers followed his example and themselves became professed Jesuit brothers.

Aranguren tended to ill students with care and kindness while being attentive to their needs.

Admittedly, this hall of the university gave rather the image of a busy port: parents were talking with their children, men of all walks of life were discussing their affairs with Fathers or professors ... Add to that the delivery men bringing goods or food, beggars in search of alms. It was preferably in this crowd that this excellent man welcomed each and everyone in particular with his kind smile, greeted those who were leaving, comforted the hearts of all either with a well-adapted word or with a conversation. peaceful and very courteous; so much so that I wondered what surprised me most.

He offered consolation and encouragement to students and the public. "I calmly do what I can, the rest is done by the Lord, who can do everything. With his help everything is light and smooth, because we serve a good master." He was noted for his methods of simple living; in terms of his room, clothes, and the foods that he ate.

His health started to fail on 8 September 1920 when he began to suffer sharp abdominal pains following Mass. He agreed to remain in bed on the condition that he finish the remainder of his chores. He asked for the viaticum that evening but his discomfort was so bad that a nurse called the doctor who had to operate on his blocked urethra. He had brief relief but, despite the successful operation, continued to decline. Aranguren died on 9 September 1929 at 7 a.m. after receiving the last rites – it was the feast of Saint Peter Claver. Students made their rosaries and crucifixes touch his coffin. His remains were exhumed in August 1946 and relocated in 1964 to a chapel at the university.

== Beatification ==
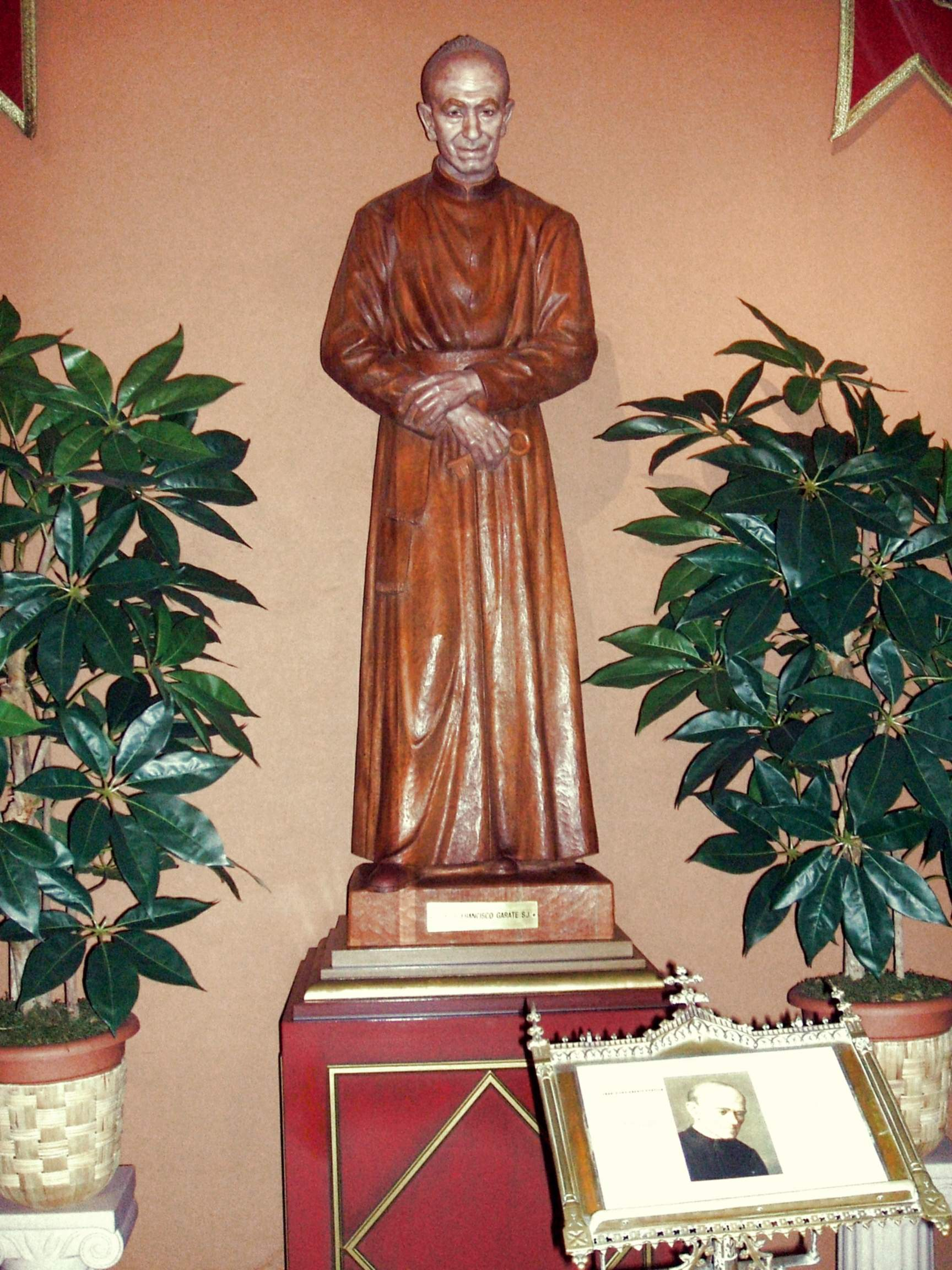
Statue of Aranguren the Church of the Most Sacred Heart in Bilbao

The beatification process opened in both Bilbao and Vitoria with an informative process spanning from 14 December 1939 to 29 July 1940 tasked with collating available documentation and witness testimonies attesting to his saintliness. His writings were collated separate from other documents so they could be studied in depth, and were approved by theologians on 13 February 1942.

The Congregation of Rites under Pope Pius XII granted formal approval to the cause on 22 February 1950, which granted Aranguren the title Servant of God. The Congregation granted ratification to the processes on 16 February 1962. On 11 February 1982, Aranguren was proclaimed venerable, after Pope John Paul II determined that Aranguren had lived a life of heroic virtue.

A miracle attributed to Aranguren's intercession was investigated in the diocese of its origin and was ratified on 15 April 1983. The Congregation approved it on 26 March 1985 and the Pope on 9 May 1985. John Paul II beatified him on 6 October 1985.

== See also ==
- Catholic Church in Spain
