= Gualeguaychú, Entre Ríos =

Gualeguaychú
- City
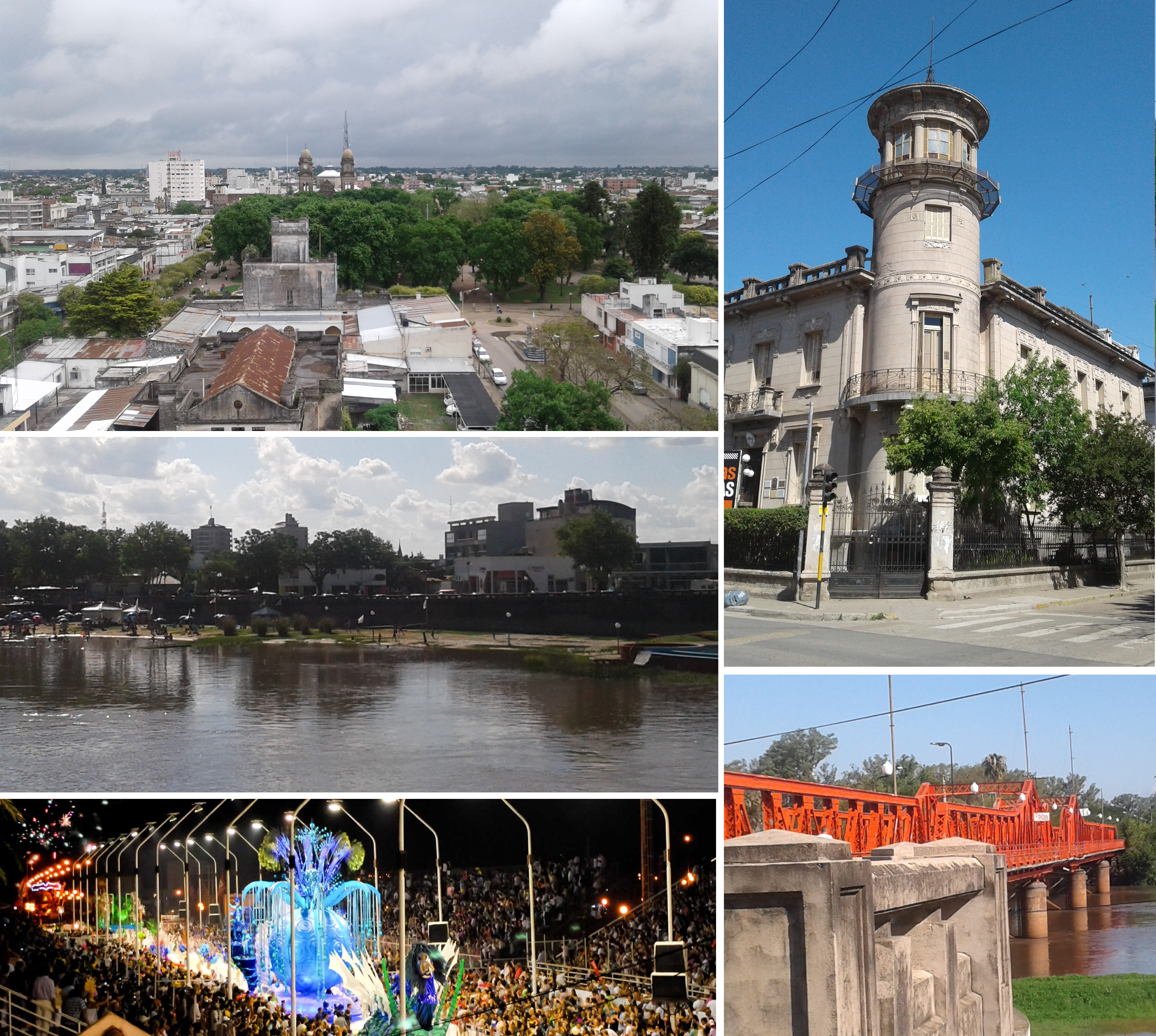
- Gualeguaychú, Argentina

- Location of Gualeguaychú in Argentina
- Coordinates: 33°1′S 58°31′W
- Country: Argentina
- Province: Entre Ríos
- Department: Gualeguaychú
- Founded: October 18, 1783
- Founder: Tomas de Rocamora

Government
  - Intendant: Mauricio Davico
- Elevation: 15 m (49 ft)

Population (2010 census)
  - Total: 109,266
- Time zone: UTC−3 (ART)
- ZIP Code: E2820
- Dialing code: +54 3446
- Website: Official website

Gualeguaychú is a city in the province of Entre Ríos, Argentina, on the left bank of the Gualeguaychú River (a tributary of the Uruguay River). It is located on the south-east of the province, approximately 230 km north-west of Buenos Aires. It has a population of 109,266 according to the 2010 Census.

Being at the opposite of Fray Bentos, at the Argentina–Uruguay border, the city is located near the National Route 14, a route that connects Argentina's capital Buenos Aires to the Northeastern end of the Argentine Mesopotamia region.

The city hosts an annual carnival that is regionally well-known and attended by people from many other provinces and countries around the world. It is considered one of the largest carnivals in the world. Gualeguaychú also has hot springs, beach resorts, and a casino.

Near Gualeguaychú is Pueblo Belgrano, a municipality that belongs to the city, which is well known for its hot springs. Gualeguaychú should not be confused with Gualeguay, another city also in Entre Ríos, located about 80 km (50 mi) west.

== Topology ==
The city took the name of the river that is next to it, Gualeguaychú. According to records from 1715 made by the priest Polycarp Dufoo, the name comes from the Guaraní expression, "yaguarí guazú", which would mean "big-water river".

According to scholars of toponymy, there are other definitions such as "Slow-go Water" or "River of the Small Pig Caves" (with pig meaning capybara) the latter by the similarity to the word Gualeguay.

== History ==
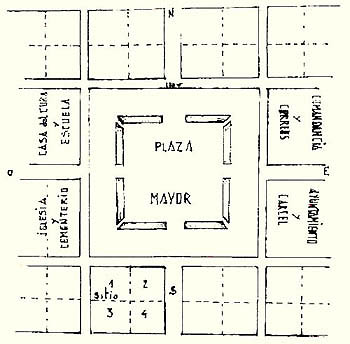
Foundation Plan of Gualeguaychú

The land has been inhabited since pre-Hispanic times by Chaná, Charrúa. From the 17th century, Spanish representatives from Santa Fe and Buenos Aires gave possession of these lands to settlers who founded precarious rural settlements in constant dispute with the native tribes. These conflicts resulted in series of campaigns and extermination and enslavement of the natives, who had been decimated by the mid-eighteenth century. In the final decades of the century, the number of people scattered throughout the area from Buenos Aires and Santa Fe, including Jesuit missionaries, increased. These inhabitants developed a subsistence economy and had conflicts with landowner settlers, who had already been settled there for decades.

In 1770, a settlement was established around a chapel in the south of Gualeguaychú.

In December 1777 the rancher Esteban Justo García de Zúñiga was appointed as the “commander of the parties of Gualeguaychú, Gualeguay and Uruguay". In 1779 the bishop of Buenos Aires, Sebastián Malvar y Pinto, visited the zone. When he saw the precarious situation of the smallholders in comparison to the ranchers and Portuguese incursions, he decided to inform the viceroy about this. In 1782, Viceroy Juan José de Vértiz y Salcedo commissioned a sergeant major from Dragones de Almanza, Tomás de Rocamora, to organize the villagers scattered in villages in the region to reinforce the Spanish presence in the area before the Portuguese incursions from the Banda Oriental.

Gualeguaychú was founded on October 18, 1783 by sergeant Tomas de Rocamora under Viceroy Vértiz. When he arrived at the town Rocamora noticed that the place where the first settlement had been established was low and prone to flooding, so he decided to move it to the north, in front of Libertad Island. According to the Indian's laws, Rocamora cleared the land, took the measurement, assigned the public places, distributed 85 pieces of land, chose the members of the Primer Cabildo (the first town council) and appointed San José as the patron saint. Therefore, the town was called San José de Gualeguaychú.

=== 20th century ===
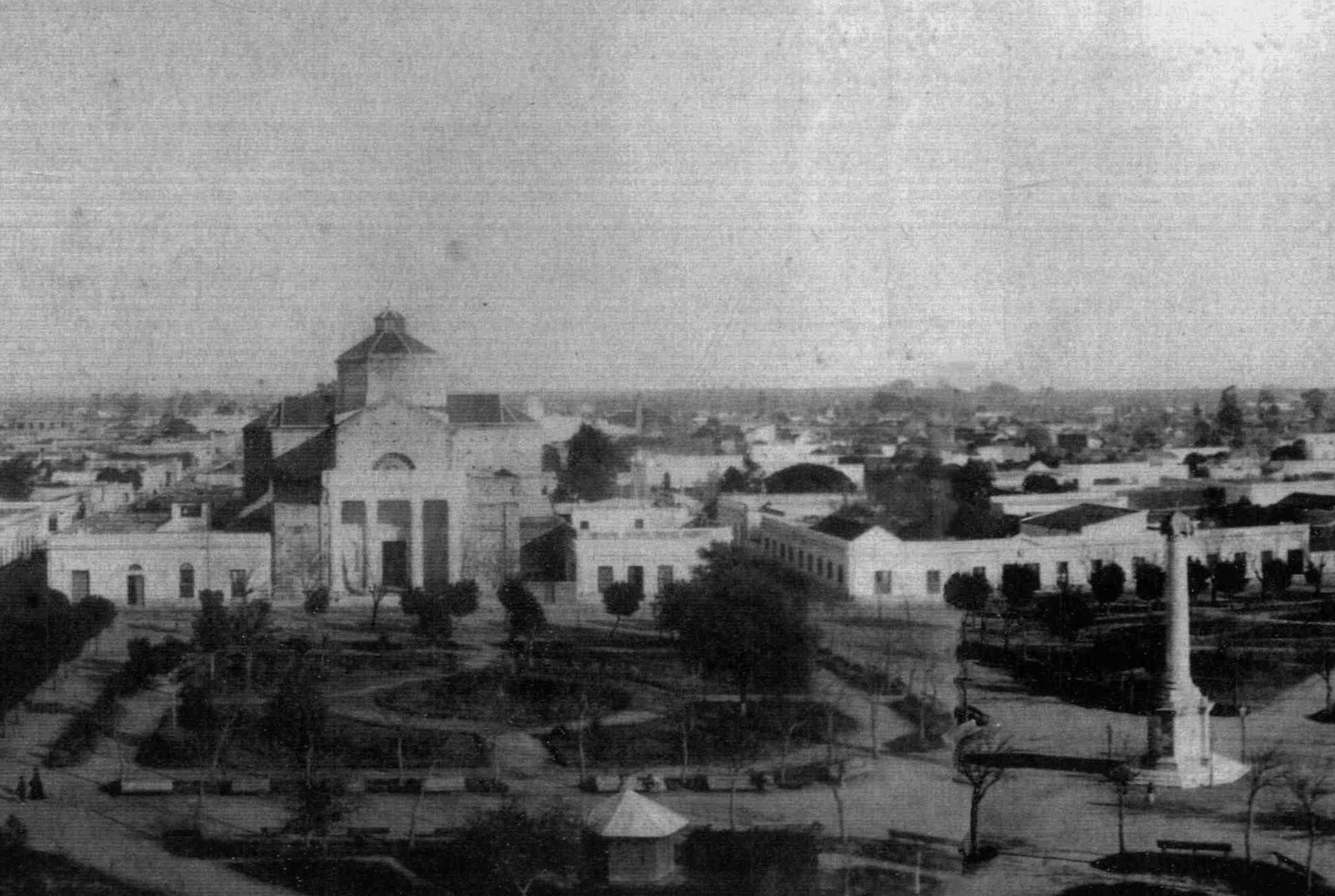
Gualeguaychú around 1900

During the first decades of the twentieth century, Gualeguaychú continued growing, with the population reaching 18,000 citizens by 1914. Further population growth was brought about by economic diversification, such as the installation of new cereal mills, the growth of business on the main street, 25 de Mayo. These factors as well as a port and Gualeguaychú's railway station caused the city to expand well beyond the capital square (now called Plaza de San Martín).

== Cellulose plants conflict ==
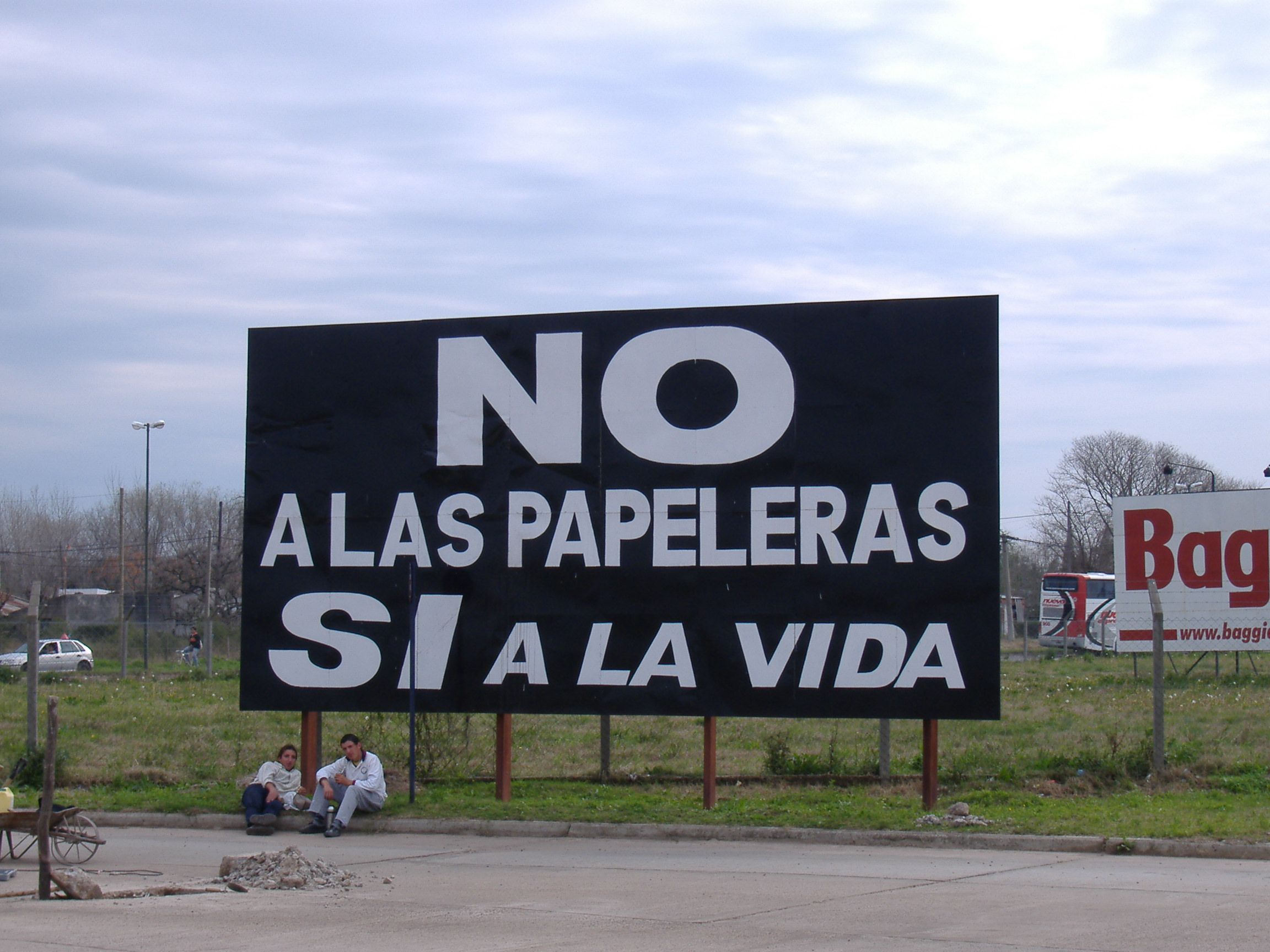
Poster condemning the cellulose plants

Gualeguaychú is located near the international Libertador General San Martín Bridge, which connects the nearby town of Puerto Unzué with Fray Bentos, Uruguay, across the Uruguay River. For years, the local residents had warned about the proposed installation of two large cellulose processing plants, called Botnia, near Fray Bentos, which would allegedly pollute the river. In 2005, the Citizens' Environmental Assembly of Gualeguaychú took the step of blocking Route 136 and the international bridge. Further blockades, sometimes lasting weeks, continued in 2006, seriously damaging the tourist season of Uruguay and causing major inconveniences to international trade. The ecological cause of Gualeguaychú jumped to the national scene and the conflict escalated, leading to diplomatic and legal battles including an accusation before the International Court of Justice. The conflict ended in 2010, during the presidencies of Cristina Fernández de Kirchner (Argentina) and José Mujica (Uruguay), with the establishment of a joint coordination of the activities in the river

== Tourism ==
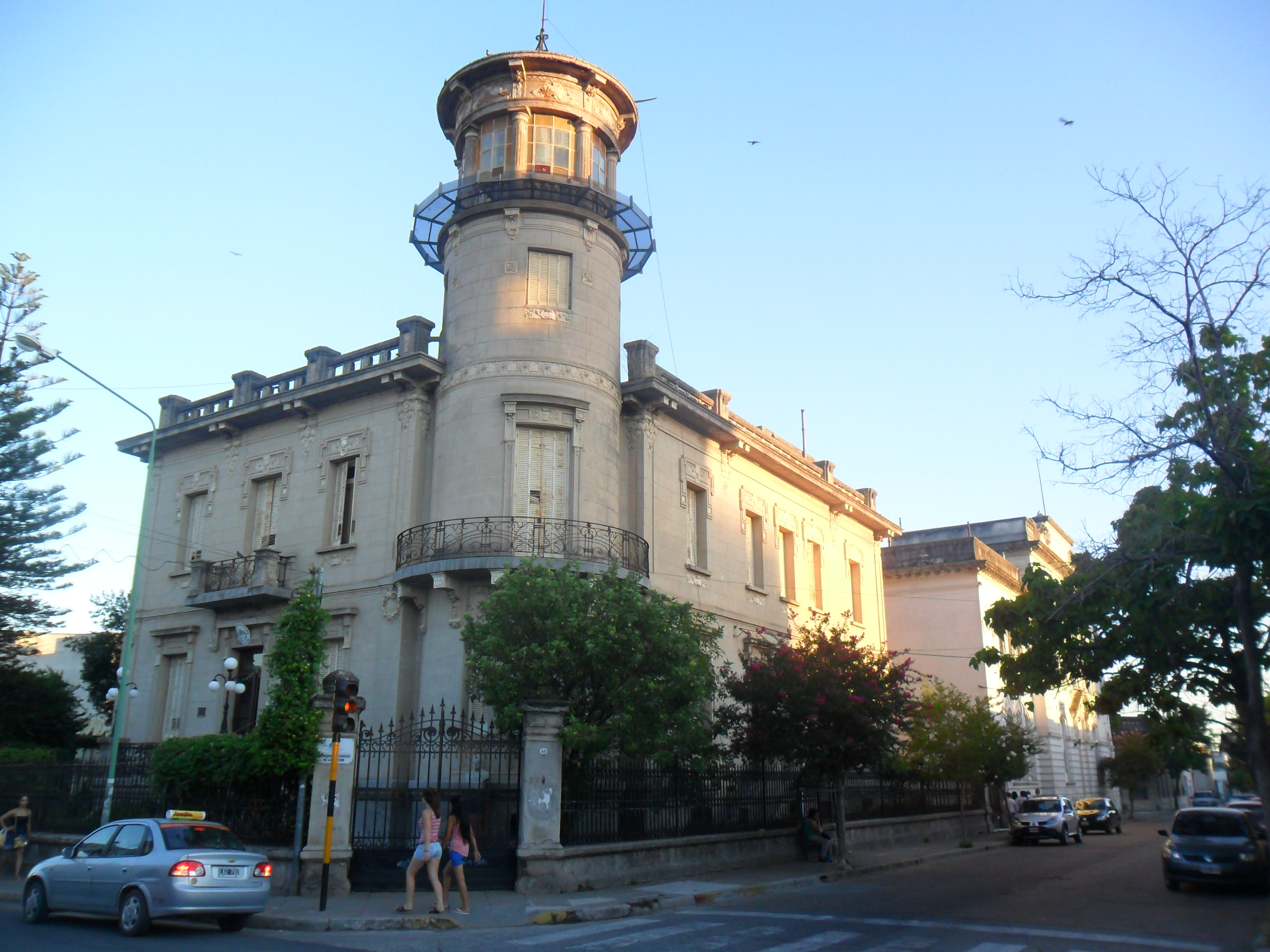
Architecture of Gualeguaychú.

Gualeguaychú is one of the touristic cities closest to the urban conglomerates in the provinces of Buenos Aires and Santa Fe and one of the most visited Argentine cities by international tourists. There is a high influx of tourists during the summer months, reaching up to 400,000, primarily from the Federal Capital and the province of Buenos Aires, but also enjoying a recent increase in tourists from the provinces of Santa Fe and Cordoba attracted to the "Carnival of the Country" and city beaches.

The new bus terminal is located in the extreme south-west of the city. The passenger transport services are numerous and provide transportation links with the various parts of the country and abroad.

== Transportation ==
The city is served by Gualeguaychú Airport.

== Carnival ==
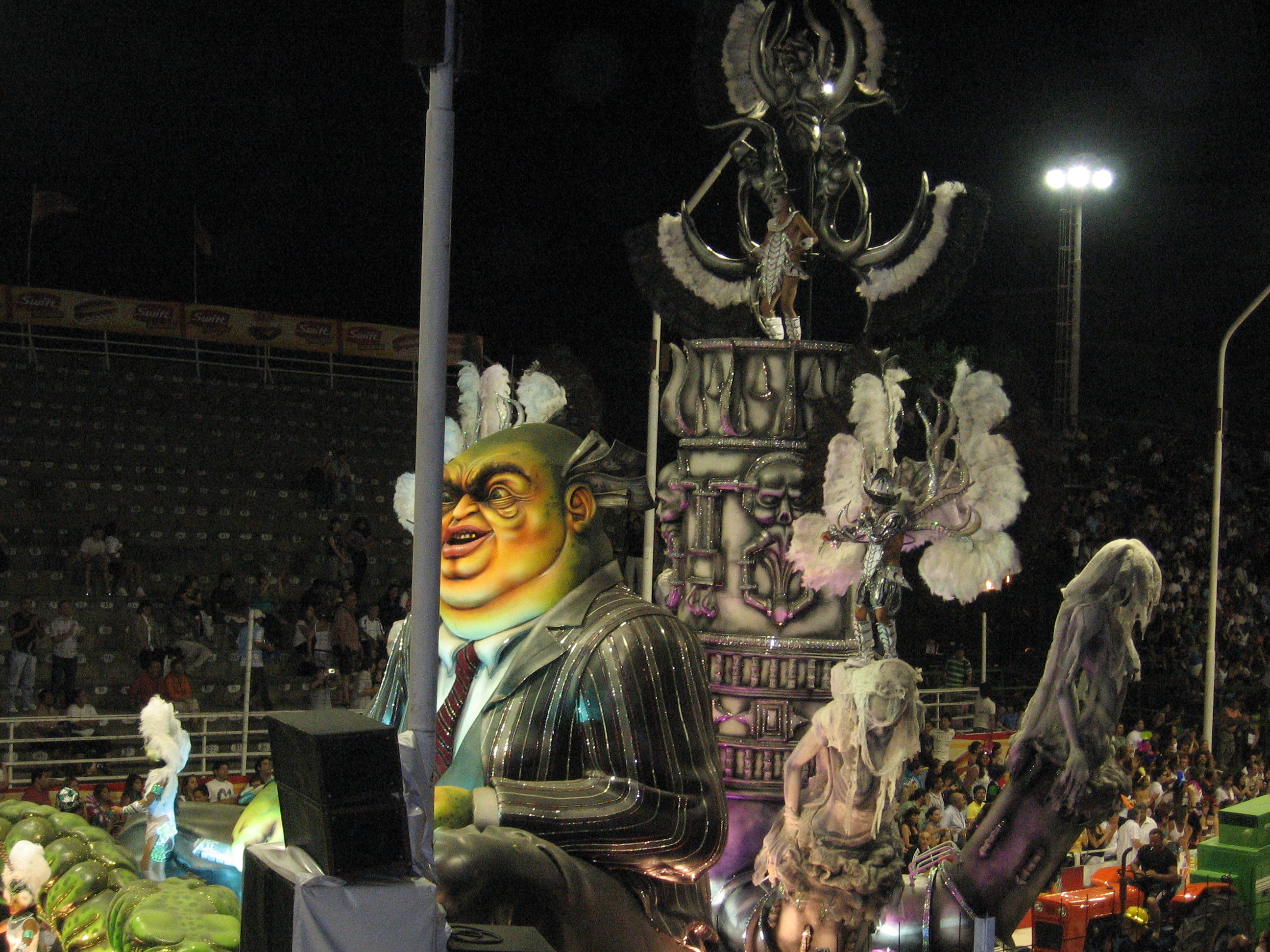
Carroza del carnaval de Gualeguaychú, 2010

"The Carnival of the Country" is a float-parade that takes part in the corsodromo (a place specially designed for this event), every Saturday of January, February and the 1st Saturday of March. It has an audience of about 40,000 people each night. The Carnival has five comparsas (a group of people that represents a club or a social centre) which are called Mari–Mari, Papelitos, Ara-Yeví, Kamar and O’Bahia. These comparsas compete against each other for a prize which consists of 31% of the money earned by the tickets however only three of them participate on any year. Approximately US$350,000 is spent by each comparsa. In 2011, the winner was Mari–Mari with the topic, Fobo

== City progress ==
The original settlement progressed slowly. Bit by bit the poor houses started turning into brick houses. Buildings were built to be the new church and others places. During the anarchy between 1810 and 1853, Gualeguaychú was a place where the army used to pass through. In September 1845, soldiers commanded by Giuseppe Garibaldi sacked the village. Liberty Island in the Gualeguaychù river in front of the city was where Justo José de Urquiza organized the “Big Army”.

== Climate ==
The weather in the most parts of Entre Ríos is warm but during the winter months it can get to around 0 °C. Summer temperatures can reach up to and above 35 °C, .the average annual rainfall is about 1,200 mm and the average annual humidity is 75%. Gualeguaychú holds the record for the most rainfall on one day amongst Argentine cities when 359.4 millimetres (14 in) of precipitation fell.

Climate data for Gualeguaychú, Entre Ríos (1991–2020, extremes 1961–present)
Month	Jan	Feb	Mar	Apr	May	Jun	Jul	Aug	Sep	Oct	Nov	Dec	Year
Record high °C (°F)	41.9 (107.4)	40.6 (105.1)	38.2 (100.8)	36.0 (96.8)	33.2 (91.8)	29.9 (85.8)	32.4 (90.3)	35.2 (95.4)	37.0 (98.6)	37.1 (98.8)	39.3 (102.7)	40.7 (105.3)	41.0 (105.8)
Mean daily maximum °C (°F)	31.2 (88.2)	29.7 (85.5)	28.0 (82.4)	24.2 (75.6)	20.2 (68.4)	17.3 (63.1)	16.6 (61.9)	19.3 (66.7)	20.9 (69.6)	23.8 (74.8)	27.2 (81.0)	29.9 (85.8)	24.0 (75.2)
Daily mean °C (°F)	24.9 (76.8)	23.6 (74.5)	21.8 (71.2)	18.0 (64.4)	14.4 (57.9)	11.5 (52.7)	10.7 (51.3)	12.8 (55.0)	14.9 (58.8)	18.0 (64.4)	21.0 (69.8)	23.5 (74.3)	17.9 (64.2)
Mean daily minimum °C (°F)	18.8 (65.8)	18.0 (64.4)	16.3 (61.3)	12.7 (54.9)	9.8 (49.6)	6.9 (44.4)	6.0 (42.8)	7.4 (45.3)	9.3 (48.7)	12.4 (54.3)	14.8 (58.6)	17.1 (62.8)	12.5 (54.5)
Record low °C (°F)	7.0 (44.6)	6.3 (43.3)	2.8 (37.0)	−0.4 (31.3)	−4.0 (24.8)	−7.6 (18.3)	−6.9 (19.6)	−5.1 (22.8)	−4.0 (24.8)	−1.0 (30.2)	2.0 (35.6)	4.5 (40.1)	−7.6 (18.3)
Average precipitation mm (inches)	130.3 (5.13)	122.9 (4.84)	128.4 (5.06)	124.4 (4.90)	81.8 (3.22)	57.8 (2.28)	56.5 (2.22)	60.6 (2.39)	78.6 (3.09)	121.0 (4.76)	115.5 (4.55)	140.2 (5.52)	1,218 (47.95)
Average precipitation days (≥ 0.1 mm)	7.5	7.4	7.7	8.7	6.9	6.3	6.1	5.8	7.1	9.0	7.9	9.2	89.6
Average relative humidity (%)	67.5	72.7	74.7	78.4	81.5	82.0	80.0	75.5	72.7	73.0	67.5	65.8	74.3
Mean monthly sunshine hours	257.3	214.7	198.4	177.0	155.0	129.0	148.8	173.6	162.0	192.2	237.0	238.7	2,283.7
Mean daily sunshine hours	8.3	7.6	6.4	5.9	5.0	4.3	4.8	5.6	5.4	6.2	7.9	7.7	6.2
Percentage possible sunshine	61	61	51	56	49	40	42	47	45	52	59	56	52
Source 1: Servicio Meteorológico Nacional
Source 2: NOAA (percent sun 1961–1990)

== Unzué Park ==
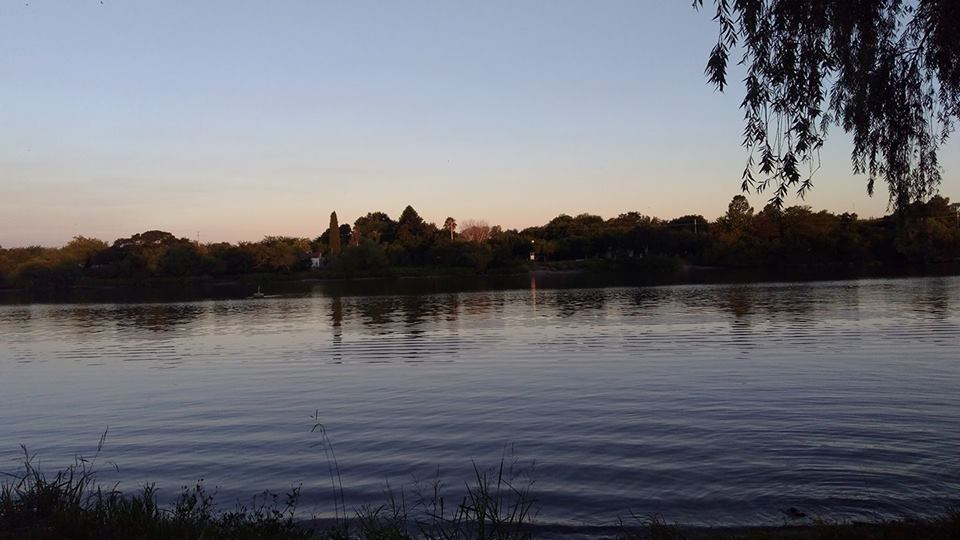
Gualeguaychú River

One of Gualeguaychú's most impressive features is Unzué Park, which is located on the opposing banks of the Gualeguaychú river. It is about 120 hectares in size and includes a lagoon.

== Thermal Baths ==
Gualeguaychú has two thermal baths open to the public, the Termas Guaychu and Complejo Termas del Gualeguaychù. The former has swimming pools with temperatures of up to 40 °C. Located in a large space surrounded by countryside, this location benefits from a wide variety of flora and fauna.

== Other attractions ==
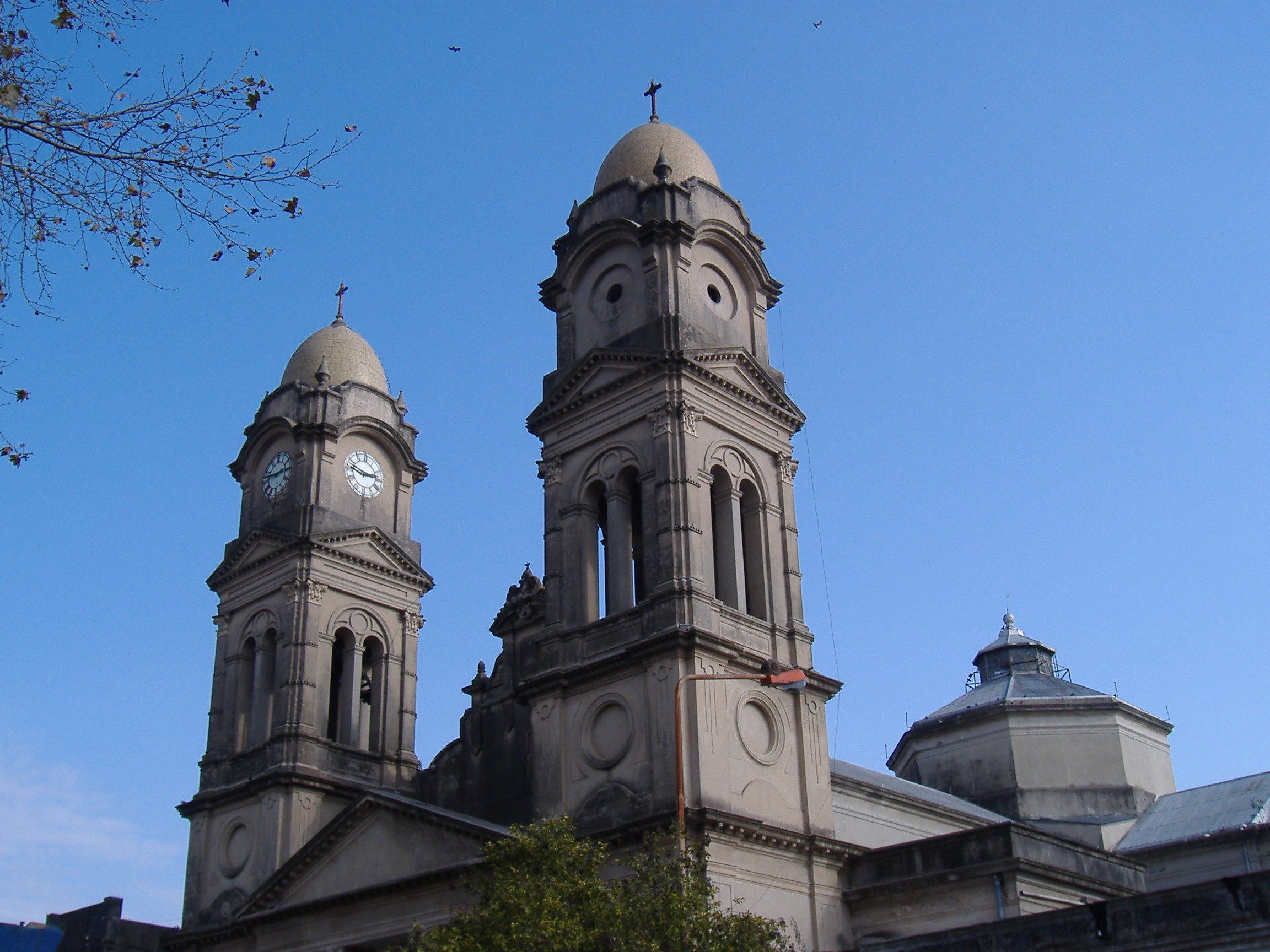
Gualeguaychú Cathedral

The cornerstone of the Cathedral Church of St. Joseph, under the patronage of the Virgin of Rosario and Saint Joseph, was laid May 30, 1863. Godfather ceremony was the Governor of Entre Rios, Justo José de Urquiza, who attended the ceremony with his wife Dolores Costa. The project was the work of Swiss architect Bernardo Poncini and building was overseen by him and his brother, Roberto. The work was delayed but inauguration took place on March 19, 1890. By 1910 the towers and porch were completed. In 1959 due to a danger of collapse, the towers were demolished and replaced by the current domes.

Clavarino Palace, where the activities take place in the Middle Level and Polimodal College Luis Clavarino, was founded on October 21, 1905. Méndez Casariego Bridge crosses the Gualeguaychú river to the Park Unzué and Pueblo General Belgrano, and the nature reserve "Las Piedras". The bridge was repaired in late 2007 because there was a danger of collapse.

== Gualeguaychú Theatre ==
The theatre was founded on August 23, 1910, by Gustavo de Denken, José Casaretto, Bartolomé Raggio, Julián Irazusta, Nicolás Medrano and Enrique Sobral,

The style of the theatre was inspired the Viennese Secession. The interior, consisting of the Chamber, is in the shape of a floor horseshoe and is surrounded by a lower tier of boxes.

The first level is a gathering area with corresponding boxes on the upper level and Paradise. This part was originally intended for lower social classes and used to have a separate entrance to Peron Street.

== Notable people ==
- Olegario Víctor Andrade (1839–1882) – poet, journalist, and politician
- Julio Irazusta (1899–1982) – nacionalista writer and politician
- Fray Mocho (1858–1903) – writer and journalist
- Carlos Isaack (1924–2000, sprinter
- Martín Ojeda (born 1998) – footballer
