= Pastor Britos =

Coordinates: 32°46′S 58°53′W

- Municipality and village
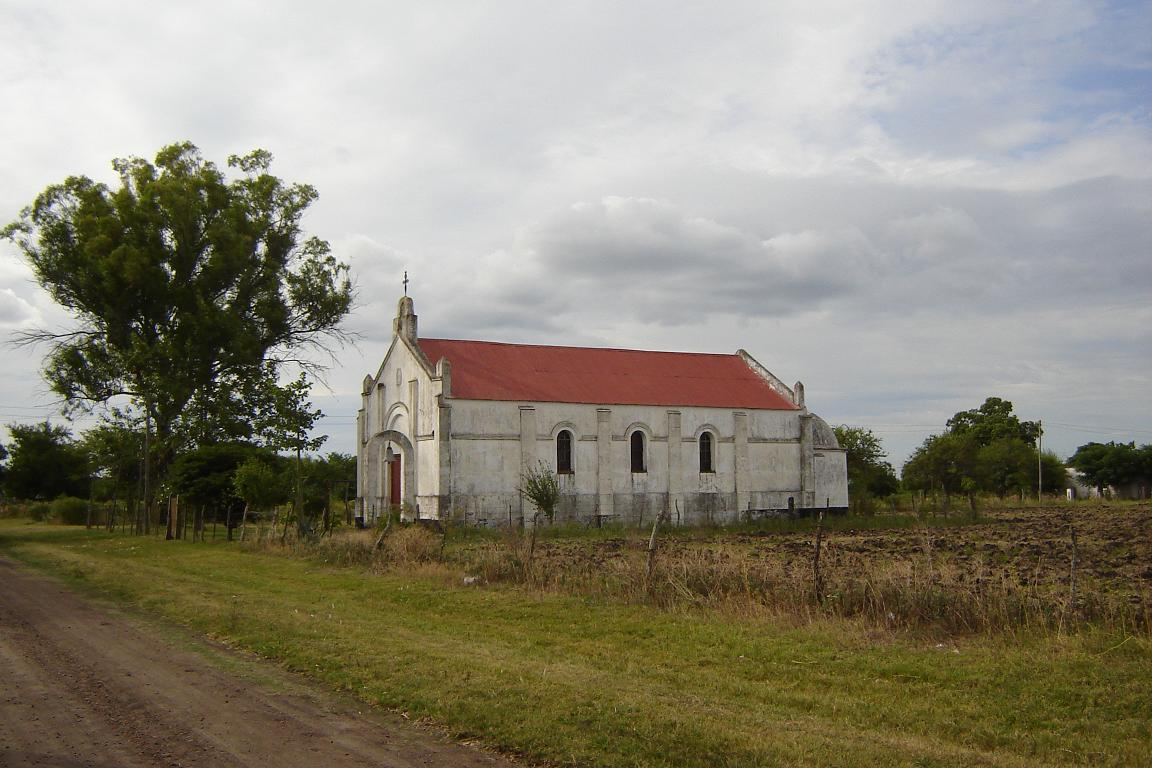
- Interactive map of Pastor Britos
- Country: Argentina
- Province: Entre Ríos Province
- Time zone: UTC−3 (ART)

Pastor Britos is a village and municipality in Entre Ríos Province in north-eastern Argentina. It is a place and rural population center governing board 4th category of Pehuajó Gualeguaychú North district department in the province of Entre Rios, Argentina. It is 45 km northwest of the city of Gualeguaychú, 8 km from Urdinarrain and 192 km of Paraná. The town grew around a train station, now defunct. Town was not considered in the censuses of 1991 and 2001 so that the population was surveyed as a dispersed rural area without precisar.2 3 One of the popular events that take place regularly, is a pilgrimage from the town of Urdinarrain to the grotto located in Pastor Britos. It is connected by Route 51, with the towns of Urdinarrain, Parera, Irazusta, Larroque and E. Carbo. And another way you can get from Gualeguaychú through Palavecino, Almada and Parera.4 5 Dr. Scholein Rivenson, inventor of the vaccine for foot and mouth disease was born in Pastor Britos. The Governing Board was created by Decree 2434/1988 MGJOSP 26 May 1988.6 In the 2011 elections the 5 vowels of the governing board elected at common polling Faustino M. Parera, including it in their jurisdiction. Because there was a tie, the election was repeated
