= Faustino M. Parera =

Coordinates: 32°48′S 58°53′W

- Municipality and village
- Interactive map of Faustino M. Parera
- Country: Argentina
- Province: Entre Ríos Province
- Time zone: UTC−3 (ART)

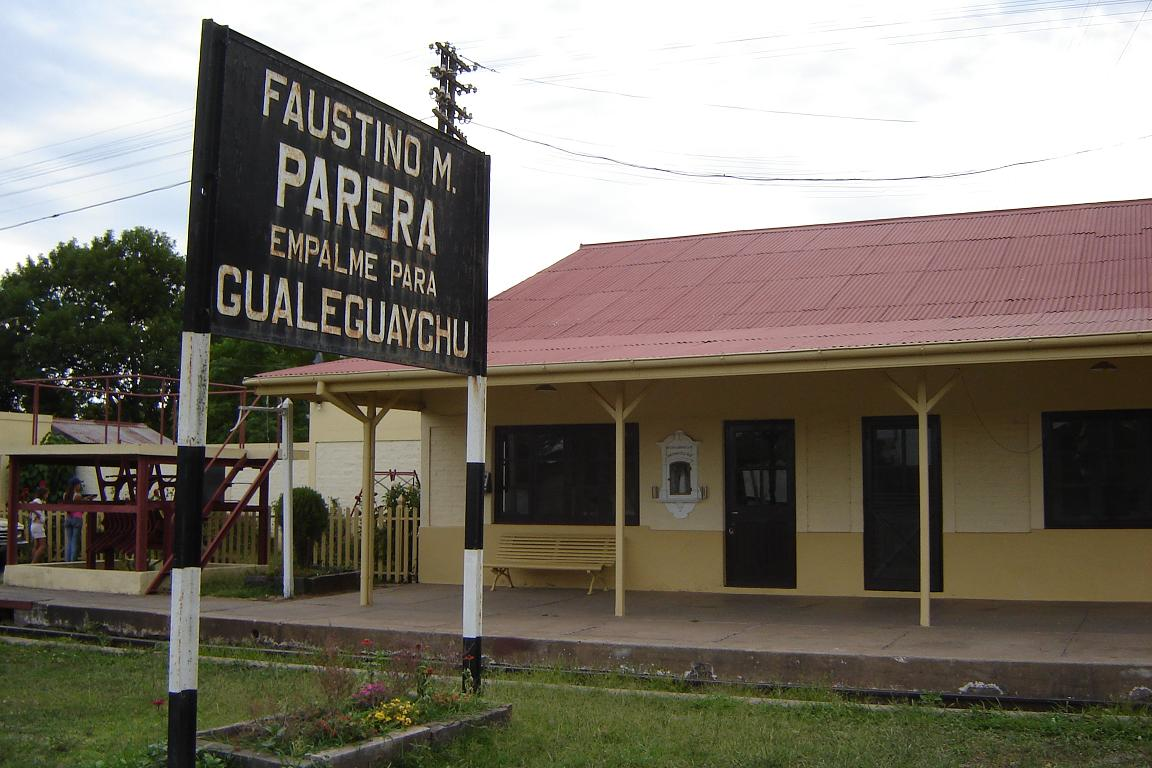

Faustino M. Parera is a village and municipality in Entre Ríos Province in north-eastern Argentina.
