= General Campos =

- Town
- Location of General Campos in Argentina
- Coordinates: 31°32′S 58°24′W
- Country: Argentina
- Province: Entre Ríos
- Department: San Salvador

Government
  - Mayor: Teodoro Pablo Martinez (Justicialist Party)

Population
  - Total: 2,982
- Time zone: UTC−3 (ART)
- CPA base: E3216
- Dialing code: +54 345

General Campos is a town in the center-east of the Province of Entre Ríos, Argentina.It is located about 35 km west of the Uruguay River and 220 km east from the provincial capital Paraná. The town was founded on June 8, 1913.
