= Estación Escriña =

Coordinates: 32°35′S 58°54′W

- Municipality and village
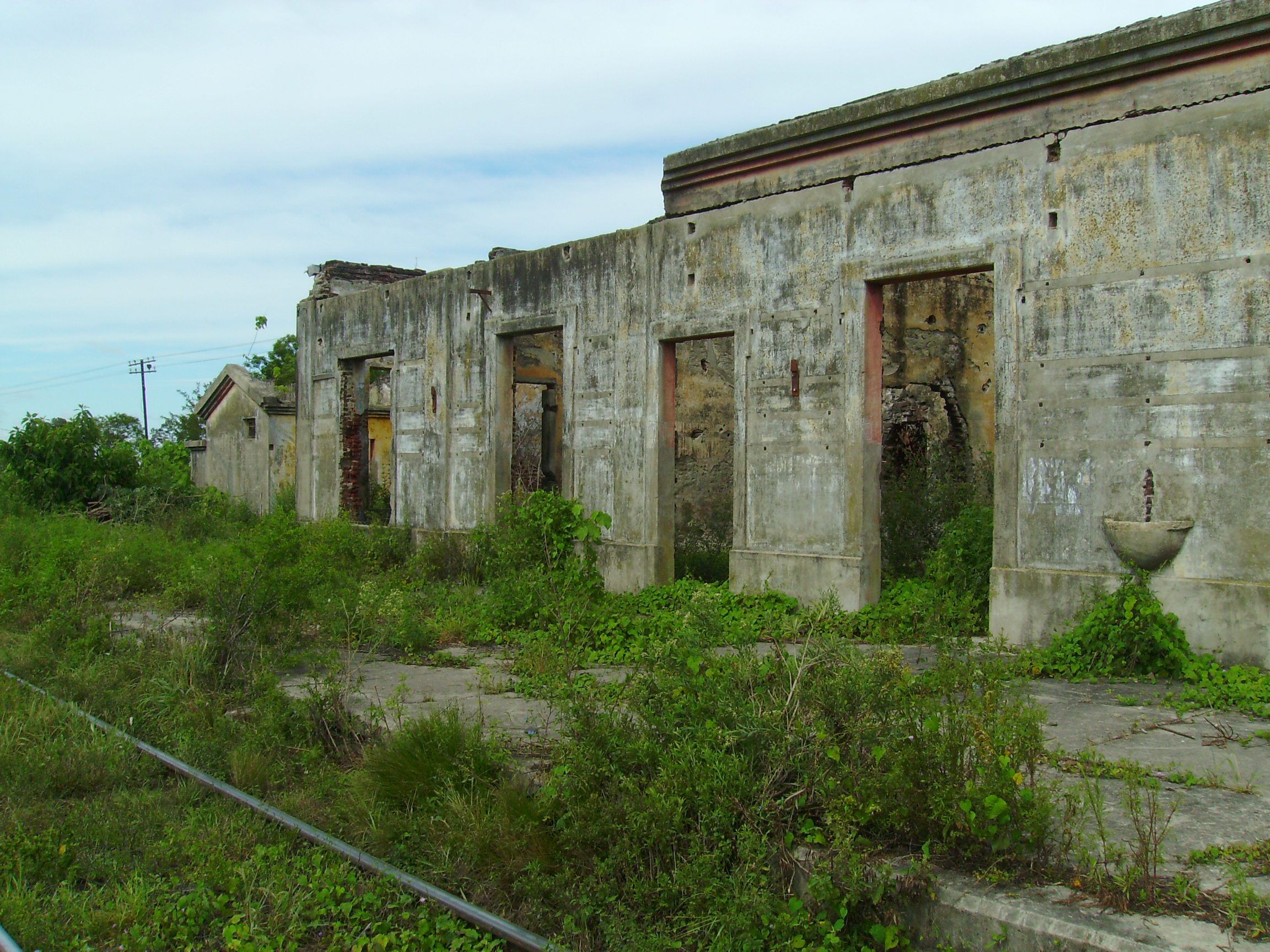
- Remains of the Station
- Interactive map of Estación Escriña
- Country: Argentina
- Province: Entre Ríos Province
- Time zone: UTC−3 (ART)

Estación Escriña is a village and municipality in Entre Ríos Province in north-eastern Argentina.
