= Aranguren, Argentina =

Aranguren
- Municipality and village
- Location within Argentina
- Coordinates: 32°14′33″S 60°9′41″W
- Country: Argentina
- Province: Entre Ríos Province

Government
  - Municipal President: Eduardo Tessore
- Elevation: 282 ft (86 m)

Population (2001)
  - Total: 1,581
- Time zone: UTC−3 (ART)
- Postal code: 3162
- Area code: 03436

Aranguren is a village and municipality in Entre Ríos Province in north-eastern Argentina.
