= Irazusta =

Coordinates: 32°56′S 58°57′W

- Municipality and village
- Interactive map of Irazusta
- Country: Argentina
- Province: Entre Ríos Province
- Time zone: UTC−3 (ART)

Irazusta is a village and municipality in Entre Ríos Province in north-eastern Argentina.
