= Villa Mantero =

Coordinates: 32°24′S 58°45′W

- Municipality and village
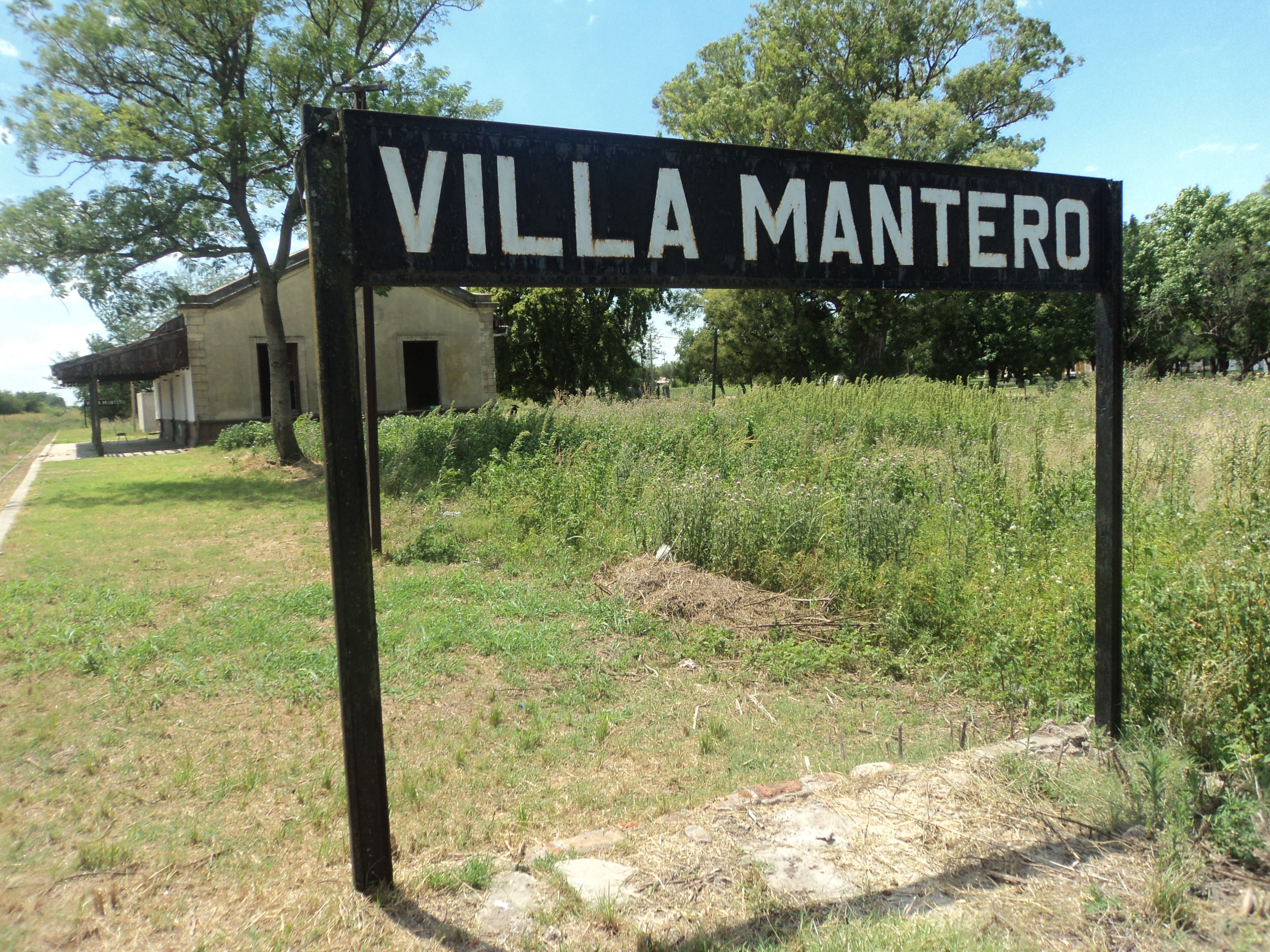
- Villa Mantero
- Interactive map of Villa Mantero
- Country: Argentina
- Province: Entre Ríos Province
- Time zone: UTC−3 (ART)

Villa Mantero is a village and municipality in Entre Ríos Province in north-eastern Argentina. The municipality includes the town of the same name and a rural area.

It is located 40 km from the town of Pronunciamiento, 30 from the town of Caseros, 50 km from Concepción del Uruguay and 15 km from Basavilbaso. Agro-industrial town, with big rice, corn and legumes mills.

== History ==
The oldest antecedent of this town is the San Pedro ranch, on its outskirts, properties of Justo José de Urquiza and his descendants for more than a century and a half. Here, the plot that culminated in the murder of Justo José de Urquiza, led by Sergeant Major Simón Luengo and Nicomedes Coronel, butler of the caudillo, took place.

After Urquiza's death, the properties was inherited by his daughter Justa, married to General Luis María Campos. The main house of San Pedro dates back to 1872, although the current Tudor residences was built on the original building in 1928 with the addition of splendid furniture. On October 19, 1876, Argentine Law No. 817 on Immigration and Colonization was passed, known as the "Avellaneda Law", with which the history of the massive European colonization in Argentina begins. This law refers in its first part to immigration and, in the second, to colonization. But this was not enough, it was necessary to open trade, exploit natural resources; land, minerals, livestock, and the vast plains had to be populated with industrious hands.

With regard to Entre Ríos, the Executive Power authorized by Law of June 11, 1883 the construction and operation of a European standard gauge railway, from Paraná to Concepción del Uruguay, passing through Nogoyá and Rosario del Tala, being contracted for the Lucas Gonzales & Cía. At kilometer 235,650 the station 1 ° de Mayo was located. It was founded on September 29, 1893, and its founder was Juan Miguel Seró. It was born as a Development Board (or 2nd category municipality) on October 26, 1916.

As of December 10, 2011, it became a municipality.
