= Colonia Baylina =

Coordinates: 31°47′57″S 58°33′07″W

- Municipality and village
- Interactive map of Colonia Baylina
- Country: Argentina
- Province: Entre Ríos Province
- Time zone: UTC−3 (ART)

Colonia Baylina is a village and municipality in Entre Ríos Province in north-eastern Argentina.
