= Entre Ríos Province =

Province of Argentina

Entre Ríos
- Province
- Province of Entre Ríos; Provincia de Entre Ríos (Spanish)
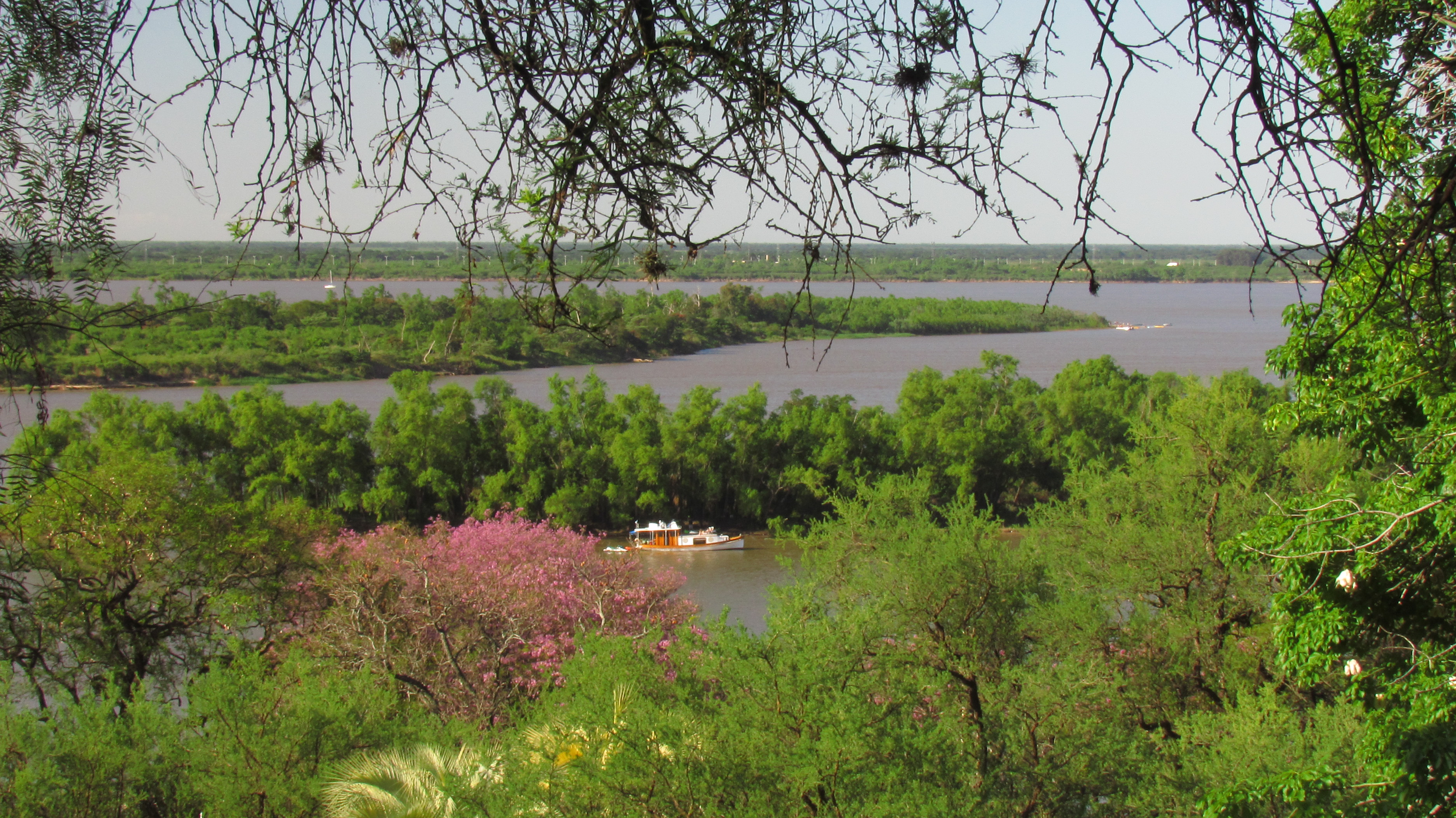
- View of the Paraná River

- Flag Coat of arms
- Motto: Federación, libertad y fuerza (Spanish) "Federation, freedom and strength"
- Anthem: Marcha de Entre Ríos (Spanish) "March of Entre Ríos"
- Location of Entre Ríos within Argentina
- Coordinates: 32.1°S 59.3°W
- Country: Argentina
- Departments: 17
- Municipalities and board of governors: 266
- Capital: Paraná

Government
  - Governor: Rogelio Frigerio (PRO)
  - Vice Governor: Alicia Aluani (PRO)
  - Legislature: Senate (17); Chamber of Deputies (34)
  - National Deputies: 9
  - National Senators: Alfredo de Angeli (PRO); Edgardo Kueider (FDT); Stella Maris Olalla (UCR)

Area Ranked 17th
  - Total: 78,781 km^{2} (30,418 sq mi)

Population (2022 census)
  - Total: 1,426,426
  - Rank: 8th
  - Density: 18.106/km^{2} (46.895/sq mi)
- Demonym: entrerriano

GDP
  - Total: peso 292 billion (US$11.2 billion) (2018)
- Time zone: UTC−3 (ART)
- ISO 3166 code: AR-E
- HDI (2021): 0.836 very high (20th)
- Website: entrerios.gov.ar

Entre Ríos (Spanish pronunciation: [ˈentɾe ˈri.os], 'Between Rivers') is a central province of Argentina, located in the Mesopotamia region. It borders the provinces of Buenos Aires (south), Corrientes (north) and Santa Fe (west), and Uruguay in the east.

Its capital is Paraná (391,000 inhabitants), which lies on the Paraná River, opposite the city of Santa Fe.

Together with Córdoba and Santa Fe, since 1999, the province is part of the economic-political association known as the Center Region.

== History ==
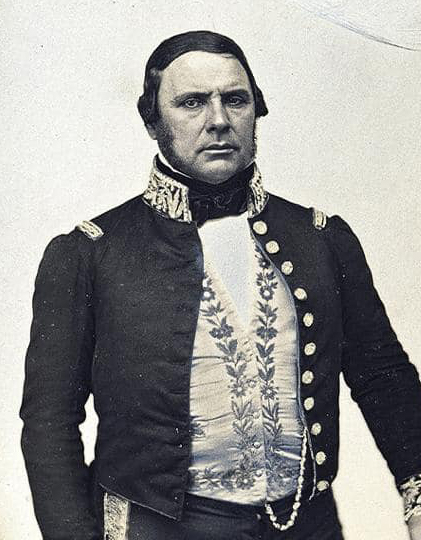
Justo José de Urquiza, general and politician who governed the province and led the Federalist Party.

The first inhabitants of the area that is now Entre Ríos were the Charrúa and Chaná who each occupied separate parts of the region. Spaniards entered in 1520, when Juan Rodríguez Serrano ventured up the Uruguay River searching for the Pacific Ocean.

The first permanent Spanish settlement was erected in the current La Paz Department at the end of the 16th century. As governor of Asunción first and then of Buenos Aires, Hernandarias conducted expeditions to Entre Ríos unexplored lands. Juan de Garay, after founding Santa Fe, explored this area, which he called la otra banda ("the other bank").

However, the region remained entirely indigenous and uninhabited by Europeans until a group of colonists from neighbouring Santa Fe Province settled on the Bajada del Paraná in the late seventeenth century, now the site of the provincial capital. At the same time towns appear, which we now know as Nogoyá, Victoria, Gualeguay, Gualeguaychú, Concepción del Uruguay and Concordia.

Tomás de Rocamora further explored the area in 1783 under the threat of a Portuguese invasion from Brazil, and gave official status to many of the above-mentioned towns. He was also the first to refer to the region as Entre Ríos. At this stage, European settlement was minimal, though during the May Revolution, the few colonists in the cities along the Paraná shore supported Manuel Belgrano and his army on his way to Paraguay.

On September 29, 1820, the leader (caudillo) Francisco Ramírez declared the territory an autonomous entity, the Republic of Entre Ríos. This lasted until his assassination on July 10 of the next year.

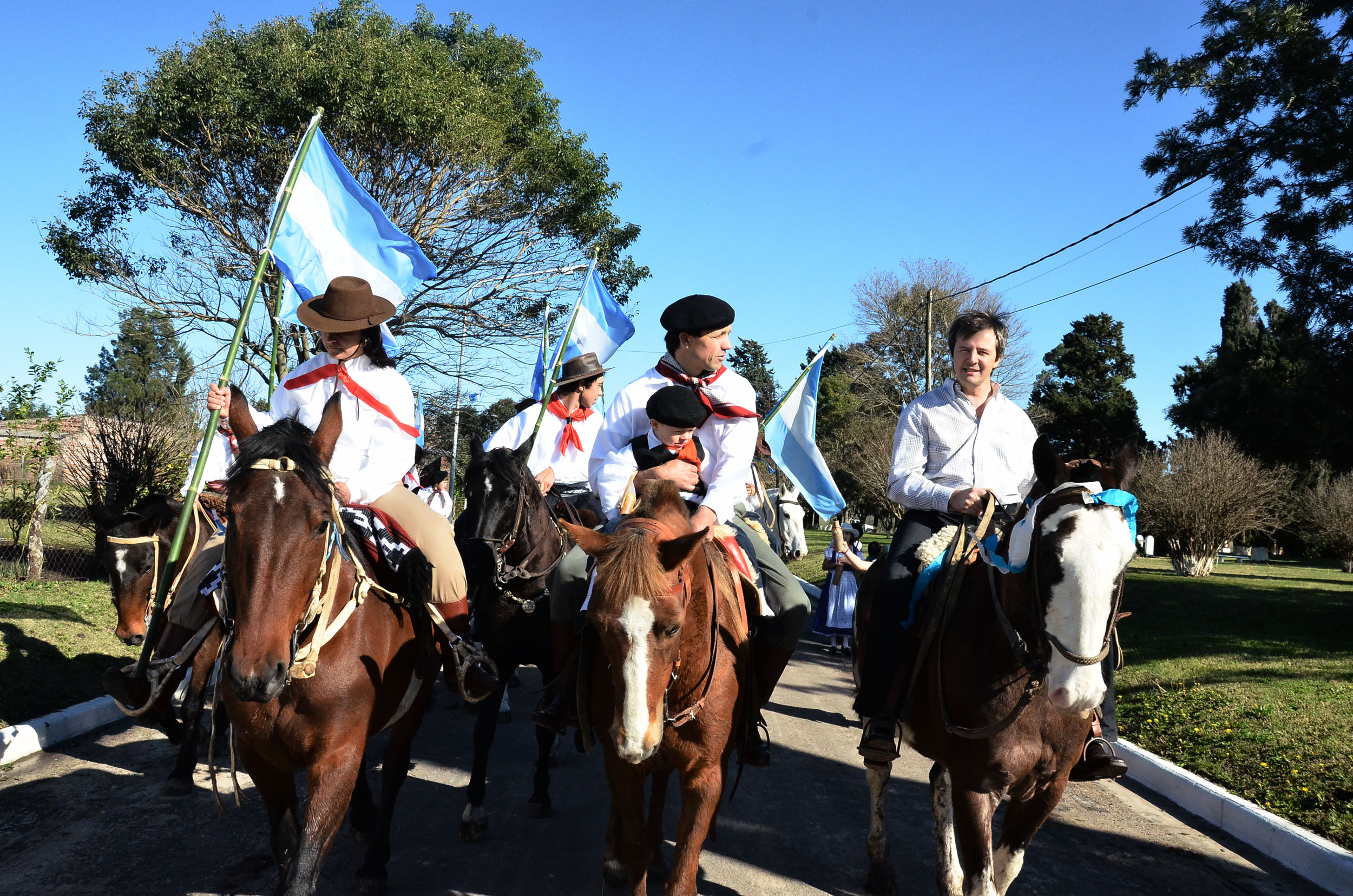
Descendants of Spaniards and Germans in Entre Ríos.

In 1853, in a meeting of all the provinces except Buenos Aires, Paraná was elected as the capital of the Argentine Confederation, and the Governor of Entre Ríos and leader (caudillo) Urquiza as its first president. The provincial capital was moved to Concepción del Uruguay. Later Urquiza, who had first won against Buenos Aires at the Battle of Cepeda in 1859, let his troops move back in the even Battle of Pavón in 1861, which allowed his rival Bartolomé Mitre from Buenos Aires to become president. At the time he was fulfilling his third term as governor of the province from 1860 to 1864 and after a voluntary interruption was reelected in 1868, but he was assassinated in 1870 after altogether 16 years of governing before finishing his mandate, which had probably been ordered by his supporter Ricardo López Jordán, not trusting him anymore.

Urquiza encouraged immigration through "colonization contracts", setting up many agricultural colonies with European (mainly Volga Germans, Russians (including Russian Jews and Poles), Italians, Swiss and French) settlers. According to data of the 1903 census, of the 425,373 inhabitants of the province, 153,067 were immigrants.

== Economy ==
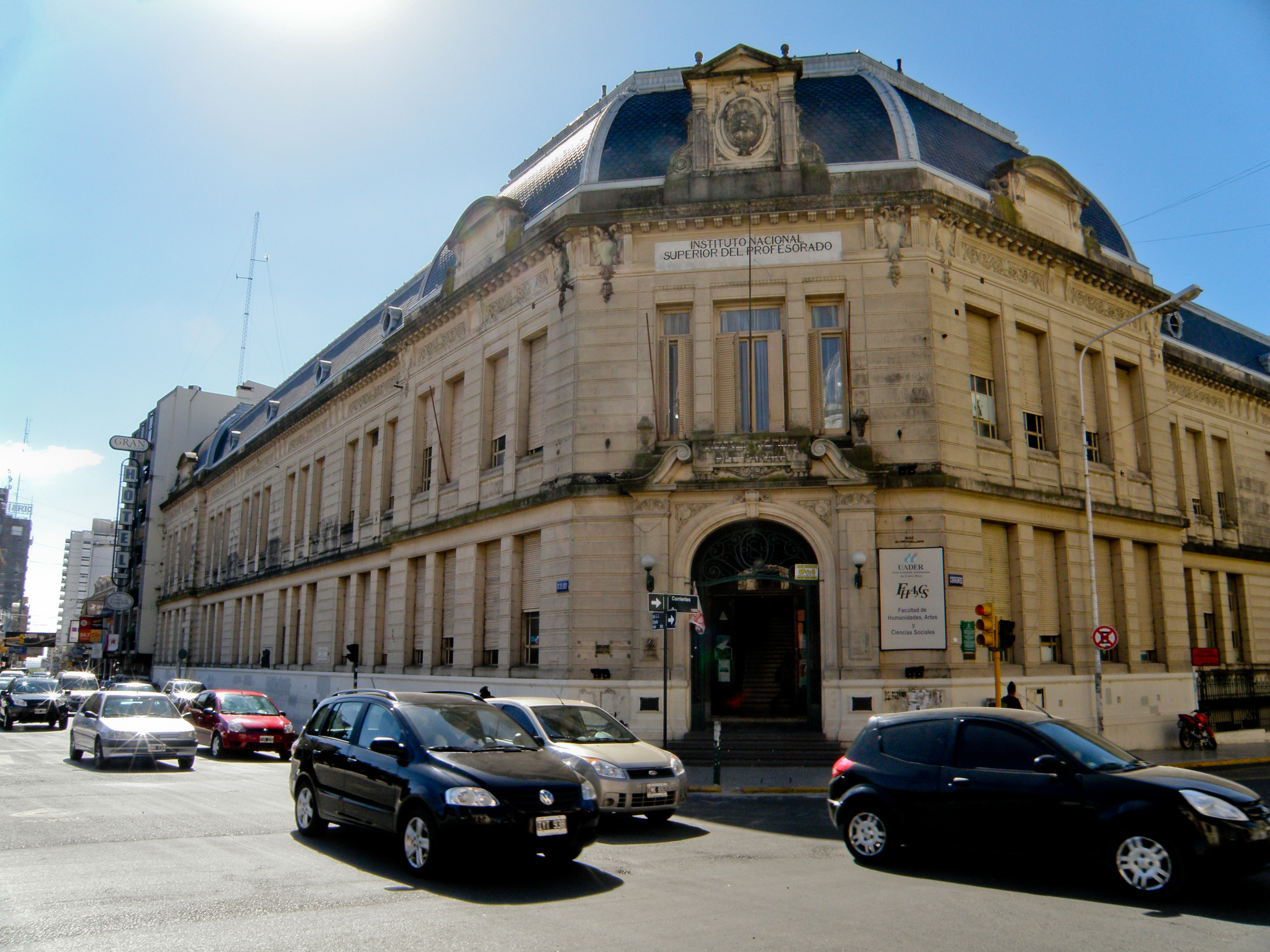
Institute of higher education.

Entre Rios' economy is the sixth largest in Argentina. Its output in 2006 was estimated at US$7.71 billion, or, US$6,710 per capita in 2006 (about a fourth less than the national average). In 2013, its output was estimated at $63.814 billion Pesos (about US$11.688 billion) or, 48,327 pesos (about US$8,851) per capita at current market prices. This was 21% below the average GDP per capita of 69,678 pesos (about US$12,762) for Argentina in 2013 at current market prices.

Its economy has long been more agricultural than the median in Argentina, comprising about 15% of output. Entre Rios' agricultural products include rice (60% of the national production), soybeans, wheat, maize, and citrus of which it is the second biggest producer, and exporting 16% of the production mainly to Europe. Livestock production focuses on cattle (4.5 million head), and in sheep production in a decreasing proportion, covering 60,000 km^{2}. The dairy industry, currently in expansion, produces almost 250 thousand tons per year of dairy products.

Of the national production of chickens and eggs, Entre Ríos contributes 37% of the first and 25% percent of the second. Another emerging production is honey and its derivatives, mainly for export.

Manufacturing has a sizable presence in Entre Rios, making up another 15% of output. Its industries are mostly linked to agriculture, as in food and drinks industry and flour and rice mills. Other industries include timber-wood, chemical, metallurgy, and machinery.

== Geography ==
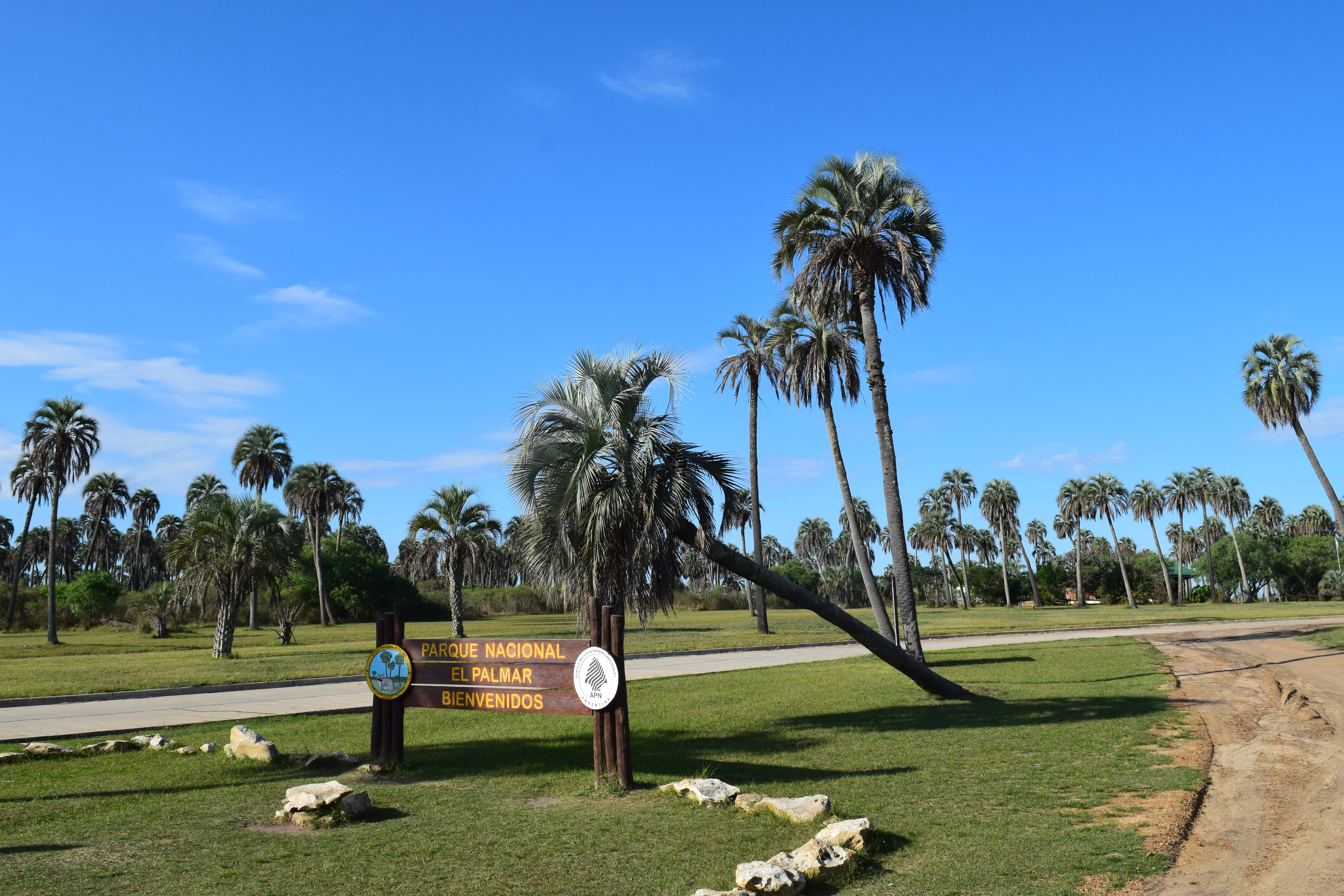
The El Palmar National Park.

As part of the Mesopotamic region, the land is almost completely flat, with hills some 100 meters in height. There are two main systems of low hills, called lomadas or cuchillas: the Cuchilla de Montiel (west) and the Cuchilla Grande (east), which are separated by the Gualeguay River.

The name of the province means "between rivers". Entre Ríos is limited and traversed by many rivers and streams: the Paraná River and its delta to the west and south; the Uruguay River and the Mocoretá River to the east; and the Guayquiraró River to the north.

Two national parks are located within the province: El Palmar National Park and Predelta National Park. There are also hot springs in several locations, especially along the basin of the Uruguay River, located in cities like Federación, Villa Elisa, Colón, etc.

=== Climate ===
Köppen climate map of Entre Ríos Province.

The climate of Entre Rios is subtropical throughout with no dry season. Under the Köppen climate classification system, the province is classed as having a humid subtropical climate (Cfa). The mean annual precipitation throughout the province is 1,000 mm or more.

Based on observational data from 1991-2020, across the entire province, the average seasonal mean maximum and minimum temperature across the summer months (December–February) are 31 °C (max) and 18 °C (min), with an average seasonal mean temperature of 24 °C. For the winter months (June–August), the average seasonal mean temperatures are 18 °C (max) and 7 °C (min) with an average seasonal mean temperature of 13 °C. Observed mean seasonal precipitation data for the same time period reports a mean seasonal precipitation of 371 mm in summer (December–February), 348 mm (March–May), 148 mm in winter (June–August) and 302 mm (September–November).

Differences exist within the climate of the province, with the northern parts being warmer than the central and southern parts, with the north experiencing more annual rainfall than the south, but with relatively dry winters, compared with southern parts of the province. but the south experiencing significantly more rainfall in the winter months particularly in the winter months (June–August). In the northern part of the province, towards the province of Corrientes, mean temperatures range from 13 °C in winter to 27 °C in summer, with a mean annual precipitation of 1,300 mm. In comparison, the climate of southern parts of the province, towards the province of Buenos Aires becomes slightly more temperate; mean temperatures range from 10 °C in winter to 26 °C in summer, with a mean annual precipitation of 1,000 mm with less variation in seasonal rainfall in winter.

== Government ==
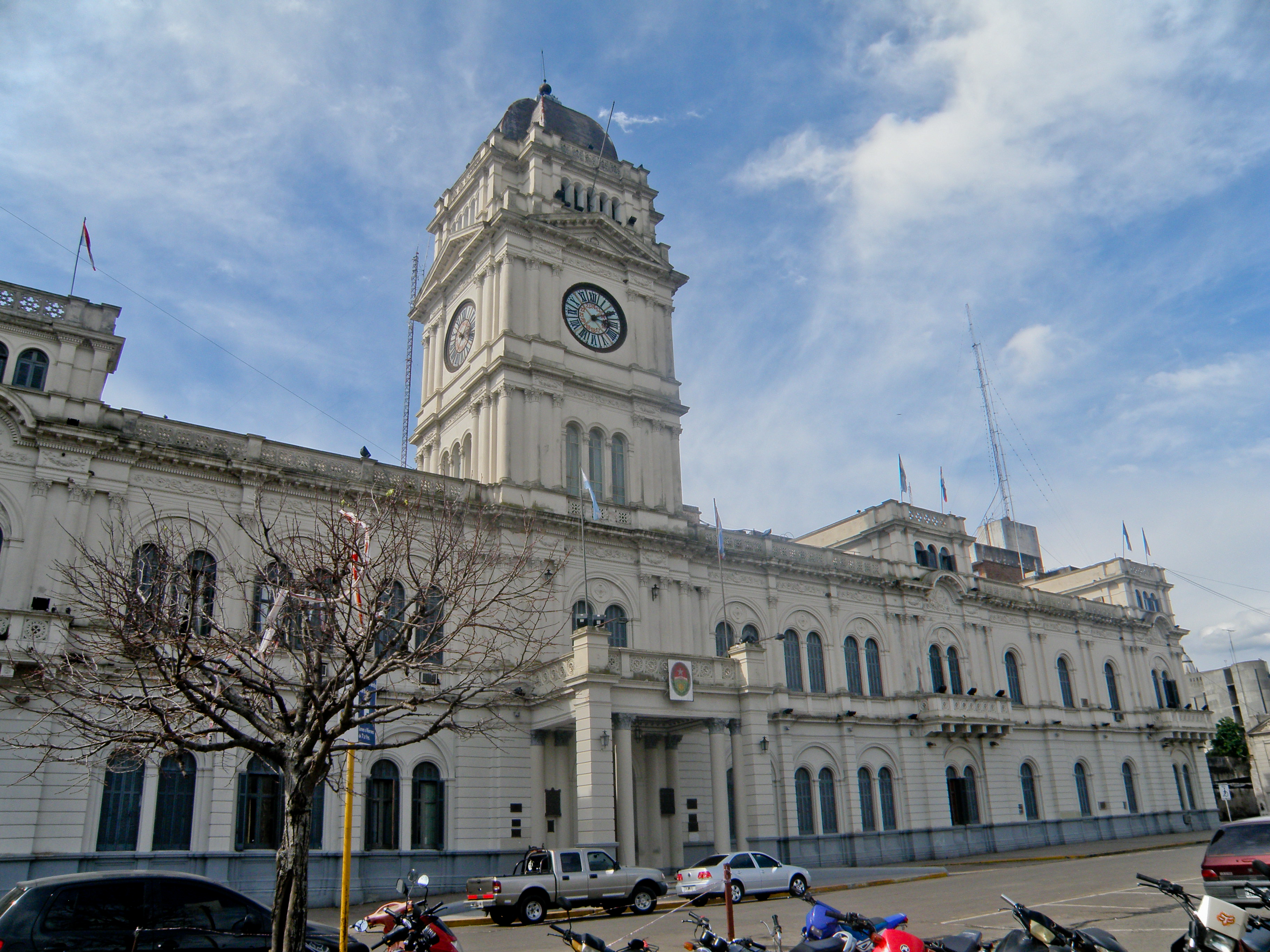
Legislature of Entre Ríos

The provincial government is divided into the usual three branches: the executive, headed by a popularly elected governor, who appoint the cabinet; the legislative; and the judiciary, headed by the Supreme Court. The legislative branch is a bicameral body composed of the Chamber of Deputies and the Senate. The Legislature is charged with introducing and passing local laws.

The Constitution of Entre Ríos Province forms the formal law of the province.

In Argentina, the most important law enforcement organization is the Argentine Federal Police but the additional work is carried out by the Entre Ríos Provincial Police.

== Political division ==
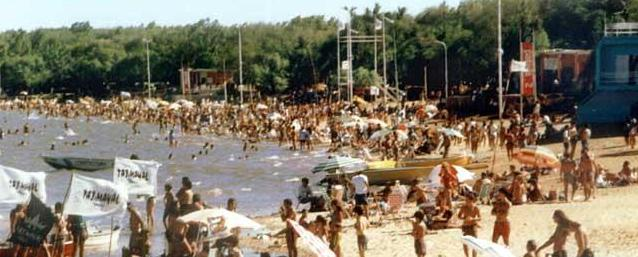
Pelay Beach on the Uruguay River, Concepción del Uruguay.

(Spanish: departamentos singular departamento).

The province is divided in 17 departments Department (Capital)

1. Colón (Colón)
2. Concordia (Concordia)
3. Diamante (Diamante)
4. Federación (Federación)
5. Federal (Federal)
6. Gualeguay (Gualeguay)
7. Gualeguaychú (Gualeguaychú)
8. Islas del Ibicuy (Villa Paranacito)
9. La Paz (La Paz)
10. Nogoyá (Nogoyá)
11. Paraná (Paraná)
12. San José de Feliciano (San José de Feliciano)
13. San Salvador (San Salvador)
14. Tala (Rosario del Tala)
15. Uruguay (Concepción del Uruguay)
16. Victoria (Victoria)
17. Villaguay (Villaguay)

== Villages ==
- Aldea Asunción
- Aldea San Francisco
- Antelo
- Aranguren
- Betbeder
- Cerrito
- Colonia Avigdor
- Colonia Baylina
- Colonia Oficial Nº 5
- Don Cristóbal Primero
- El Pingo
- Enrique Carbó
- Estación Camps
- Estación Escriña
- Estación Lazo
- Faustino M. Parera
- Gilbert
- Las Cuevas
- Las Moscas
- Los Charrúas
- Paso de la Arena
- Pastor Britos
- Pueblo Brugo
- Puerto Ibicuy
- Puntas del Gualeguaychú
- Tezanos Pinto
