= Aldea =

Aldea is a Spanish word meaning "village" or "hamlet".

It may refer to:

== People ==
- Alexander I Aldea (1397–1436), Prince of Wallachia
- Aurel Aldea (1887–1949), Romanian general and anti-communist resistance leader
- Bogdan Aldea (born 1981), Romanian football player
- Dan Andrei Aldea (1950–2020), Romanian rock multi-instrumentalist
- José Antonio Rodríguez Aldea (1779–1841), Chilean politician
- Juan de Dios Aldea (1853–1879), Chilean sailor
- Ramón Aldea (born 1932), Filipino archer

== Places ==
=== Antarctica ===
- Aldea Island, one of the Bugge Islands off the Antarctic Peninsula

=== Argentina ===
- Aldea Apeleg, a village and municipality in Chubut Province
- Aldea Asunción, a village and municipality in Entre Ríos Province
- Aldea Beleiro, a village and municipality in Chubut Province
- Aldea Epulef, a village and municipality in Chubut Province
- Aldea Escolar, a village and municipality in Chubut Province
- Aldea Protestante, a village in Entre Ríos Province
- Aldea Salto, a village in Entre Rios Province
- Aldea San Antonio, a village in Entre Rios Province
- Aldea San Francisco, a village in Entre Rios Province
- Aldea San Juan, a village in Entre Rios Province
- Aldea Spatzenkutter, a municipality in Entre Ríos Province
- Aldea Valle María, a municipality in Entre Ríos Province

=== Chile ===
- Aldea Island, in the Campana Archipelago of southern Chile
- Puerto Aldea, a village near Tongoy, Elqui Province, Coquimbo Region

=== Mexico ===
- La Aldea, a community in Silao, Guanajuato

=== Romania ===
- Aldea, a village in Mărtiniș Commune, Harghita County

=== Spain ===
- Aldea de El Quejigal, a village Albacete Province, Castile-La Mancha
- Aldea de Fuente Carrasca, a village in Albacete Province, Castile-La Mancha
- Aldea de San Miguel, a municipality in Valladolid Province, Castile and León
- Aldea de Las Hoyas, a village in Albacete Province, Castile-La Mancha
- Aldea de Mesones, a village in Albacete Province, Castile-La Mancha
- Aldea de Pinilla, a village in Albacete Province, Castile-La Mancha
- Aldea del Cano, a municipality in Cáceres Province, Extremadura
- Aldea del Fresno, a municipality in the Commune of Madrid
- Aldea del Pinar, a village in Burgos Province, Castilla y León
- Aldea del Rey, a municipality in Ciudad Real Province, Castile-La Mancha
- Aldea en Cabo, a municipality Toledo Province, Castile-La Mancha
- L'Aldea, a municipality in Catalonia
- La Aldea de San Nicolás, a village on Gran Canaria
- La Aldea del Obispo, a municipality in Cáceres Province, Extremadura

== Ships ==
- Chilean destroyer Aldea (1928), a destroyer of Chilean Navy, (1928–1967)
- Chilean tug Aldea (ATF-63), an ocean tug of the Chilean Navy, formerly USS Arikara (1943–1992)
- Chilean ship Sargento Aldea (LSDH-91), an amphibious assault ship of the Chilean Navy, formerly the French ship Foudre (1988–)

== Other uses ==
- Aldea (restaurant), a former restaurant in Manhattan, New York
- Aldea, a level of administrative division in Honduras
- Aldea Tic, a Colombian TV show hosted by Uribe DJ
- Aldeas Infantiles SOS, Spanish for SOS Children's Villages, an international development organisation
- Autódromo Aldea Romana, a motorsports circuit Buenos Aires, Argentina
- Sargento Aldea, a station on the Valparaíso Metro in Chile
- Aldea, a fictional planet in Star Trek: The Next Generation (episode 1.17: "When the Bough Breaks")
