= Expedición Robinson (Argentine TV series) =

- Created by: Charlie Parsons
- Country of origin: Argentina
- Original language: Spanish
- No. of seasons: 2

Original release
- Network: Canal 13
- Release: 2000 – 2001

Related
- Survivor

Expedición Robinson is a television show that aired in Argentina from 2000 to 2001 and was the first edition of Robinson, or Survivor as it is referred to in some countries to air in South America. The show was not a success in Argentina and after only two seasons the show was canceled. The name alludes to both Robinson Crusoe and The Swiss Family Robinson, two stories featuring people marooned by shipwrecks.

== Format ==
The Robinson format was developed by Planet 24, a United Kingdom TV production company owned by Charlie Parsons and Bob Geldof. Their company Castaway Television Productions retained the rights to the concept when they sold Planet 24 in 1999. Mark Burnett later licensed the format to create the American show Survivor in 2000.

Sixteen contestants are put into a survival situation and compete in a variety of physical challenges. Early in each season three teams compete but later on the teams are merged and the competitions become individual. At the end of each show one contestant is eliminated from the show by the others in a secret "island council" ballot.

== Series ==
- Expedición Robinson 2000
- Expedición Robinson 2001
- Survivor, Expedición Robinson 2024
