= Mesopotamia, Argentina =

Region in Argentina

The Mesopotamia (land between rivers), the area between the Paraná and the Uruguay rivers

The Mesopotamia or Región Mesopotámica is the humid and verdant area of northeast Argentina, comprising the provinces of Misiones, Entre Ríos, and Corrientes. The landscape and its characteristics are dominated by two rivers: the Paraná and the Uruguay.

When Spanish settlers came to the area, the two parallel rivers and the lush area between them drew comparisons to Mesopotamia (Ancient Greek: Μεσοποταμία, 'land between rivers') in modern-day Iraq, and it was decided that the Argentine region be named after the Iraqi region. The region shares many of its ecological features with neighboring regions of Argentina and with parts of Brazil, Paraguay, and Uruguay.

Mesopotamia has some of the most popular tourist attractions in Argentina, mainly the Iguazú Falls, the Iguazú National Park, and the Jesuit mission stations in Misiones. The Iberá Wetlands in Corrientes are an extensive area of flooded forest similar to Brazil's Pantanal.

The region is part of the Brazilian central plateau. The whole region has high rainfall, particularly in August and September, up to 2,000 mm annually. Misiones, in the northern part of Mesopotamia, is largely covered by subtropical forest, with caiman, toucans, and monkeys. Fast decomposition of organic matter gives the area a red soil with only a thin fertile layer that can easily be washed away. Corrientes is marshy and wooded, with low hills. Entre Ríos is covered with fertile pasture land that stretches into Uruguay.

The flora of Mesopotamia includes the yatay palm (Syagrus yatay, Butia yatay), which is a protected species in the El Palmar National Park, and the Araucaria angustifolia (Paraná pine tree). Tree ferns, orchids, and large trees can also be found.

Yerba mate (Ilex paraguariensis) is grown largely in Mesopotamia; 1,800 square kilometres of Misiones are devoted to its production. The region is also important for cattle and sheep, poultry, linseed, tobacco, citrus, and rice.

Gualeguaychú in Entre Ríos is popular for its carnival at the beginning of Lent. Corrientes is also known for its carnival celebrations and is a centre of music and festivals generally: the chamamé music style has recently seen a resurgence in popularity.

The region called Litoral (Spanish for 'coastal') consists of the Mesopotamia and the provinces of Chaco, Formosa, and Santa Fe.

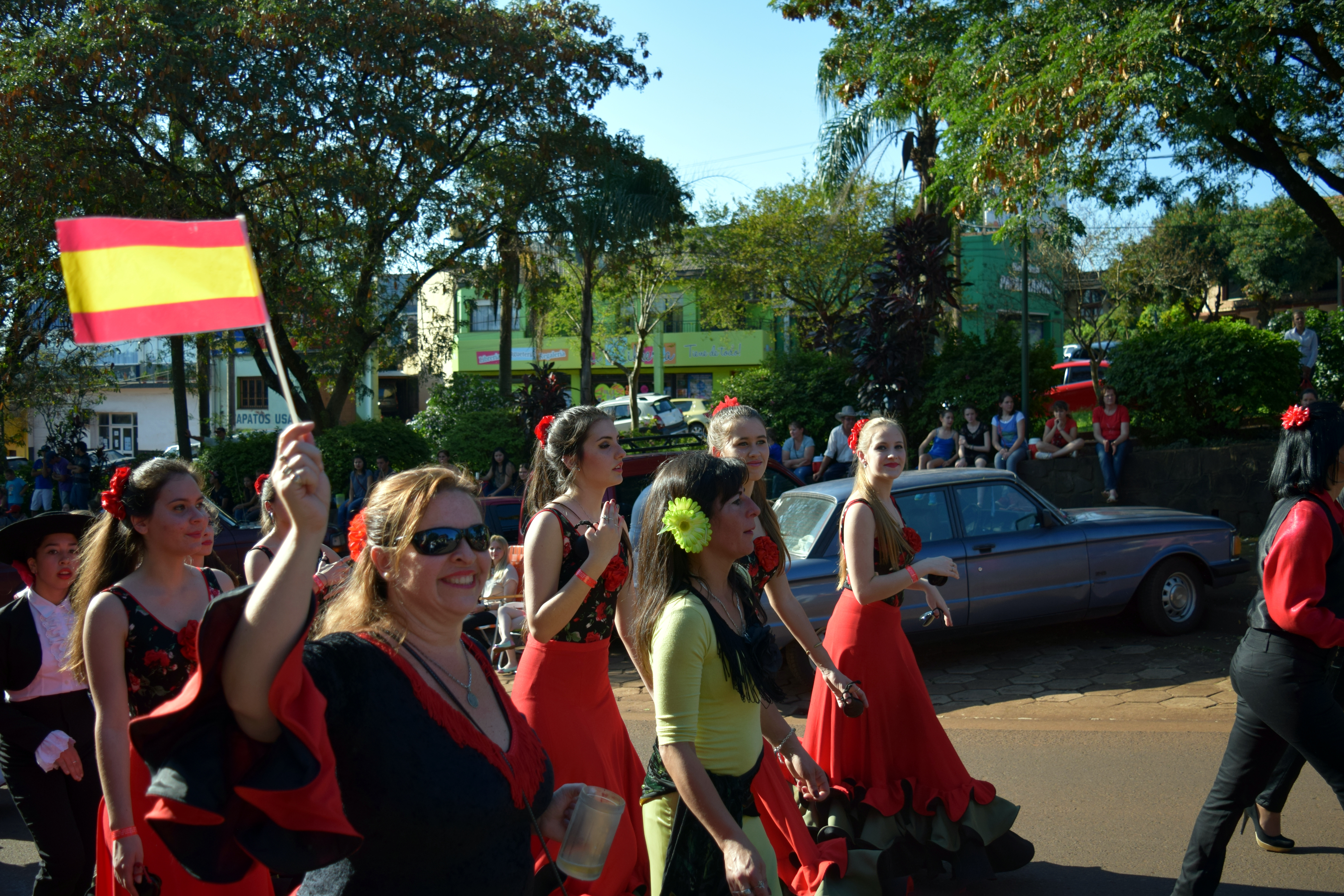
Argentines of Spanish descent during the Immigrant's Festival in Oberá, Misiones

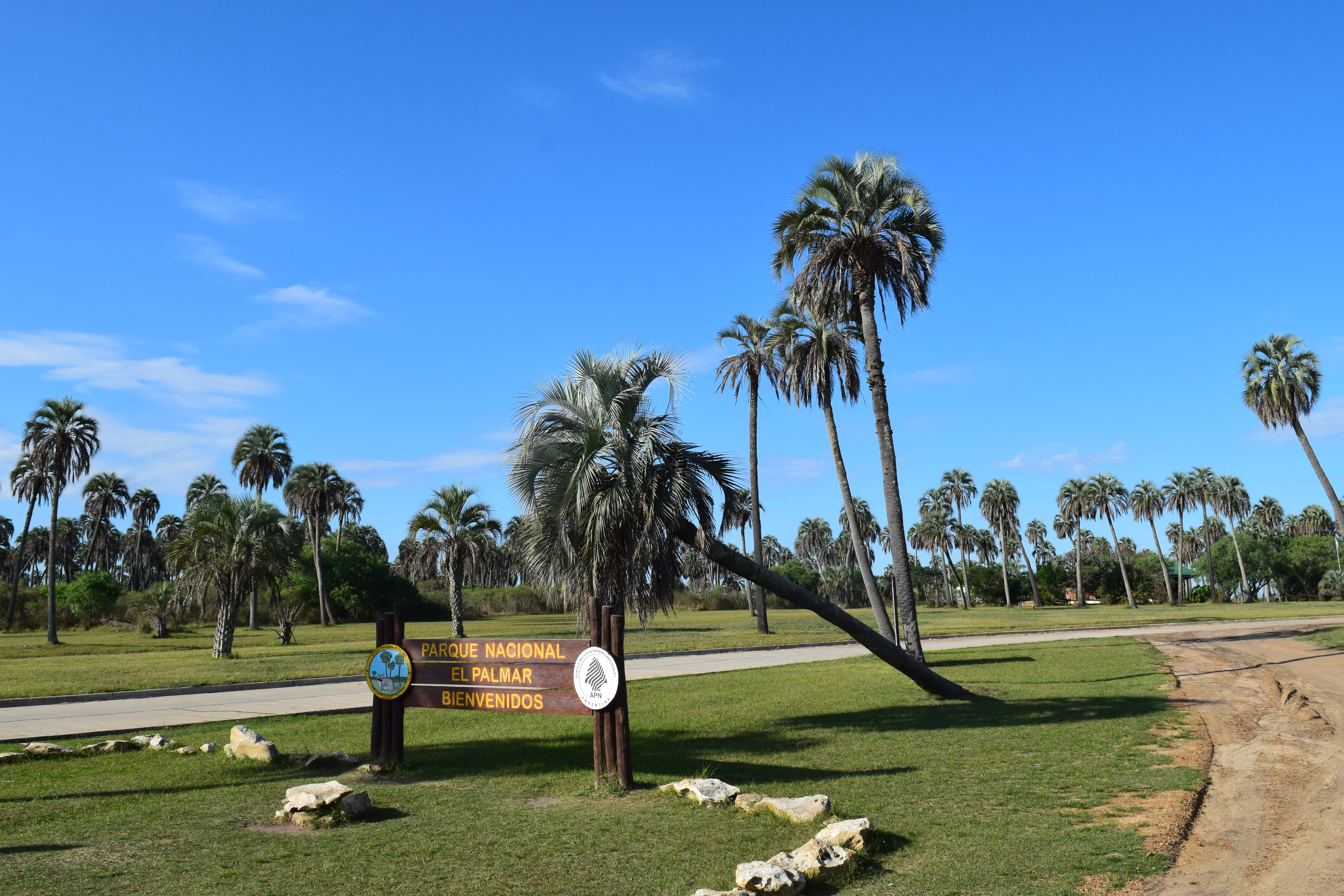
The El Palmar National Park, Entre Ríos

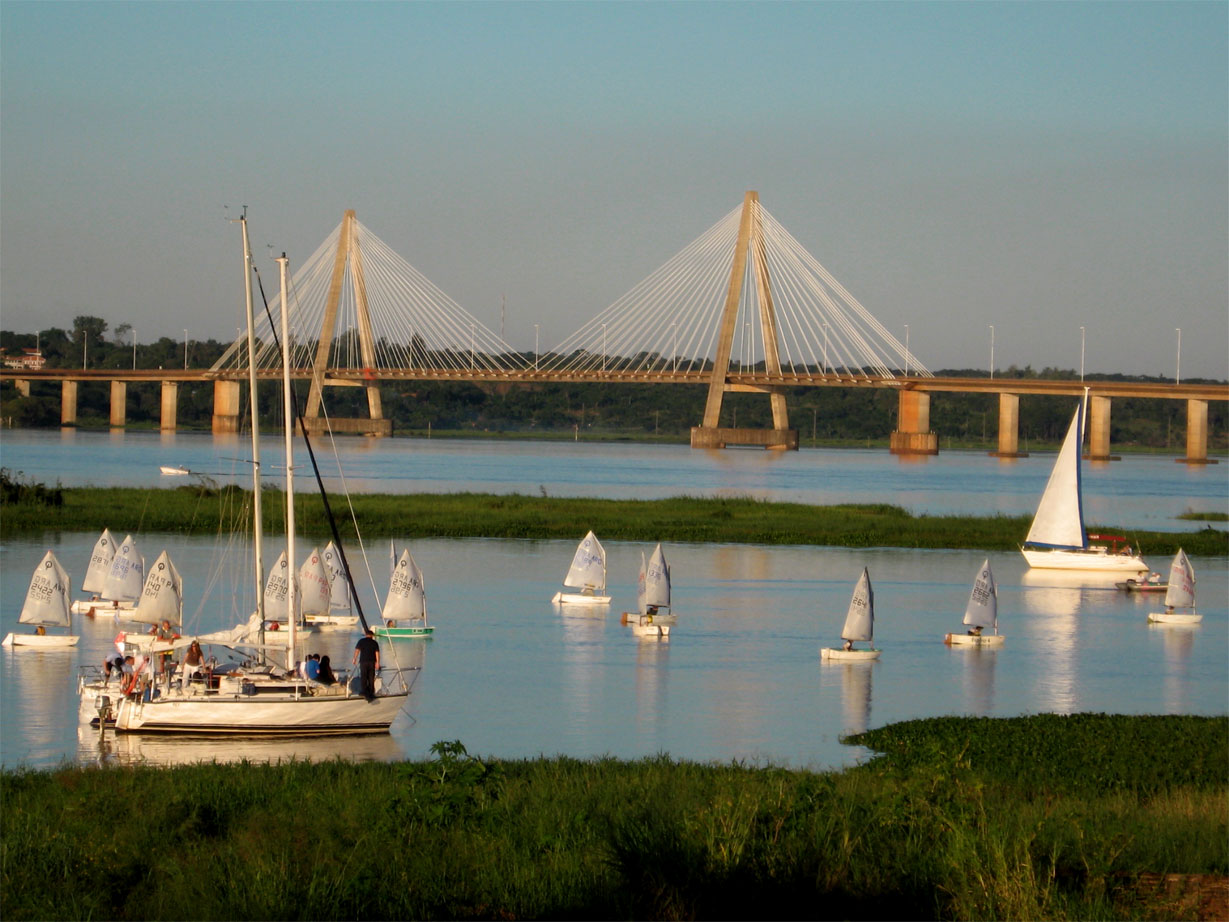
San Roque Gonzalez Bridge, linking Posadas, Argentina and Encarnación, Paraguay

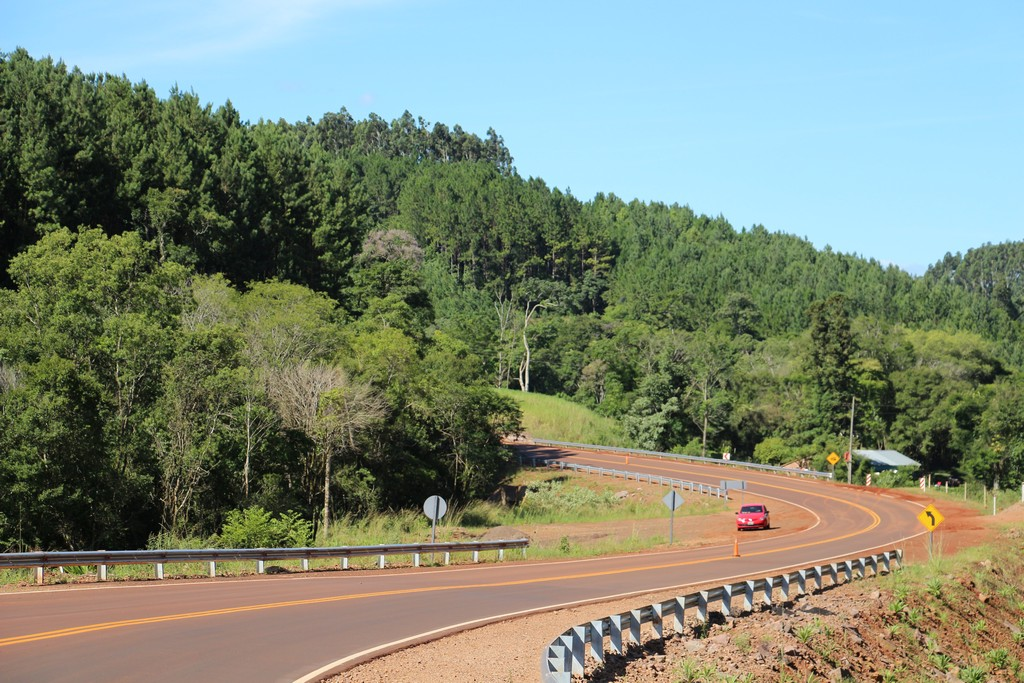
Provincial Route 8 near Veinticinco de Mayo, Misiones

== Climate ==
Mesopotamia has a subtropical climate with no dry season. Under the Köppen climate classification, it has a humid subtropical climate (Cfa). The main features of the climate are high temperatures and abundant rainfall throughout the year. Rainfall is abundant throughout the year, because much of this region lies north of the subtropical high pressure belt, even in winter, meaning that it is exposed to moist easterly winds from the Atlantic Ocean throughout the year. With abundant precipitation throughout the year, water deficiencies and extended periods of droughts are uncommon and much of the region has a positive water balance.

=== Precipitation ===
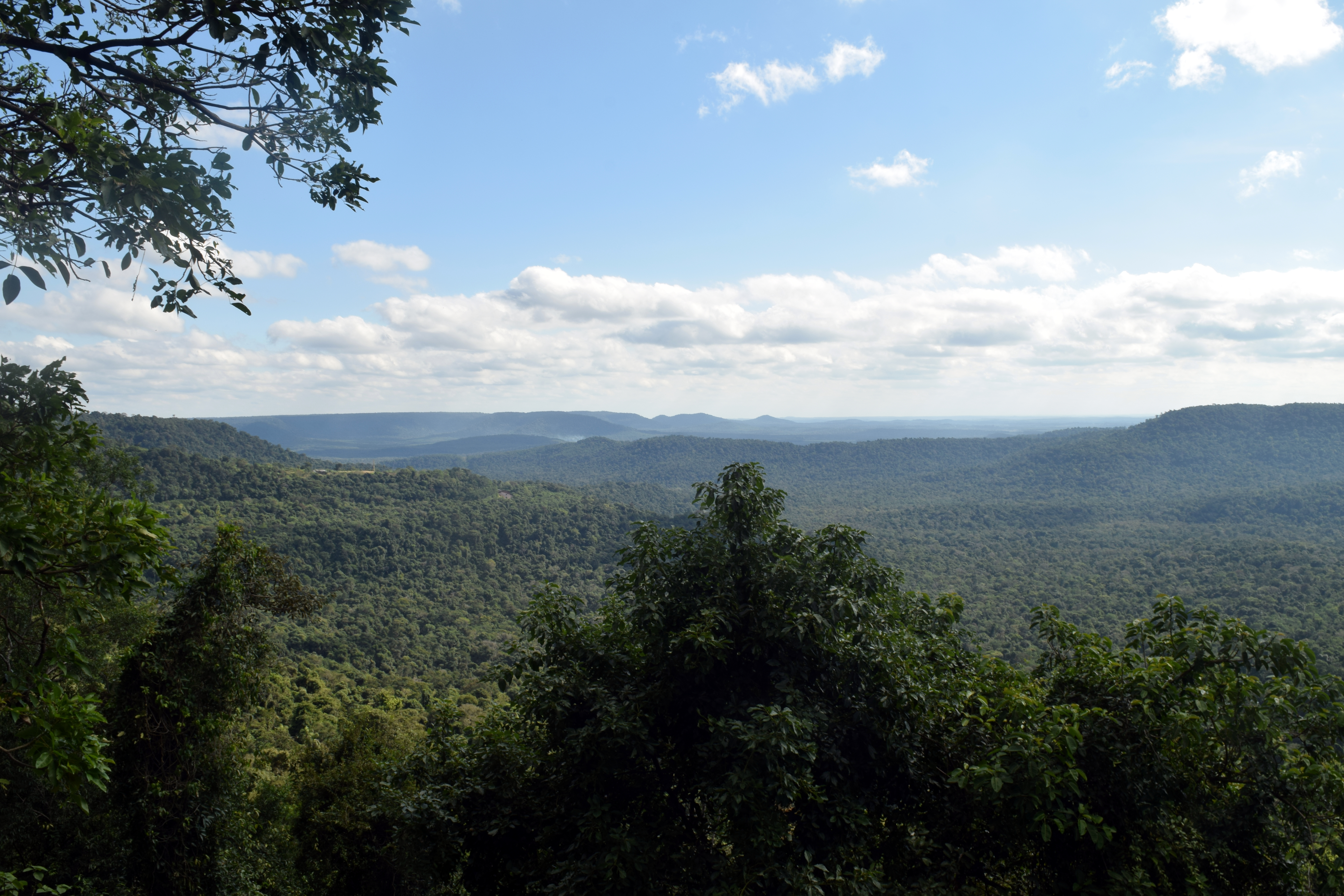
View of the Alto Paraná Atlantic forests in the Misiones Province.

With the exception of Misiones Province which receives abundant precipitation throughout the year, precipitation is slightly higher in summer than in winter and generally decreases from east to west and from north to south. Average annual precipitation ranges from less than 1,000 mm (39 in) in the southern parts to approximately 1,800 mm (71 in) in the eastern parts of Misiones province. Summers (December–February) are one of the most humid seasons with an average precipitation of 350 mm (14 in) in these months although it can range from a low of 300 mm (12 in) to a high of 450 mm (18 in). Most of the rainfall during summer falls during convective thunderstorms. Fall (March–May) is one of the rainiest seasons with many places receiving over 350 mm (14 in). This can vary from a high of 480 mm (19 in) in Misiones province to less than 180 mm (7.1 in). As in summer, much of the precipitation falls during convective thunderstorms. Winter (June–August) is the driest season with a mean precipitation of only 110 mm (4.3 in). Mean winter precipitation ranges from less than 40 mm (1.6 in) in the west to over 340 mm (13 in) in the eastern parts. Unlike summer and spring where precipitation mainly falls from convective thunderstorms, most of the precipitation during winter comes from frontal systems, particularly the Sudestada which often bring long periods of precipitation, cloudiness, cooler temperatures and strong winds. Spring (September–November) is similar to fall, with a mean precipitation of 340 mm (13 in).

=== Temperatures ===
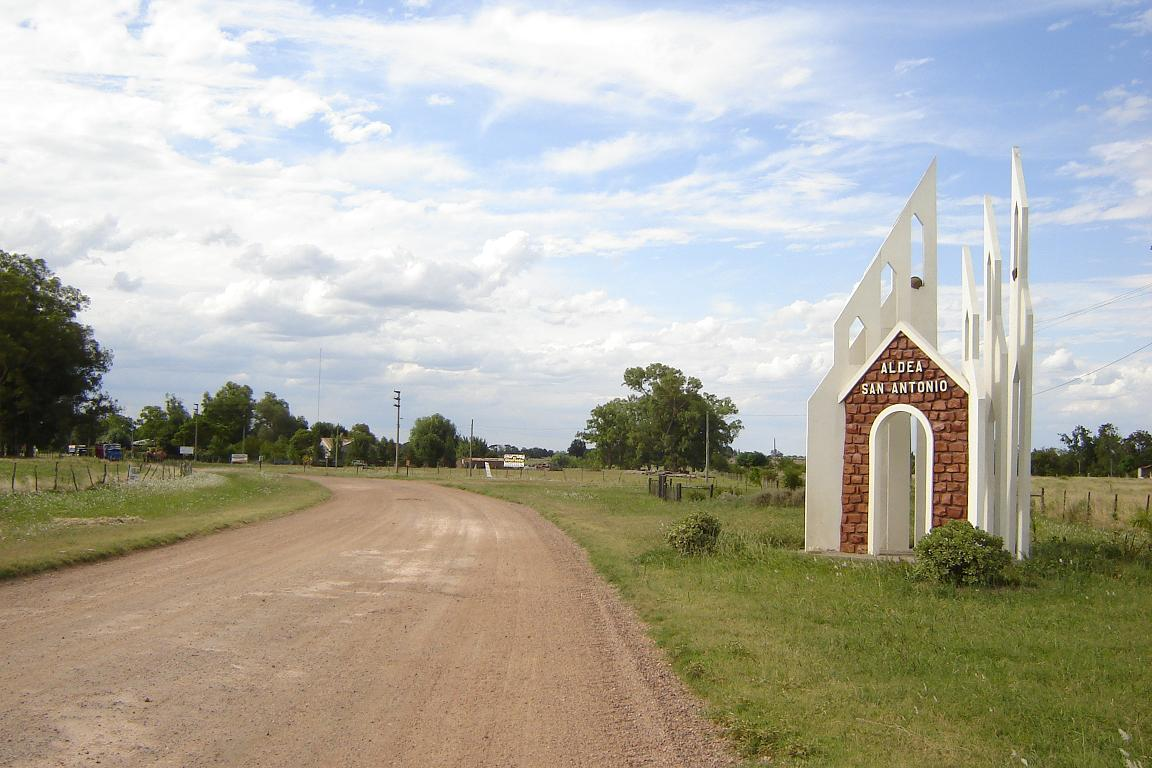
Humid plain in Aldea San Antonio, Entre Ríos.

Summers are very hot, and owing to abundant rainfall very humid, while winters feature mild to warm weather. As a whole, the region has high temperatures throughout the year. The northern areas are warmer than the southern parts. In Misiones province, mean annual temperatures range between 18.3 °C (64.9 °F) in Bernardo de Irigoyen to 21.2 °C (70.2 °F) in Posadas. The lower mean annual temperature recorded in Bernardo de Irigoyen, despite being located further north than Posadas is due to its higher altitude, resulting in a cooler climate. In Corrientes Province, mean annual temperatures range from 19.7 °C (67.5 °F) in Curuzú Cuatía in the south to 22.2 °C (72.0 °F). The southern parts of Corrientes province have cooler temperatures and have a climate more similar to Entre Ríos Province, where mean annual temperatures range from 17 °C (62.6 °F) in the south to 20 °C (68.0 °F) in the north. During heat waves, temperatures can exceed 40 °C (104.0 °F) in the summer months while in the winter months, cold air masses from the south can push temperatures below freezing causing frost. However, such cold fronts tend to be brief and are less intense than areas further south or at higher altitudes. Snowfall is extremely rare and mainly confined to the uplands of Misiones province, where the last significant snowfall occurred in 1975 in Bernado de Irigoyen.

== Bibliography ==
- Lewis, Daniel (2001). The History of Argentina. United States: Palgrave Macmillan. ISBN 1-4039-6254-5.
- Fittkau, E.; Illies, J.; Klinge, H.; Schwabe, G. (1969). Biogeography and Ecology in South America. Springer. ISBN 978-94-011-9731-1.
