= Chilean ship Aldea =

Aldea is the name of the following ships of the Chilean Navy:

- Chilean destroyer Aldea, a Serrano-class destroyer in commission 1929–1957
- Chilean tug Aldea, ex-USS Arikara, an Abnaki-class tug launched in 1943, in service with Chile 1971–1992, sunk as target in 1992

== See also ==
- Aldea (disambiguation)
- Chilean ship Sargento Aldea
