= Bugge Islands =

Small group of Antarctic islands

- Location within Antarctica

Geography
- Location: Antarctica
- Coordinates: 69°12′S 68°25′W

Administration
- Administered under the Antarctic Treaty System

Demographics
- Population: Uninhabited

The Bugge Islands are a small group of ice-covered islands lying close off the front of Wordie Ice Shelf and between 7 and 20 km (4 and 11 nmi) northwest of Mount Guernsey, off the west coast of the Antarctic Peninsula. They were first seen from the air and photographed by the British Graham Land Expedition in 1936, and later roughly mapped from the photographs. They were observed in 1947 from the Port of Beaumont, Texas by the Ronne Antarctic Research Expedition (RARE) under Finn Ronne, who named these islands for his niece, Ruth Bugge, who supplied woolen clothing from Norway for the RARE. The group was also visited by the Chilean Antarctic Expedition, 1947, which named the islands Isla Aldea, Isla Eleuterio Ramírez, Isla Latorre, after heroes of the naval battle of Iquique.

From North to South the islands of the group are:

- Ramírez Island 69°9′S 68°27′W
- Aldea Island 69°13′S 68°30′W
- Landrum Island 69°14′S 68°20′W

== See also ==
- List of Antarctic and sub-Antarctic islands
