= Survivor, Expedición Robinson 2024 =

- Season 3
- Presented by: Alejandro "Marley" Wiebe
- No. of days: 60
- No. of castaways: 25
- Winner: Eugenia Propedo
- Runner-up: Baltasar López Barraza
- Location: Darién Gap, Capurganá, Colombia
- No. of episodes: 61

Release
- Original network: Telefe
- Original release: 15 July – 11 October 2024

Season chronology
- ← Previous; 2001

Survivor, Expedición Robinson 2024 is the third season and the first season since 2001 of the Argentine reality television series Expedición Robinson. The season is filmed in the Darién Gap, around the town of Capurganá in Colombia where for 60 days, 25 Argentines compete against each other for rewards, immunity and to avoid tribal council.

The season is hosted by Alejandro "Marley" Wiebe who at the end, grants the winner the grand prize of $50,000,000 and the title of Sole Survivor. The season premiered on Telefe and Disney+ on 15 July 2024. The season concluded on 11 October 2024 with a live finale where Eugenia Propedo won against Baltasar López Barraza in a 7-5 jury vote to claim the grand prize and the title of Sole Survivor.

== Contestants ==
List of Survivor, Expedición Robinson 2024 contestants
Contestant	Original Tribe	Merged Tribe	Finish	Island of the Dead
Braian Zárate; 28, Villa Fiorito	South Team		1st Voted Out; Day 3	
Maria "Maru" Corona Vavoudis; 32, Rosario	North Team		2nd Voted Out; Day 5	
Martín Lobo; 53, Caballito	North Team		3rd Voted Out; Day 7	
Gabriel Velazquez; 25, San Francisco Solano	North Team		4th Voted Out; Day 10	
Malvina Ramírez; 51, Rivadavia	South Team		5th Voted Out; Day 13	
Tomás Piñero; 28, Nueve de Julio	North Team		6th Voted Out; Day 15	
Giselle Margonari; 42, Núñez	South Team (Note: Giselle was the first to lose the first challenge so she had to wait for Samanta, winner of the first challenge of the season, to decide whether Giselle would join the South or North Team. Eventually Samanta decided that he would unite the South Team.)		7th Voted Out; Day 18	
Samanta Herdt; 27, Aldea Protestante	South Team		8th Voted Out; Day 20	
Julieta Clemente; 24, Sarmiento	North Team		9th Voted Out; Day 23	
Janet Duarte; 28, La Boca	South Team		10th Voted Out; Day 26	
Agustín Monzón; 22, Santa Fe	North Team		11th Voted Out; Day 28	Lost Duel; Day 31
Martín "Colli" Collante; Returned to Game	North Team		12th Voted Out; Day 30	Won Duel; Day 31
Fiorela Fraccaro; 32, Bragado	North Team	Gauchos del Caribe	13th Voted Out; 1st Jury Member; Day 33	
Inés Lucero; 30, Río Grande	North Team (Note: Inés and Eugenia exchange tribes temporarily on the twenty-fifth day.)	Gauchos del Caribe	14th Voted Out; 2nd Jury Member; Day 35	
Juan Pablo "Goldi" Goldie; 35, La Calera	South Team	Gauchos del Caribe	15th Voted Out; 3rd Jury Member; Day 38	
Francisco "Franchu" Pardo; 34, Banfield	South Team	Gauchos del Caribe	16th Voted Out; 4th Jury Member; Day 40	
Iván Chirinian; 29, Buenos Aires	South Team	Gauchos del Caribe	17th Voted Out; 5th Jury Member; Day 43	
Malena Kerschen; 27, Buenos Aires	North Team	Gauchos del Caribe	18th Voted Out; 6th Jury Member; Day 46	
Mauro Guarnieri; 43, Pergamino	South Team	Gauchos del Caribe	19th Voted Out; 7th Jury Member; Day 49	
Martín "Colli" Collante; 35, Villa Crespo	North Team	Gauchos del Caribe	20th Voted Out; 8th Jury Member; Day 51	
Juan Pablo Busilachi; 32, Hurlingham	North Team	Gauchos del Caribe	21st Voted Out; 9th Jury Member; Day 54	
Agustín Pérez Bardeci; 35, Miami, United States	North Team	Gauchos del Caribe	22nd Voted Out; 10th Jury Member; Day 56	
Martina Musillo; 19, Rosario	South Team	Gauchos del Caribe	23rd Voted Out; 11th Jury Member; Day 58	
Aixa Legarreta; 24, Rosario	South Team	Gauchos del Caribe	Lost Challenge; 12th Jury Member; Day 59	
Baltasar López Barraza; 18, Pilar	South Team	Gauchos del Caribe	Runner Up; Day 60	
Eugenia Propedo; 32, Pueblo Nuevo	South Team	Gauchos del Caribe	Sole Survivor; Day 60	

== Season summary ==
Cycle	Air date	Challenges		
Cycle	Air date	Reward	Tribe Immunity	Individual Immunity
Cycle 1	15-16 July 2024	North Team	North Team	Samanta (Note: Samanta gained immunity before the tribes were formed. Later she became part of the South Team.)
Cycle 2	17-18 July 2024	North Team	South Team	
Cycle 3	21-22 July 2024	North Team	South Team	Inés
Cycle 4	23-24 July 2024	North Team	South Team	Malena
Cycle 5	25-28 July 2024	North Team	North Team	Goldi
Cycle 6	29-31 July 2024	North Team	South Team	Colli
Cycle 7	1-5 August 2024	North Team	North Team	Goldi
Cycle 8	6-7 August 2024	North Team	North Team	Goldi
Cycle 9	8-11 August 2024	Both tribes	South Team	Juan Pablo
Cycle 10	12-13 August 2024	South Team	North Team	Baltasar
Cycle 11	15-19 August 2024	South Team	South Team	Inés
Cycle 12	20-22 August 2024	North Team [Baltasar]	South Team	Agustín P.
Cycle 13	25-27 August 2024	Francisco, Aixa		Iván, Inés
Cycle 14	28-29 August 2024	Goldi [Colli, Mauro, Martina]		Aixa
Cycle 15	1-3 September 2024	Iván [Francisco, Goldi, Mauro] Goldi, Juan Pablo, Francisco		Eugenia
Cycle 16	4-5 September 2024	Baltasar [Francisco, Mauro]		Colli
Cycle 17	8-11 September 2024	Iván [Eugenia]		Aixa
Cycle 18	12-16 September 2024	Colli [Aixa, Malena]		Aixa
Cycle 19	17-25 September 2024	Aixa & Baltasar [Agustín P., Juan Pablo] Eugenia		Eugenia
Cycle 20	25-27 September 2024	Agustín P. [Colli, Juan Pablo]		Aixa
Cycle 21	29 September - 1 October 2024	Aixa [Baltasar]		Eugenia
Cycle 22	2-3 October 2024	Eugenia [Agustin P. & Martina, Aixa & Baltasar]		Martina
Cycle 23	4-11 October 2024	Martina		Eugenia
Cycle 23	4-11 October 2024	Martina		Baltasar

== Voting history ==
	Original tribes													Merged Tribe											
Episode	2	4	6	8	10	13		16	18	20	22	25	28	31	33	36	38	41	44	49	51	53	55	58	60
Tribe	South; Team	North; Team	North; Team	North; Team	South; Team	North; Team		South; Team	South; Team	North; Team	South; Team	North; Team	North; Team	Gauchos del Caribe											
Eliminated	Braian	Maru	Lobo	Gabriel	Malvina	Tie (Note: The vote resulted in a tie. Per the rules, a second vote was held where the castaways involved (Tomás & Inés) in the tie would not vote and the remaining castaways could only vote for those who tied.)	Tomás	Giselle	Samanta	Julieta	Janet	Agustín M. (Note: Agustín M. is sent in secret to the Isle of the Dead, where he continues to compete for the possibility of entering the unification.)	Colli (Note: Colli is sent in secret to the Isle of the Dead, where he continues to compete for the possibility of entering the unification.)	Fiorela	Ines	Goldi	Francisco	Iván	Malena	Mauro	Colli	Juan Pablo	Agustín P.	Martina	Aixa
Votes	9–1–1–1–1	11–1	7–3–1	6–4	8–4	4–4–1	6–1	6–3–2	7–2–1	3–1–1 (Note: Inés played a hidden immunity idol; therefore three votes against her were not counted.)	7–2	2–1–1–1–1–1	4–2	8–5–1	12–1	8–4	7–5	5-3	3-1 (Note: Mauro played a hidden immunity idol on Baltasar; therefore five votes against him were not counted.)	3-2-2	4-2-1	4-2	4-1	1 (Note: Aixa played a hidden immunity idol on Baltasar; therefore three votes against him were not counted.)	Challenge
Voter	Vote																								
Eugenia	Braian				Malvina			Giselle	Samanta		Janet			Fiorela	Ines	Goldi	Francisco	Iván	~~Baltasar~~	Aixa	Colli	Juan Pablo	Agustín P.	~~Baltasar~~	Won
Baltasar	Braian				Malvina			Giselle	Samanta		Martina			Fiorela	Ines	Juan Pablo	Agustín P.	None	Malena	Colli	Juan Pablo	Juan Pablo	Agustín P.	Martina	Immune
Aixa	Braian				Malvina			Mauro	Samanta		Janet			Fiorela	Ines	Goldi	Agustín P.	Malena	Malena	None	Juan Pablo	Juan Pablo	Agustín P.	~~Baltasar~~	Lost
Martina	Braian				Mauro			Janet	Janet		Janet			Fiorela	Ines	Goldi	Francisco	Iván	~~Baltasar~~	Aixa	Colli	Juan Pablo	Agustín P.	~~Baltasar~~	
Agustín P.		Maru	Lobo	Colli		Tomás	Tomás			Julieta		Juan Pablo	Ines	Colli	Ines	Goldi	Francisco	None	~~Baltasar~~	Mauro	Colli	Baltasar	Baltasar		
Juan Pablo		Maru	Lobo	Gabriel		Inés	Inés			Julieta		Agustín P.	Colli	Colli	Ines	Goldi	Francisco_{x2}	Iván	Mauro	Mauro	Colli	Baltasar			
Colli		Maru	Lobo	Gabriel		Tomás	Tomás			~~Inés~~		Agustín M.	Ines	Goldi	Ines	Goldi	Francisco	Iván	~~Baltasar~~	Mauro	Baltasar				
Mauro	Braian				Malvina			Giselle	Samanta		Janet			Fiorela	Ines	Goldi	Agustín P.	Malena	Malena	Colli					
Malena		Maru	Lobo	Gabriel		Inés	Tomás			~~Inés~~		Colli	Colli	Colli	Ines	Goldi	Francisco	Iván	~~Baltasar~~						
Iván	Goldi				Malvina			Giselle	Samanta		Janet			Fiorela	Ines	Juan Pablo	Agustín P.	Malena							
Francisco	Janet				Malvina			Giselle	Samanta		Janet			Fiorela	Ines	Juan Pablo	Agustín P.								
Goldi	Iván				Malvina			Mauro	Mauro		Janet			Fiorela	Ines	Juan Pablo									
Inés		Maru	Gabriel	Colli		Tomás	None			Julieta		Malena	Colli	Colli	Goldi										
Fiorela		Maru	Gabriel	Gabriel		Inés	Tomás			~~Inés~~		Agustín M.	Colli	Colli											
Agustín M.		Maru	Lobo	Gabriel		Tomás	Tomás			Fiorela		Fiorela													
Janet	Braian				Malvina			Giselle	Samanta		Martina														
Julieta		Maru	Gabriel	Colli		Inés	Tomás			Agustín M.															
Samanta	Braian				Mauro			Janet	Janet																
Giselle	Braian				Mauro			Janet																	
Tomás		Maru	Lobo	Gabriel		Juan Pablo	None																		
Malvina	Braian				Mauro																				
Gabriel		Maru	Lobo	Colli																					
Lobo		Maru	Colli																						
Maru		Gabriel																							
Braian	Giselle																								

Jury vote
Episode	61	
Day	60	
Finalist	Baltasar	Eugenia
Votes	7-5	
Juror	Vote	
Aixa	Baltasar	
Martina		Eugenia
Agustín P.		Eugenia
Juan Pablo		Eugenia
Colli		Eugenia
Mauro	Baltasar	
Malena		Eugenia
Iván	Baltasar	
Francisco	Baltasar	
Goldi		Eugenia
Inés		Eugenia
Fiorela	Baltasar	

Notes

Colour key:

Individual immunity

== Elimination table ==
Survivor	Tribal Council													Duel	Tribal Council										
Survivor	1	2	3	4	5	6		7	8	9	10	11	12	1	13	14	15	16	17	18	19	20	21	22	23
Aixa	SAFE	WIN	WIN	WIN	SAFE	WIN		SAFE	SAFE	WIN	SAFE	WIN	WIN	—	SAFE	INM	SAFE	SAFE	INM	INM	RISK	INM	SAFE	SAFE	SAFE
Baltasar	SAFE	WIN	WIN	WIN	SAFE	WIN		SAFE	SAFE	WIN	INM	WIN	WIN	—	SAFE	SAFE	SAFE	SAFE	SAFE	IDOL	SAFE	RISK	RISK	RISK	IDOL
Eugenia	SAFE	WIN	WIN	WIN	SAFE	WIN		SAFE	SAFE	WIN	SAFE	WIN	WIN	—	SAFE	SAFE	INM	SAFE	SAFE	SAFE	INM	SAFE	INM	SAFE	INM
Martina	SAFE	WIN	WIN	WIN	SAFE	WIN		SAFE	SAFE	WIN	RISK	WIN	WIN	—	SAFE	SAFE	SAFE	SAFE	SAFE	SAFE	SAFE	SAFE	SAFE	INM	OUT
Agustín P.	WIN	SAFE	SAFE	SAFE	WIN	SAFE	—	WIN	WIN	SAFE	WIN	RISK	INM	—	SAFE	SAFE	SAFE	RISK	SAFE	SAFE	SAFE	INM	SAFE	OUT	
Juan Pablo	WIN	SAFE	SAFE	SAFE	WIN	RISK	—	WIN	WIN	INM	WIN	RISK	SAFE	—	SAFE	SAFE	RISK	SAFE	SAFE	SAFE	SAFE	RISK	OUT		
Colli	WIN	SAFE	RISK	RISK	WIN	INM	—	WIN	WIN	SAFE	WIN	RISK	OUT	WIN	RISK	SAFE	SAFE	SAFE	SAFE	SAFE	RISK	OUT			
Mauro	SAFE	WIN	WIN	WIN	RISK	WIN		RISK	RISK	WIN	SAFE	WIN	WIN	—	SAFE	SAFE	SAFE	SAFE	IDOL	RISK	OUT				
Malena	WIN	SAFE	SAFE	INM	WIN	SAFE	—	WIN	WIN	SAFE	WIN	RISK	SAFE	—	SAFE	SAFE	SAFE	SAFE	RISK	OUT					
Ivan	RISK	WIN	WIN	WIN	SAFE	WIN		SAFE	SAFE	WIN	SAFE	WIN	WIN	—	INM	SAFE	SAFE	SAFE	OUT						
Francisco	SAFE	WIN	WIN	WIN	SAFE	WIN		SAFE	SAFE	WIN	SAFE	WIN	WIN	—	SAFE	SAFE	SAFE	OUT							
Goldi	RISK	WIN	WIN	WIN	INM	WIN		INM	INM	WIN	SAFE	WIN	WIN	—	RISK	RISK	OUT								
Ines	WIN	SAFE	INM	SAFE	WIN	RISK	RISK	WIN	WIN	IDOL	WIN	INM	RISK	—	INM	OUT									
Fiorela	WIN	SAFE	SAFE	SAFE	WIN	SAFE	—	WIN	WIN	RISK	WIN	RISK	IDOL	—	OUT										
Agustín M.	WIN	SAFE	SAFE	SAFE	WIN	SAFE	—	WIN	WIN	RISK	WIN	OUT		LOSE											
Janet	RISK	WIN	WIN	WIN	SAFE	WIN		RISK	RISK	WIN	OUT														
Julieta	WIN	SAFE	SAFE	SAFE	WIN	SAFE	—	WIN	WIN	OUT															
Samanta	INM	WIN	WIN	WIN	SAFE	WIN		SAFE	OUT																
Giselle	RISK	WIN	WIN	WIN	SAFE	WIN		OUT																	
Tomas	WIN	SAFE	SAFE	SAFE	WIN	RISK	OUT																		
Malvina	SAFE	WIN	WIN	WIN	OUT																				
Gabriel	WIN	RISK	RISK	OUT																					
Lobo	WIN	SAFE	OUT																						
Maru	WIN	OUT																							
Braian	OUT																								

WIN The survivor wins with his tribe in a group immunity challenge.
INM The survivor wins the individual immunity challenge.
SAFE The survivor receives no votes at tribal council.
RISK The survivor receives votes at tribal council.
OUT The survivor receives the majority of votes at the tribal council and is eliminated.
IDOL The survivor uses the Secret Immunity Idol at the tribal council and overturns the votes against him.
OUT The survivor receives the majority of votes at the tribal council, is eliminated but he is secretly sent to the Island of Death.
LOSE The survivor is eliminated for losing the challenge.
