= Hontoria del Pinar =

- Municipality and town
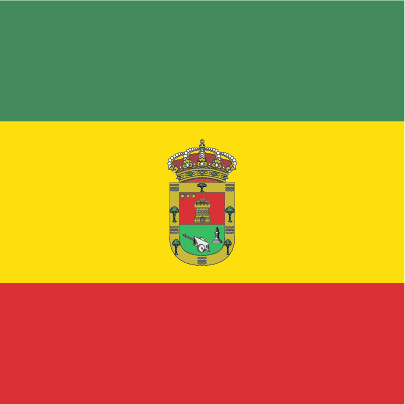
- Flag Coat of arms

- Location within Castile and León Location within Spain
- Coordinates: 41°51′N 3°10′W
- Country: Spain
- Autonomous community: Castile and León
- Province: Burgos
- Comarca: Sierra de la Demanda

Area
  - Total: 81 km^{2} (31 sq mi)
- Elevation: 773 m (2,536 ft)

Population (2025-01-01)
  - Total: 613
  - Density: 7.6/km^{2} (20/sq mi)
- Time zone: UTC+1 (CET)
  - Summer (DST): UTC+2 (CEST)
- Postal code: 09660
- Website: www.hontoriadelpinar.es

Hontoria del Pinar is a municipality located in the province of Burgos, Castile and León, Spain. According to the 2004 census (INE), the municipality has a population of 787 inhabitants.

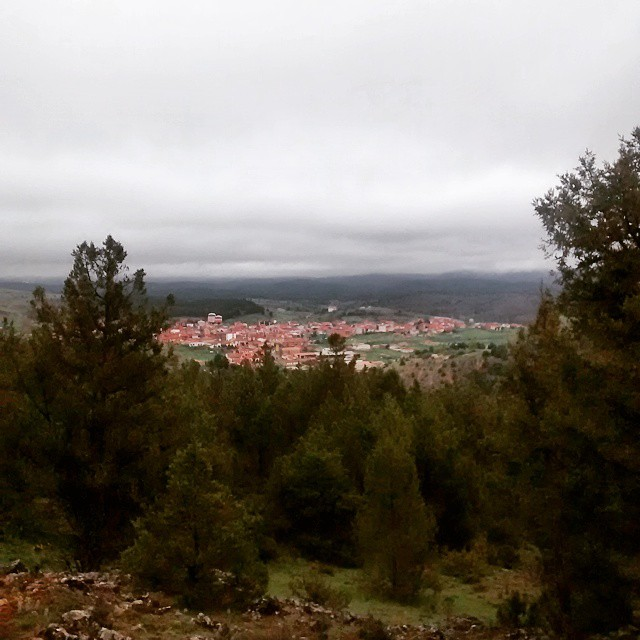
View of Hontoria del Pinar, Burgos, Spain

== See also ==
- Aldea del Pinar
- Navas del Pinar
