= Navas del Pinar =

Coordinates: 41.8543°N 3.2267°W

Navas del Pinar is a village, smaller local authority or parish in the municipality of Hontoria del Pinar, situated southeast of the province of Burgos, and belongs to the Community of Castilla y León (Spain). It is situated 82 km from the capital Burgos. Cattle grazing is the local industry.
