= Torre – Pedro =

Village in Albacete Province, Spain

Coordinates: 38°27′N 2°17′W

Torre – Pedro is a village in the municipality of Molinicos, province of Albacete, in the autonomous community of Castile-La Mancha, Spain.
