= El Pardal =

Village in Albacete, Spain

Coordinates: 38°29′N 2°16′W

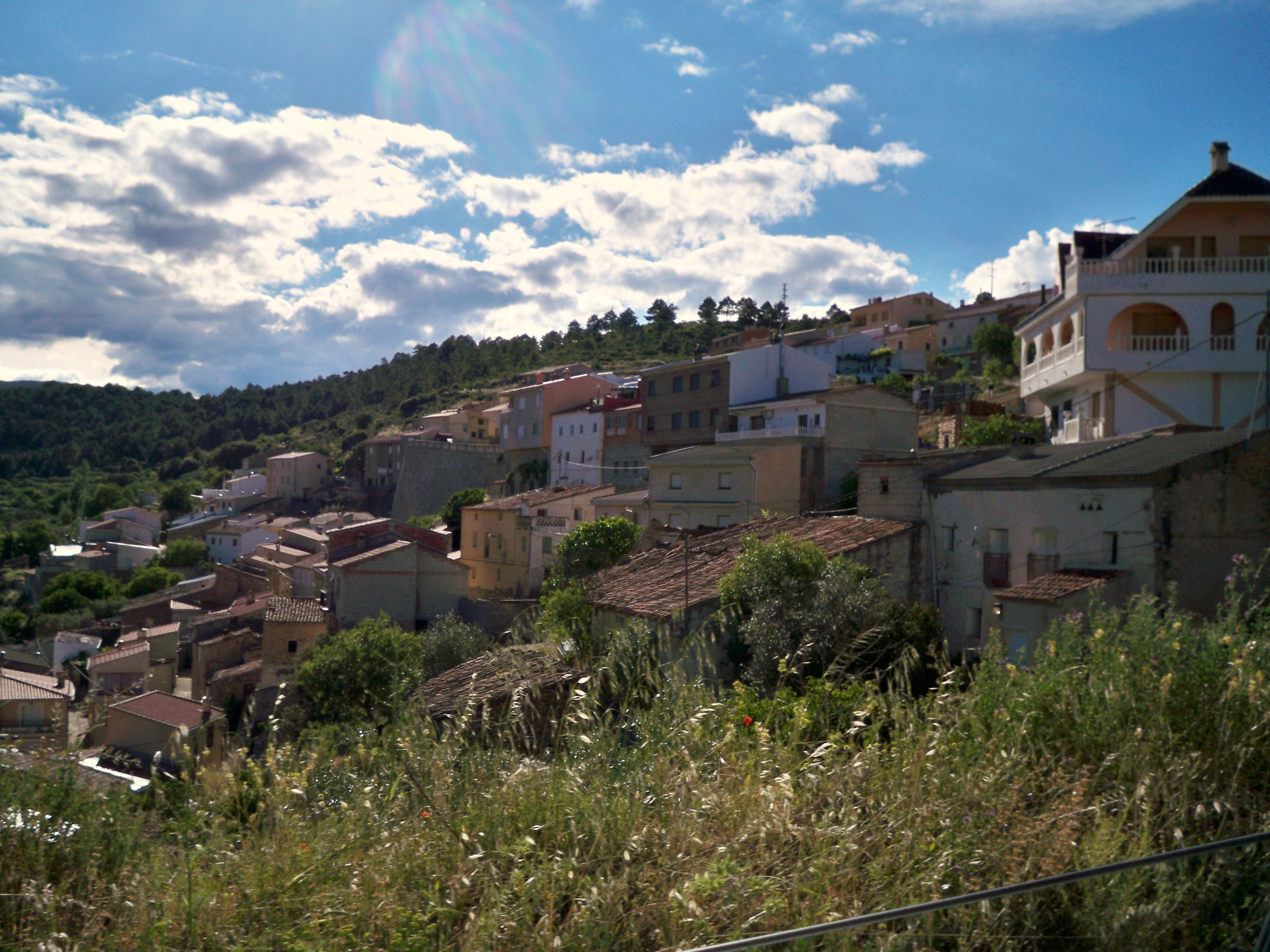
Localidad de El Pardal (Molinicos)

El Pardal is a village in the municipality of Molinicos, province of Albacete, in the autonomous community of Castile-La Mancha, Spain.
