= Vegallera =

Village in Albacete, Castile-La Mancha, Spain

Coordinates: 38°33′N 2°20′W

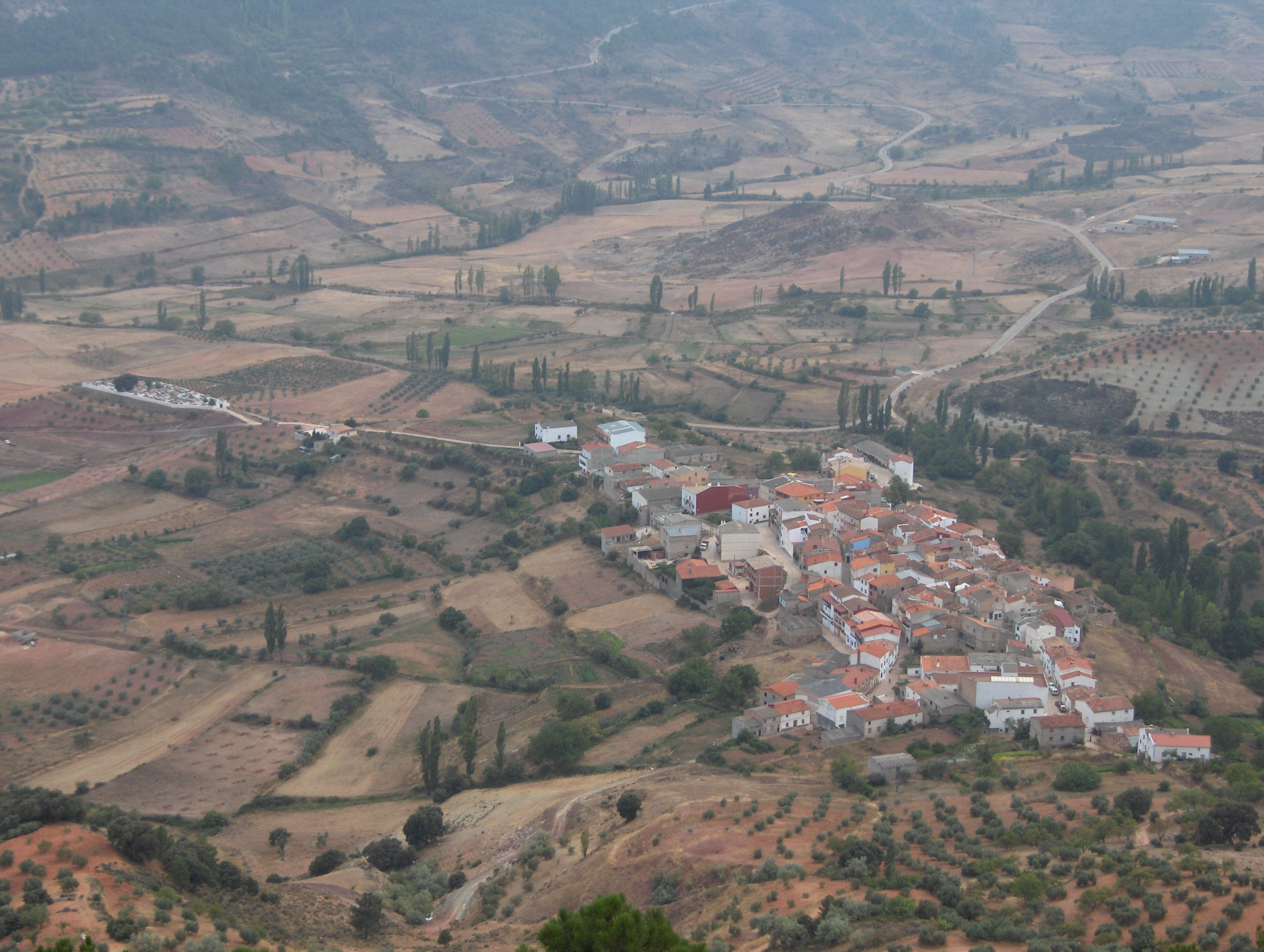
Vegallera

Vegallera is a village in the municipality of Molinicos, province of Albacete, in the autonomous community of Castile-La Mancha, Spain.
