= Aldea de Fuente Carrasca =

- Village
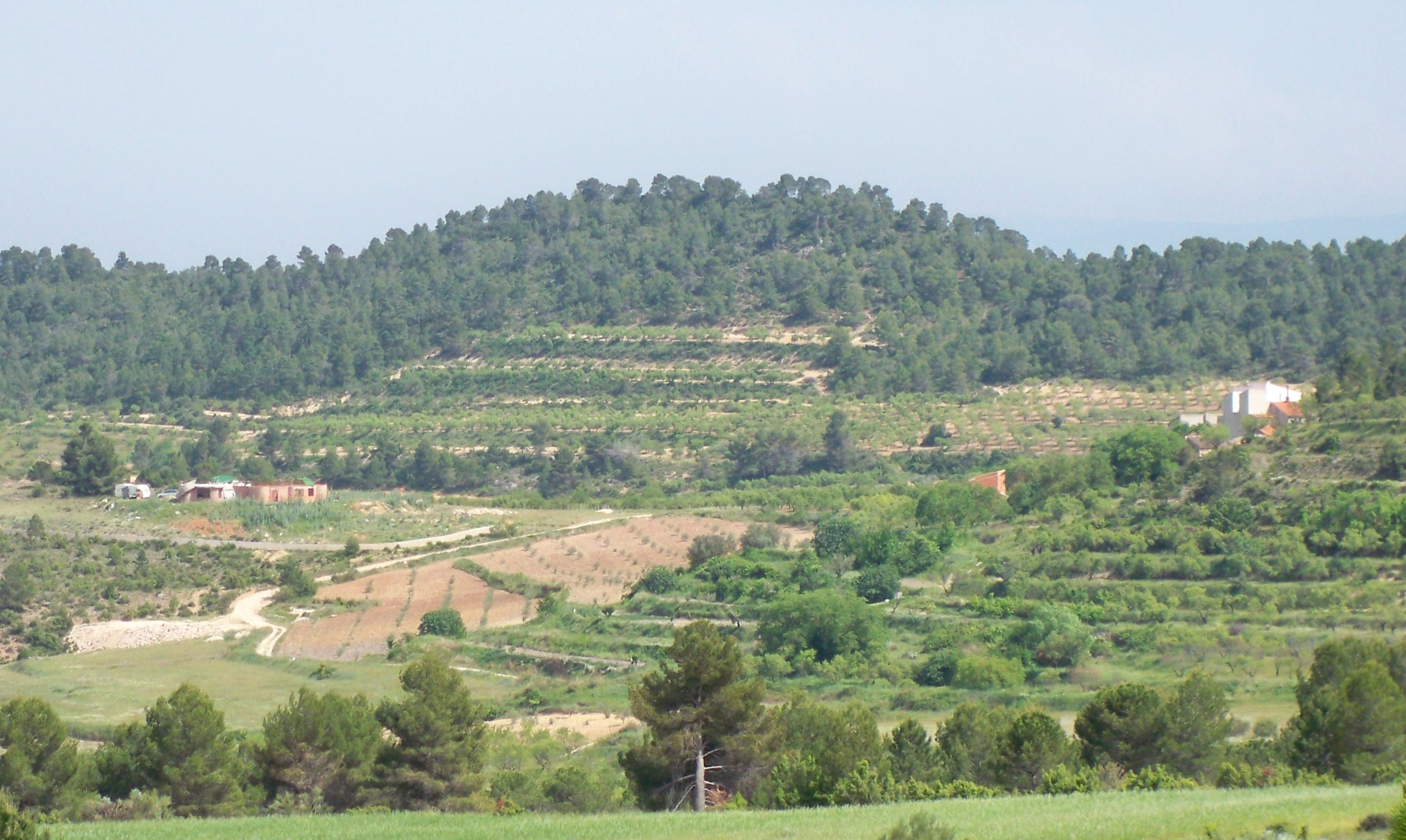
- Town of Fuente Carrasca

- Location within Spain
- Coordinates: 38°30′N 2°12′W
- Country: Spain
- Autonomous community: Castile-La Mancha
- Province: Albacete
- Municipality: Molinicos

Fuente Carrasca is a village in the municipality of Molinicos, Albacete, Spain, within the Sierra del Segura region, and the Autonomous Community of Castilla-La Mancha. It is located 1,060 meters above sea level and 6 km from the municipal center via a local road that starts from the provincial highway AB‑510.

The village has a past linked to livestock and agriculture, proof of this is the large fields of almond trees that are located at its feet. Fuente Carrasca is located in an area of steep slopes that tilt in its western area, and decrease from east to west. Pascual Madoz cites it in his "Geographical-statistical-historical dictionary of Spain and its overseas possessions" in 1849.

Pascual Madoz already published data on Fuente Carrasca in 1849: "Cortijada with 4 houses in the province of Albacete, judicial district of Yeste and jurisdictional term of Aina."The population sits to the east of a very pronounced hill, just at the foot of its slope, where the entrance road serves to distribute the buildings that give it a clear linear shape as a result. One of the streets with south-north direction, acts as the main axis dividing the houses in two. To the east are most of the buildings and to the west some new ones."

Fuente Carrasca has in its vicinity one of the largest mounts in the entire municipality, and of which there is already news of its use in the year 1863, when a commission was created for its demarcation.

The village has a small church dedicated to the Assumption of the Virgin, the Patron Saint of Fuente Carrasca.

In 1930, the creation of an access road to the village was requested, coming from the village of Pinilla to avoid the traditional isolationism of its citizens, and another to communicate it from Los Alejos, with the neighboring village of Ayna.
