= Aldea San Antonio =

- Village
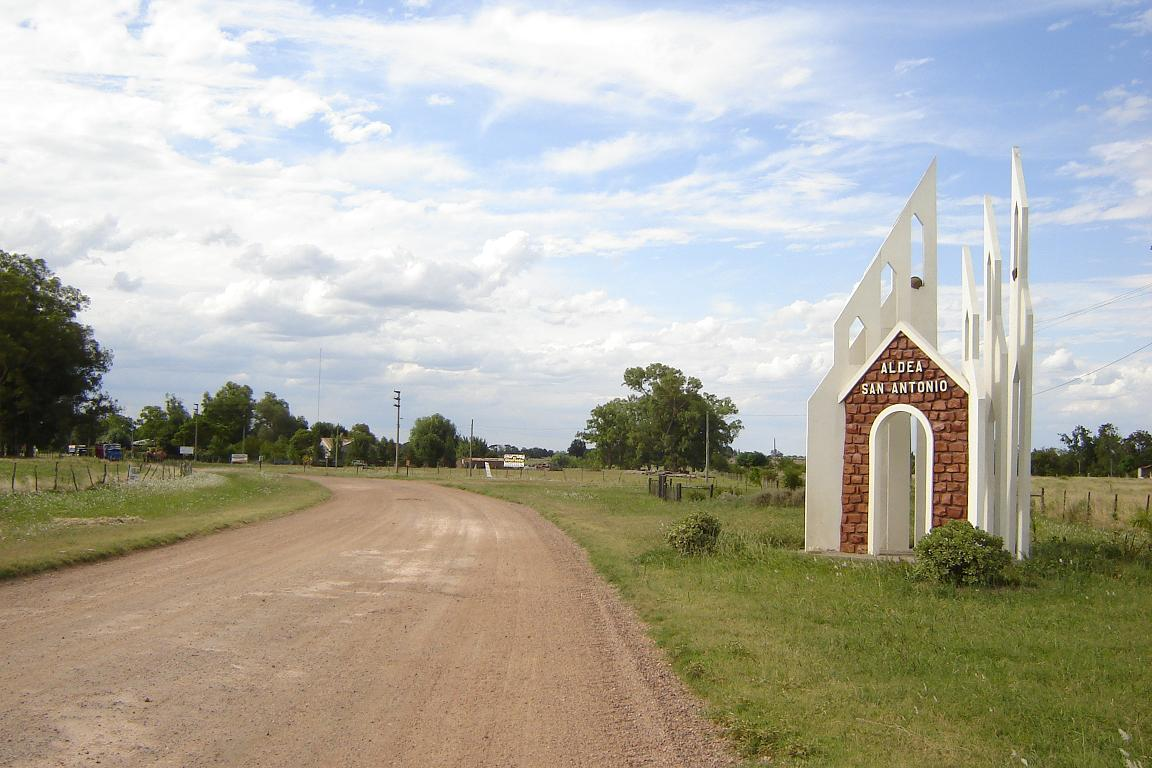
- Aldea San Antonio entrance

- Location of Aldea San Antonio in Argentina
- Coordinates: 32°37′S 58°42′W
- Country: Argentina
- Province: Entre Ríos
- Department: Gualeguaychú

Government
  - Mayor: Javier Horacio Schultheis
- Elevation: 39 m (128 ft)

Population (2010)
  - Total: 1,483
- Time zone: UTC−3 (ART)
- Dialing code: +54 3446
- Website: www.munialdea.gov.ar

Aldea San Antonio is a municipality in the department of Gualeguaychú, in Entre Ríos Province, Argentina. It is located 55 km from the city of Gualeguaychú and about 255 km from the provincial capital, Paraná. According to the 2010 census, the village had 1,483 inhabitants. The village was founded on 27 February 1889 by immigrant Volga Germans from the village of Splavnukha (Huck) in Saratov Oblast, Russia. The mainstay of its economy is agriculture.

== History ==
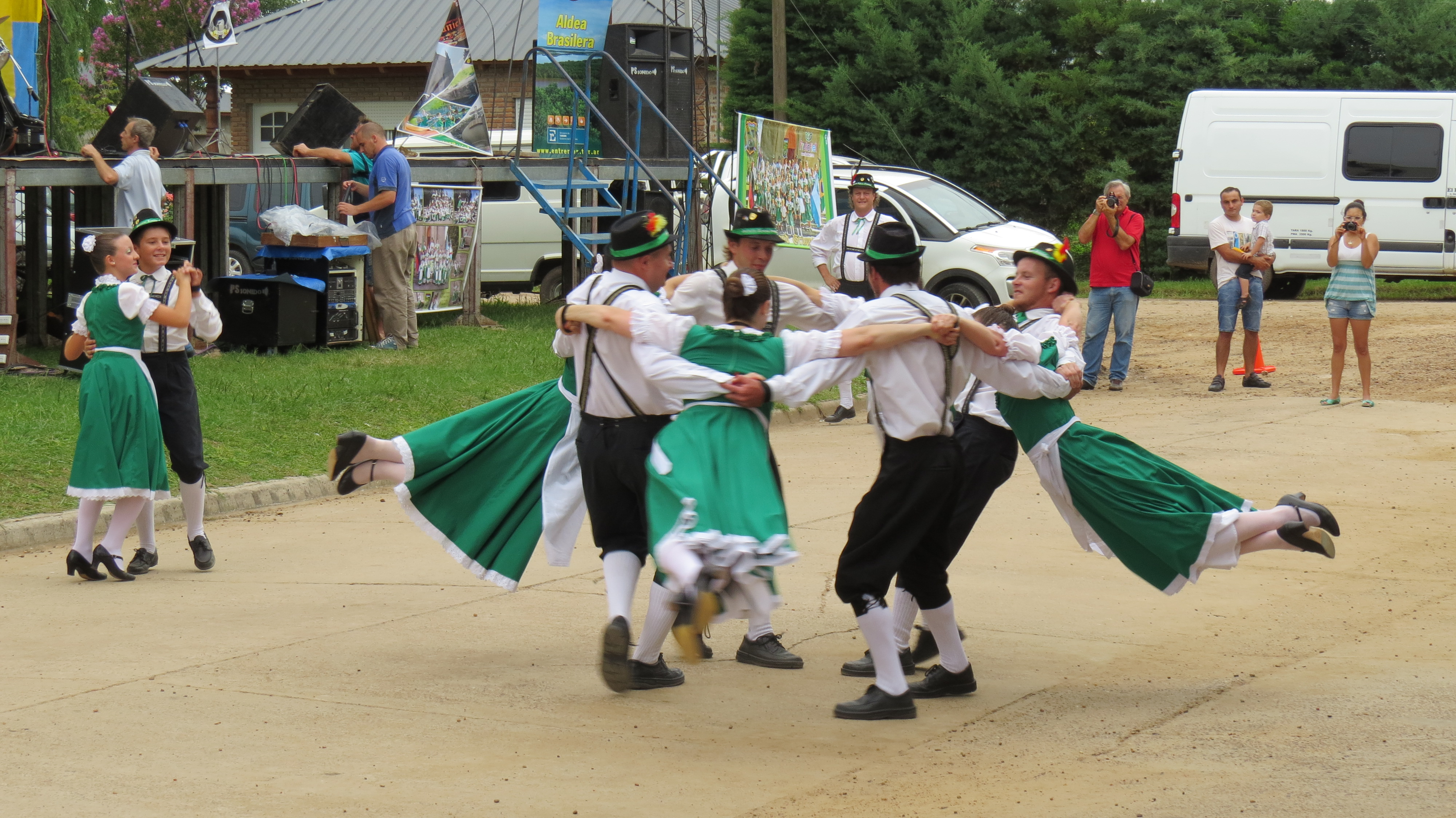
Typical German dance ballet from Aldea San Antonio.

The land the village is located belonged to Jacobo Spangenberg, who sold it in 1889 to a contingent of Volga German settlers who founded the colony. In 1888, 19 families in the Puerto de Diamante were from the Volga river region. The majority of them came from Huck village, Sarátov Oblast in Russia. After a provisional stay in Aldea Protestante, they went to the area where they founded three villages: San Juan, San Antonio, and Santa Celia. Thirty families settled in San Juan, and seventeen in San Antonio. On 24 February 1889, the village of San Antonio was founded. The community gradually grew to 507 inhabitants in 1991 and 791 in 2001.

The governing board of the rural population center of Aldea San Antonio already existed on 11 August 1978, and new boundaries to the urban area were set by decree 809/1985 MGJE of 19 March 1985. The jurisdictional boundaries of the governing board were set by decree 6353/1986 MGJE of 22 December 1986.

The second category municipality of Aldea San Antonio was approved by Law No. 7942 passed on 7 July 1987 and created by Decree No. 3927/1987 MGJE on 22 July 1987. By the same decree, Carlos Michel was appointed as commissioner for the building of the municipality. In September 1987, the first development board was elected.

On 10 December 2011, the two categories of municipalities ceased to exist in Entre Ríos, due to the expiry of the development boards of the second category municipalities, applying the Municipal Regime Law No. 10 027 (sanctioned and enacted on 10 May 2011). Therefore, the municipalities were no longer categorized. Aldea San Antonio now has an executive department headed by a municipal president elected by the people and a deliberative council of 7 elected members.

== Religion ==
It has three evangelical churches (ECRP, IEC, IELA), an Adventist church, a Catholic chapel, and associations of Volga German descendants.

The largest church in the village is the Evangelical Protestant, with the Evangelical Church of the River Plate being the mother church of all the other evangelical churches and the one with the largest number of parishioners. It is followed by the Evangelical Congregational Church and the Evangelical Lutheran Church of Argentina. Some inhabitants belong to the Seventh-Day Adventist Church.

A Catholic chapel was built for later immigrants and converts. La Aldea is characterized by being the mother colony of the Evangelicals in the area, especially towards Urdinarriain, Basavilbaso, and Gualeguaychú. For most of the inhabitants, church attendance continues to be an essential part of their idiosyncrasy.

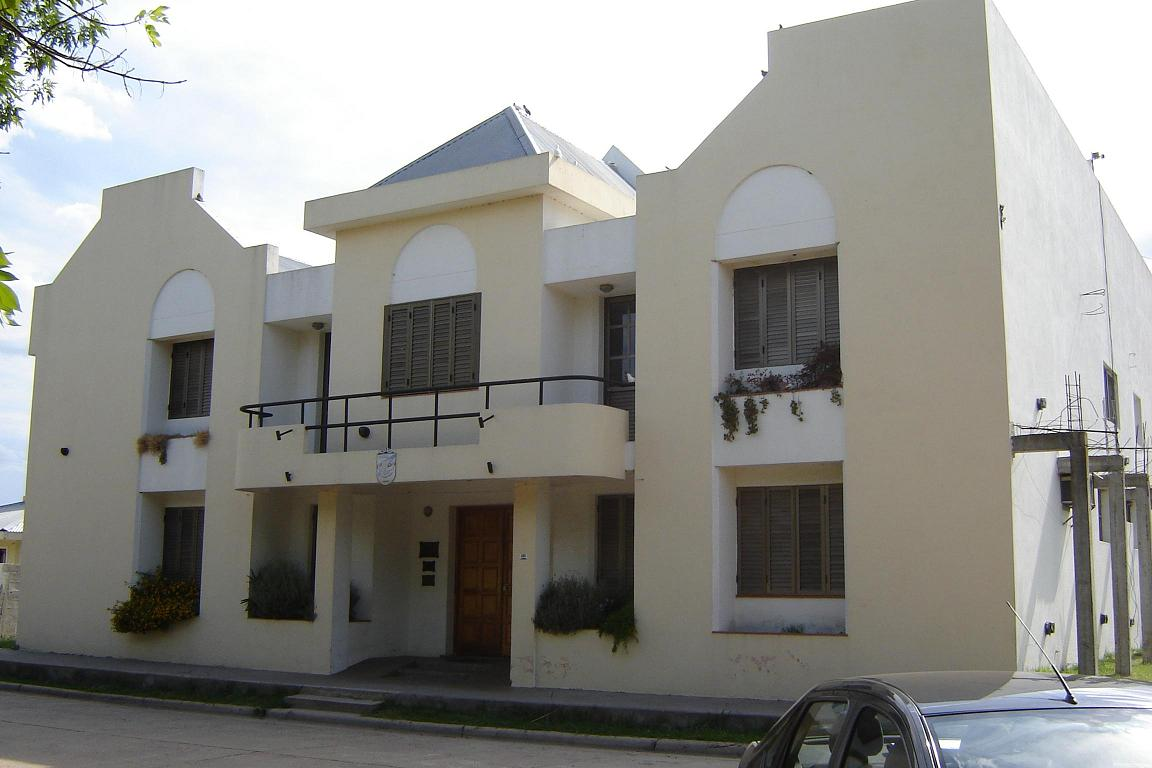
Aldea San Antonio Town Hall.

== Culture ==
Many residents are descendants of the German Volga immigrants, and many German traditions have been preserved.

Since 1996, the Festival of the German Immigrant has been celebrated, in which the different cultural expressions of the village are showcased. Folklore groups are also invited to share in the celebration. The festival is celebrated in February, along with the anniversary of the creation of the village.
