= Fuente-Higuera =

Coordinates: 38°29′N 2°14′W

Fuente-Higuera is a village in the municipality of Molinicos, province of Albacete, in the autonomous community of Castile–La Mancha, Spain.
