= Molinicos =

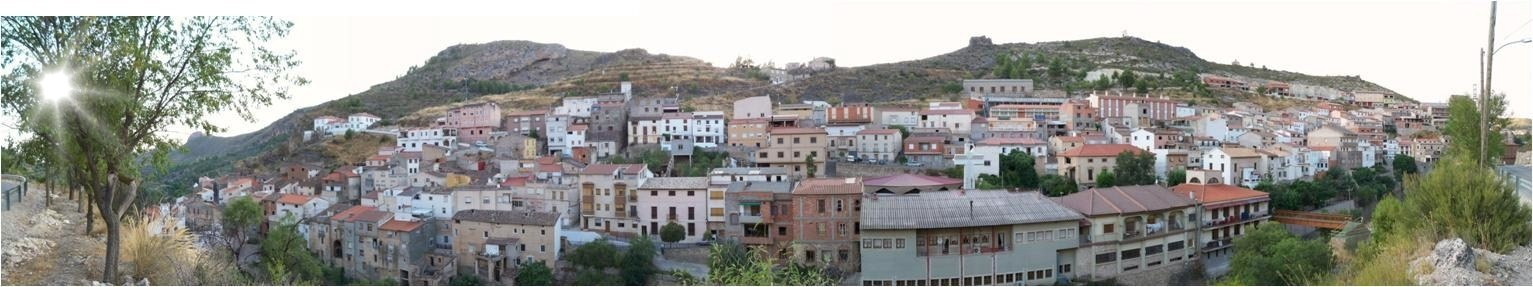

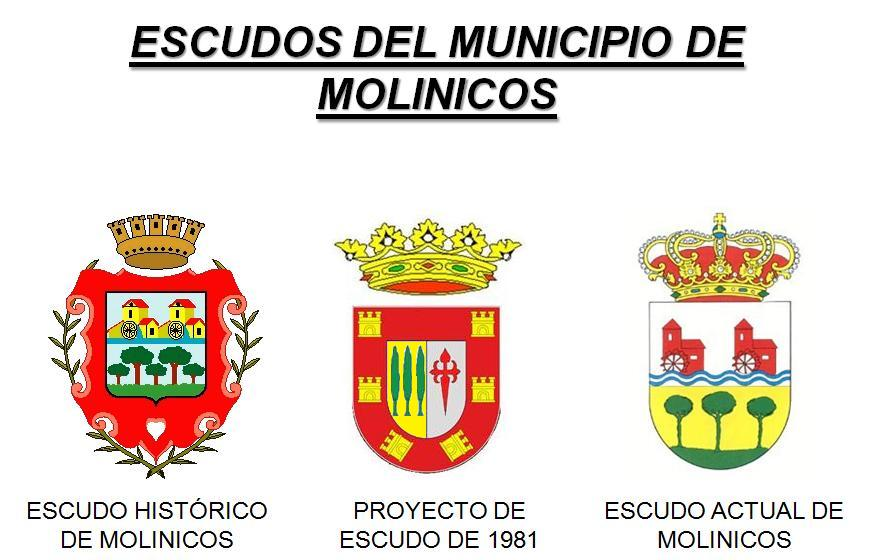
- Coat of arms
- Nickname: "Corazón de la Sierra"
- Location in Spain
- Coordinates: 38°27′56.36″N 2°14′23.80″W
- Country: Spain
- Province: Albacete

Government
  - Mayor: José González Osuna (PSOE)

Area
  - Total: 144 km^{2} (56 sq mi)

Population (2025-01-01)
  - Total: 754
  - Density: 5.24/km^{2} (13.6/sq mi)
- Time zone: UTC+1 (CET)
  - Summer (DST): UTC+2 (CEST)
- Website: www.molinicos.es

Molinicos is a municipality in Albacete, Castile-La Mancha, Spain.

Molinicos is 91 km from the capital of the province. In 2005, it had 1,232 inhabitants, according to the INE, who are distributed through the city center and its sixteen neighborhoods. Besides the urban hull, the other neighborhoods include The Alpera, The Souls, Morote's Glen, Provencio's Glen, The Hills, Source(Fountain)-holly-oak, Source(Fountain)-fig tree, The Pits, Inns, The Pardal, Pinilla, Quejigal, Torre-Pedro and Vegallera as well as a great number of hamlets, including El Morcillar, The Sisters, The Highlander and The Strait. The city center has a size of 144 km^{2}. The urban center is distributed in two zones, the old town and the modern Molinicos.

The low part of the village is more ancient and its architecture is reminiscent of earlier eras, with whitewashed fronts, wood doors, forge of the windows and tiles. The Major Plaza is a landmark, where many important buildings are located. Among them is the current "Museum of the Nízcalo", a mycological museum of Spain and the former Town hall. At the Plaza of the Church there is one of two churches in the city center located, which is the Church of San Jose. It dates from the eighteenth century. Also situated around the Major Plaza are the street mills, from which this locality derives its name.

The modern part of Molinicos breaks with the aesthetics of the ancient part, as modern materials were used for construction and buildings are often higher than four stories. This zone begins in the Plaza of Our Lady of Carmen, which is popularly known as "The Widening" as the streets are parallel. The Plaza of Our Lady of Carmen is another landmark, as is the church of the same name and the House of the Culture.

Towards Albacete, for the Avenue of the above-mentioned name, we find the Regional Cooperative society and the Firemen's Regional Park.

Outside the town, there are many attractions, including a Roman aqueduct, placing when the street finishing Mills, The Rock Periwig, an impressive mountain of stone. Also famous is a cave called "Royoteros", from which the river emerges from a cluster of stalagmites. Near the municipality, there is a nature reserve, Parque Natural de los Calares del Río Mundo y de la Sima.

The main festival in Molinicos takes place in the first week of September, beginning on August 30 and ending on September 4. Bullfights are always well attended.

== Villages at Molinicos municipality ==
- Molinicos
- Los Alejos
- La Alfera
- Las Ánimas
- Cañada de Morote
- Cañada del Provencio
- Los Collados
- Fuente Carrasca
- Fuente - Higuera
- Las Hoyas
- Los Chóvales
- Mesones
- El Pardal
- Pinilla
- El Quejigal
- Torre - Pedro
- Vegallera
