= La Alfera =

Coordinates: 38°31′N 2°17′W

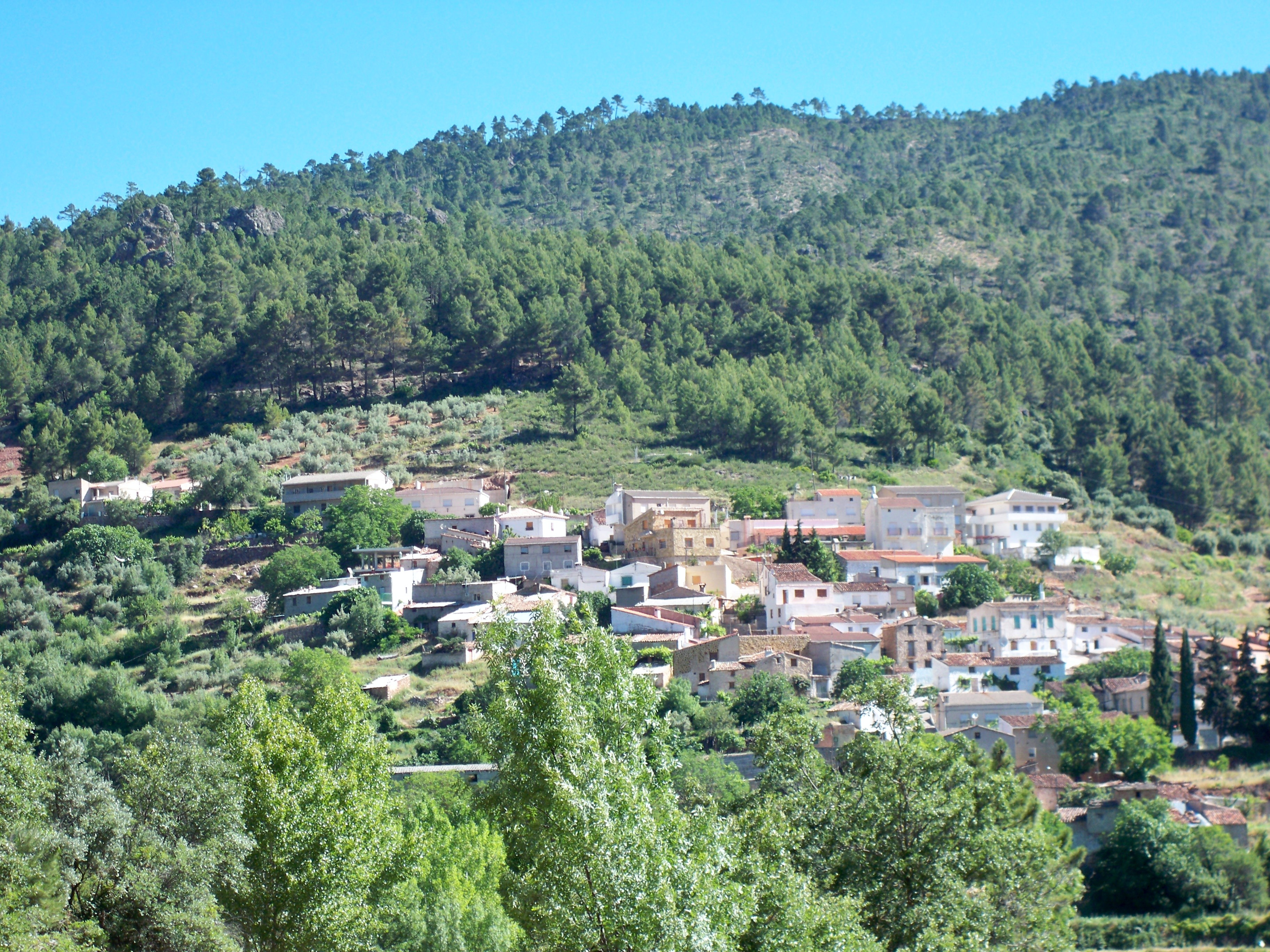
La Alfera

La Alfera is a village in the municipality of Molinicos, province of Albacete, in the autonomous community of Castile-La Mancha, Spain.
