= Ramírez Island, Antarctica =

Island in Antarctica

Ramírez Island
- Location within Antarctica

Geography
- Location: Antarctica
- Coordinates: 69°09′S 68°28′W

Administration
- Administered under the Antarctic Treaty System

Demographics
- Population: Uninhabited

Ramírez Island is the northernmost of the three Bugge Islands), lying off Wordie Ice Shelf in the south part of Marguerite Bay, Fallières Coast, Antarctica. The island was named "Isla Eleuterio Ramirez" by the Chilean Antarctic Expedition, 1947, possibly after a member of the expedition. A concise form of the original name has been approved.

== See also ==
- List of Antarctic and sub-Antarctic islands
