= Las Ánimas, Spain =

Coordinates: 38°30′N 2°17′W

Las Ánimas is a village in the municipality of Molinicos, province of Albacete, in the autonomous community of Castile-La Mancha, Spain.
