= Cañada de Morote =

Coordinates: 38°29′N 2°16′W

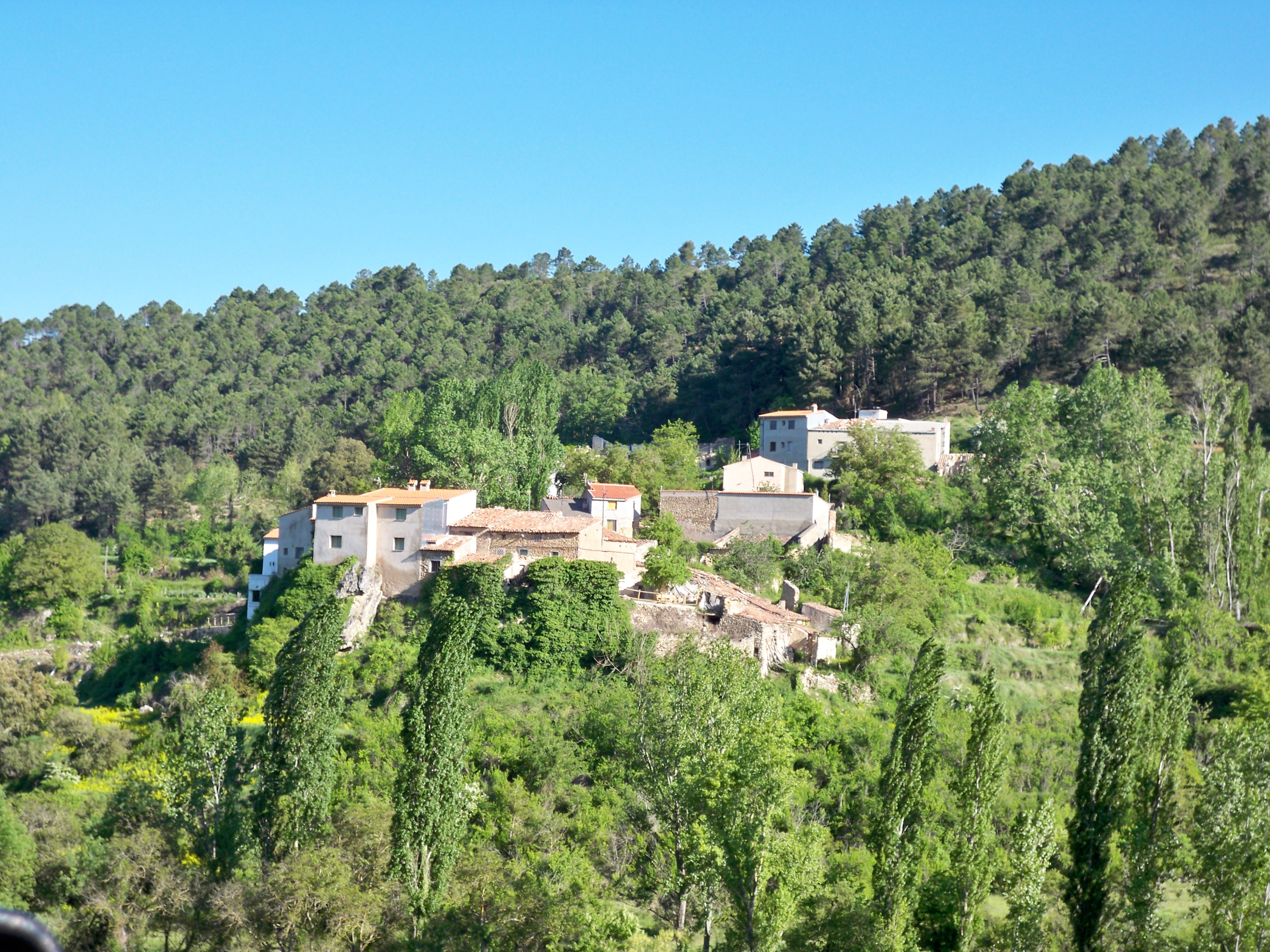
Vista panorámica de Cañada de Morote (Molinicos - Albacete)

Cañada de Morote is a village in the municipality of Molinicos, province of Albacete, in the autonomous community of Castile-La Mancha, Spain.
