= Cañada del Provencio =

Coordinates: 38°31′N 2°20′W

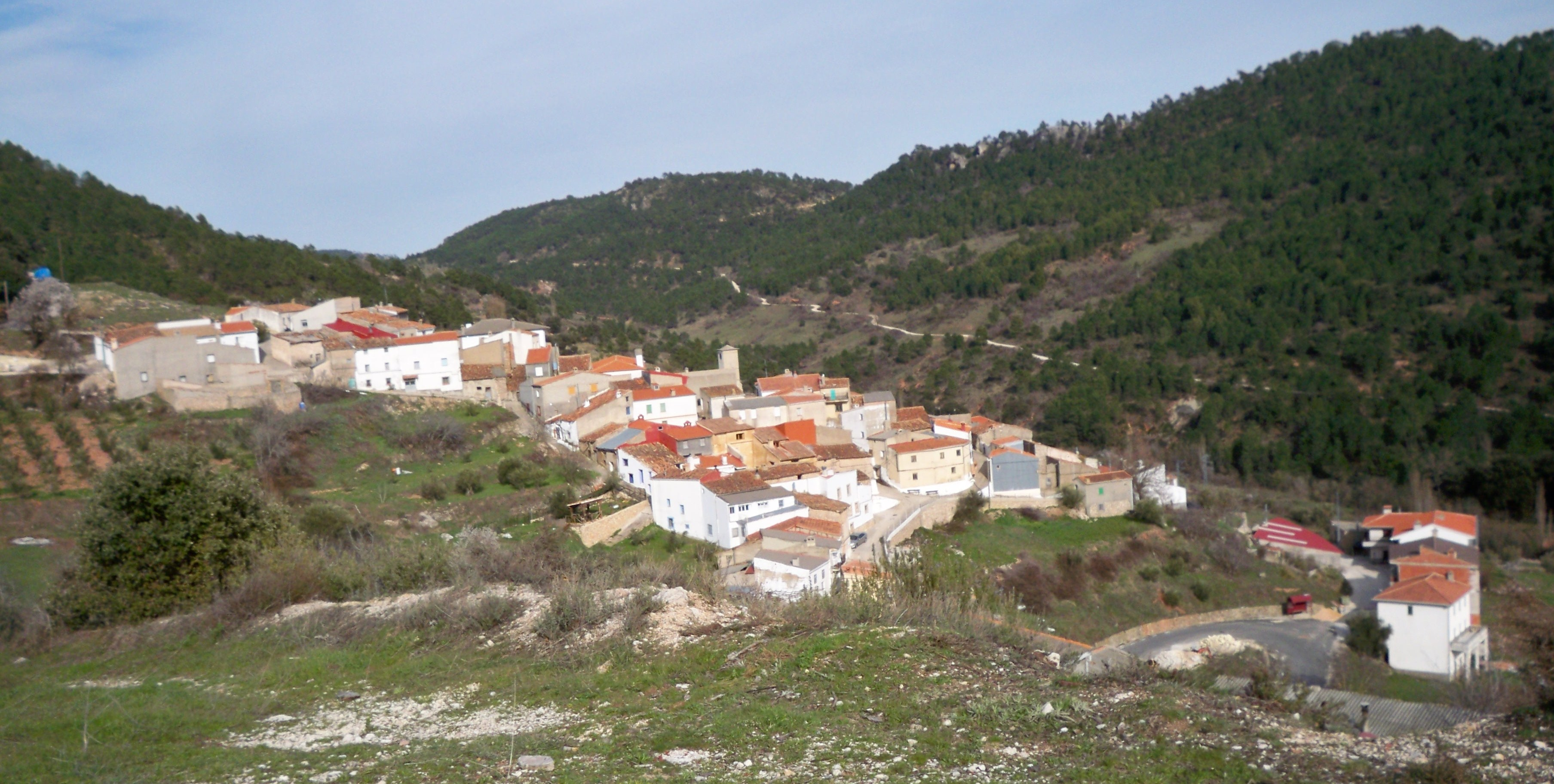
Vista de Cañada del Provencio

Cañada del Provencio is a village in the municipality of Molinicos, province of Albacete, in the autonomous community of Castile-La Mancha, Spain.
