= Landrum Island =

Island in Graham Land, Antarctica

- Location within Antarctica

Geography
- Location: Antarctica
- Coordinates: 69°14′S 68°20′W

Administration
- Administered under the Antarctic Treaty System

Demographics
- Population: Uninhabited

Landrum Island is the southernmost of the three Bugge Islands in the south part of Marguerite Bay, Fallières Coast, Antarctica. The island was called "Isla Latorre" by the Chilean Antarctic Expedition, 1947, and was later named by the Advisory Committee on Antarctic Names for biologist Betty J. Landrum of the Smithsonian Oceanographic Sorting Center, 1965–89, serving as Director, 1973–78.
