= Los Collados =

Village in Albacete, Spain

Coordinates: 38°27′N 2°19′W

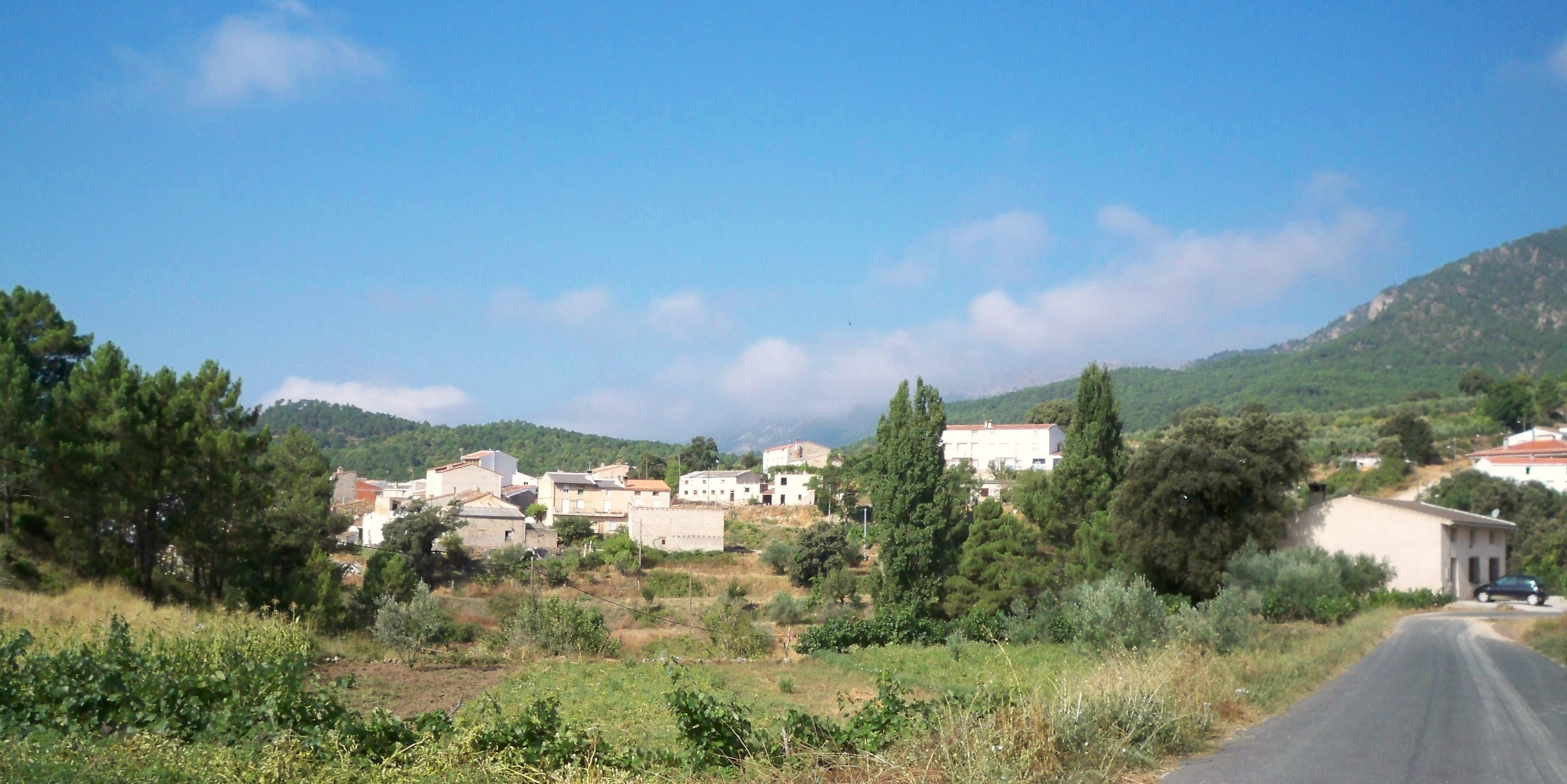
Los Collados

Los Collados is a village in the municipality of Molinicos, province of Albacete, in the autonomous community of Castile-La Mancha, Spain.
