= Los Chóvales =

Human settlement in Albacete Province, Castile-La Mancha, Spain

Coordinates: 38°32′N 2°18′W

- Village
- Location within Spain
- Country: Spain
- Autonomous community: Castile-La Mancha
- Province: Albacete
- Municipality: Molinicos
- Time zone: UTC+1 (CET)
  - Summer (DST): UTC+2 (CEST)

Los Chóvales is a village in the municipality of Molinicos, province of Albacete, in the autonomous community of Castile-La Mancha, Spain.
