= Aldea Island =

Island in Graham Land, Antarctica

- Location within Antarctica

Geography
- Location: Antarctica
- Coordinates: 69°13′S 68°30′W
- Archipelago: Bugge Islands

Administration
- Administered under the Antarctic Treaty System

Demographics
- Population: Uninhabited

Aldea Island is the central of the three Bugge Islands, off Wordie Ice Shelf, Fallières Coast, Antarctic Peninsula. The island was named Isla Aldea by the Chilean Antarctic Expedition, 1947, probably after Sargento Juan de Dios Aldea, of the Chilean Navy, one of the heroes of the naval battle of Iquique, May 21, 1879.

== See also ==
- Composite Antarctic Gazetteer
- List of Antarctic islands south of 60° S
- SCAR
- Territorial claims in Antarctica
