= Aldea de Las Hoyas =

Coordinates: 38°28′N 2°16′W

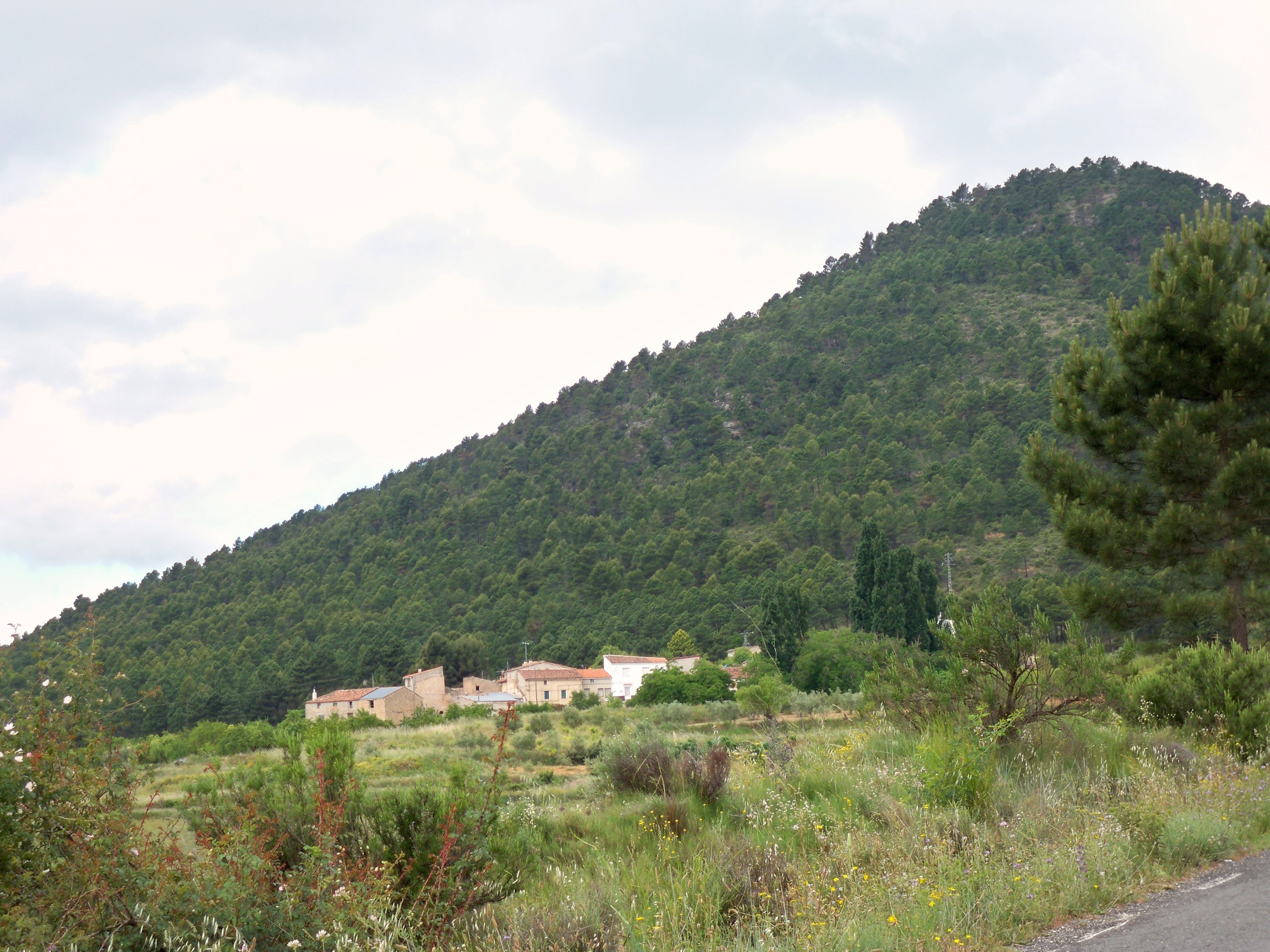
Vista de Las Hoyas

Aldea de Las Hoyas is a village in the municipality of Molinicos, province of Albacete, in the autonomous community of Castile-La Mancha, Spain.
