= Expedición Robinson 2001 =

- Season 2
- Presented by: Julian Weich
- No. of days: 39
- No. of castaways: 16
- Winner: María Victoria "Vick" Fernández
- Runner-up: Carla Levy
- Location: Belize
- No. of episodes: 13

Release
- Original network: Canal 13
- Original release: September 19 – December 19, 2001

Season chronology
- ← Previous; 2000 Next → Survivor, Expedición Robinson

Expedición Robinson 2001 is the second season of the Argentine version of the Swedish show Expedition Robinson and was aired in 2001. Like the previous season, this season took place on an island in Belize.

== Season summary ==
During the pre-merge portion of the competition the North team proved to be weaker than their South team counterparts, only winning two of the six immunity challenges and losing four in a row. Shortly after the merge the former South team members turned on each other, voting out two of their own. When the black vote came into the game a bitter Carla Cavalloni took revenge on her tribe by joining the former North team members in voting out her former tribe member Pablo González. When it came time for the final four, the remaining contestants competed in two challenges to determine who would be the final two. Ultimately, María Victoria "Vick" Fernández who defied the odds and won this season over Carla Levy by a jury vote of 5-2.

== Contestants ==
There were sixteen contestants overall, divided into two tribes, the North Team and the South Team. After six contestants were eliminated, the tribes were combined, or merged, to form one tribe, Robinson. Seven contestants made up the jury, who ultimately decided between the final two contestants who would win the game.

List of Expedición Robinson 2001 contestants
Contestant	Original Tribe	Switched tribe	Merged Tribe	Finish
Guillermo Somogyi; 29, Buenos Aires	South Team			1st Voted Out; Day 3
Josefina Pouso; 23, Adrogué	North Team			2nd Voted Out; Day 6
Fernando "Doc" Cousillas; 45, Buenos Aires	North Team			3rd Voted Out; Day 9
Eduardo Borkiewicz; 27, Carapachay	North Team			4th Voted Out; Day 12
Ricardo Nístico; 41, Lomas de Zamora	North Team			5th Voted Out; Day 15
Valeria Mercuri; 22, Buenos Aires	South Team	South Team		6th Voted Out; Day 18
Lidia Casciano; 43, San Fernando de la Buena Vista	South Team	South Team	Robinson	7th Voted Out; Day 22
Carla Cavalloni; 24, Once	South Team	South Team	Robinson	8th Voted Out; 1st Jury Member; Day 25
Pablo González; 27, La Plata	South Team	North Team	Robinson	9th Voted Out; 2nd Jury Member; Day 28
Javier Druetta; 31, Córdoba	South Team	South Team	Robinson	10th Voted Out; 3rd Jury Member; Day 31
Carlos Sisca; 51, Buenos Aires	South Team	South Team	Robinson	11th Voted Out; 4th Jury Member; Day 34
Marianela Docal; 24, Córdoba	North Team	North Team	Robinson	12th Voted Out; 5th Jury Member; Day 37
Mónica Penas Saavedra; 41, Buenos Aires	North Team	North Team	Robinson	13th Voted Out; 6th Jury Member; Day 38
Alejandro Colloca; 23, El Palomar	North Team	South Team	Robinson	Eliminated; 7th Jury Member; Day 38
Carla Levy; 29, Buenos Aires	North Team	North Team	Robinson	Runner-up; Day 39
María Victoria "Vick" Fernández; 29, Buenos Aires	South Team	South Team	Robinson	Sole Survivor; Day 39

== Game progress ==
Challenge winners and eliminations by episode
Episode title	Original air date	Challenge winner(s)		Eliminated	Finish
Episode title	Original air date	Reward	Immunity	Eliminated	Finish
"1"	September 19, 2001	Sur	Norte	Guillermo	1st voted out Day 3
"2"	September 26, 2001	Sur	Sur	Josefina	2nd voted out Day 6
"3"	October 3, 2001	Sur	Sur	Fernando	3rd voted out Day 9
"4"	October 10, 2001	Sur	Sur	Eduardo	4th voted out Day 12
"5"	October 17, 2001	Sur	Sur	Ricardo	5th voted out Day 15
"6"	October 24, 2001	Sur	Norte	Valeria	6th voted out Day 18
"7"	October 31, 2001	None	Pablo	Lidia	7th voted out Day 21
"8"	November 7, 2001	Carla L	Pablo	Carla C	8th voted out 1st jury member Day 24
"9"	November 14, 2001	Vick	Javier	Pablo	9th voted out 2nd jury member Day 27
"10"	November 21, 2001	Javier (Marianela)	Alejandro	Javier	10th voted out 3rd jury member Day 30
"11"	December 5, 2001	Carla L (Alejandro) (Mónica)	Vick	Carlos	11th voted out 4th jury member Day 33
"12"	December 12, 2001	Vick	Vick	Marianela	12th voted out 5th jury member Day 36
"13"	December 19, 2001	None	Vick	Mónica	13th voted out 6th jury member Day 39
"13"	December 19, 2001	None	Carla	Alejandro	14th voted out 7th jury member Day 40
"The Reunion"	December 19, 2001			Jury vote	
"The Reunion"	December 19, 2001			Carla	Runner-up
"The Reunion"	December 19, 2001			Vick	Sole Survivor

== Voting history ==
	Original tribes					Switched tribes	Merged tribe							
Episode	1	2	3	4	5	6	7	8	9	10	11	12	13	
Day	3	6	9	12	15	18	22	25	28	31	34	37	38	
Tribe	South	North	North	North	North	South	Robinson	Robinson	Robinson	Robinson	Robinson	Robinson	Robinson	Robinson
Eliminated	Guillermo	Josefina	Fernando	Eduardo	Ricardo	Valeria	Lidia	Carla C.	Pablo	Javier	Carlos	Marianela	Mónica	Alejandro
Vote	4-3-1	6-1-1	5-2	5-1	4-1	6-1	7-3	7-1-1	5-4	4-3-1	4-2-1	4-1-1	1-0	Challenge
Voter	Votes													
Vick	Guillermo					Valeria	Mónica	Javier	Carla L.	Carla L.	Marianela	Mónica	Mónica	
Carla L.		Josefina	Fernando	Eduardo	Ricardo		Lidia	Carla C.	Pablo	Javier	Carlos	Marianela		Won
Alejandro		Josefina	Fernando	Eduardo	Ricardo	Valeria	Lidia	Carla C.	Pablo	Javier	Carlos	Marianela		Lost
Mónica		Josefina	Fernando	Eduardo	Ricardo		Lidia	Carla C.	Pablo	Javier	Carlos	Marianela		
Marianela		Mónica	Fernando	Eduardo	Ricardo		Lidia	Carla C.	Pablo	Javier	Carlos	Carla L.		
Carlos	Carla C.					Valeria	Lidia	Carla C.	Carla L.	Carla L.	Marianela	Marianela		
Javier	Lidia					Valeria	Lidia	Carla C.	Carla L.	Carla L.	Carla L.			
Pablo	Lidia						Lidia	Carla C.	Carla L.	Alejandro				
Carla C.	Guillermo					Valeria	Mónica	Mónica	Pablo					
Lidia	Guillermo					Valeria	Mónica							
Valeria	Guillermo					Vick								
Ricardo		Josefina	Fernando	Eduardo	Marianela									
Eduardo		Josefina	Carla L.	Ricardo										
Fernando		Josefina	Carla L.											
Josefina		Fernando												
Guillermo	Lidia													

Jury vote
Episode	13	
Day	39	
Finalist	Vick	Carla L.
Votes	5-2	
Juror	Vote	
Alejandro		Yes
Mónica		Yes
Marianela	Yes	
Carlos	Yes	
Javier	Yes	
Pablo	Yes	
Carla C.	Yes	
