= La Aldea del Obispo =

Coordinates: 39°15′00″N 5°45′00″W

La Aldea del Obispo, Spain
- municipality
- Coat of arms
- Interactive map of La Aldea del Obispo, Spain
- Country: Spain
- Autonomous community: Extremadura
- Province: Cáceres
- Municipality: La Aldea del Obispo

Area
  - Total: 37 km^{2} (14 sq mi)

Population (2025-01-01)
  - Total: 290
  - Density: 7.8/km^{2} (20/sq mi)
- Time zone: UTC+1 (CET)
  - Summer (DST): UTC+2 (CEST)

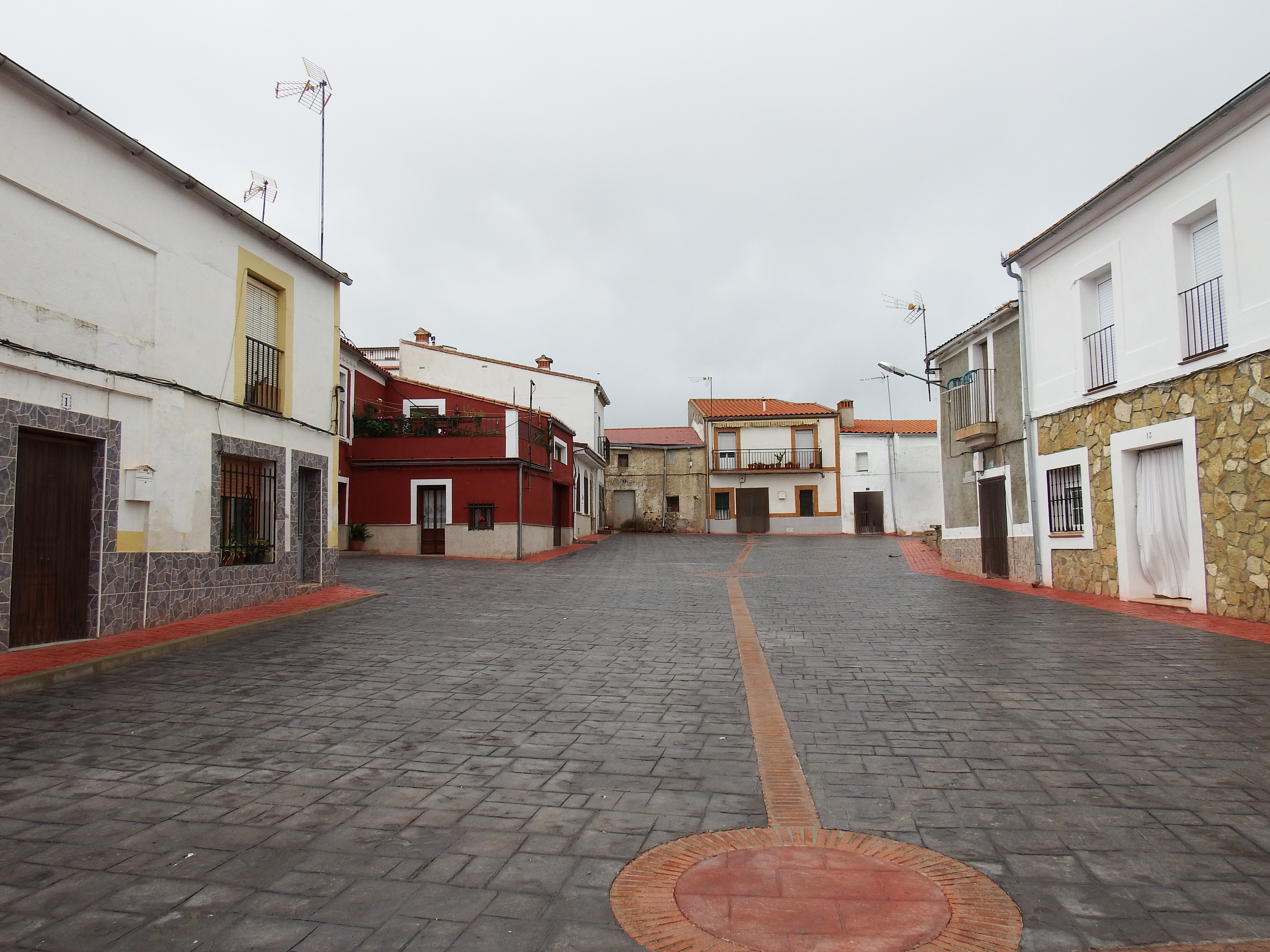
La Aldea del Obispo, Cáceres

La Aldea del Obispo is a municipality located in the province of Cáceres, Extremadura, Spain. According to the 2006 census (INE), the municipality has a population of 368 inhabitants.

== See also ==
- List of municipalities in Cáceres
