= Aldea de El Quejigal =

Village in Molinicos, Spain

Coordinates: 38°29′N 2°18′W

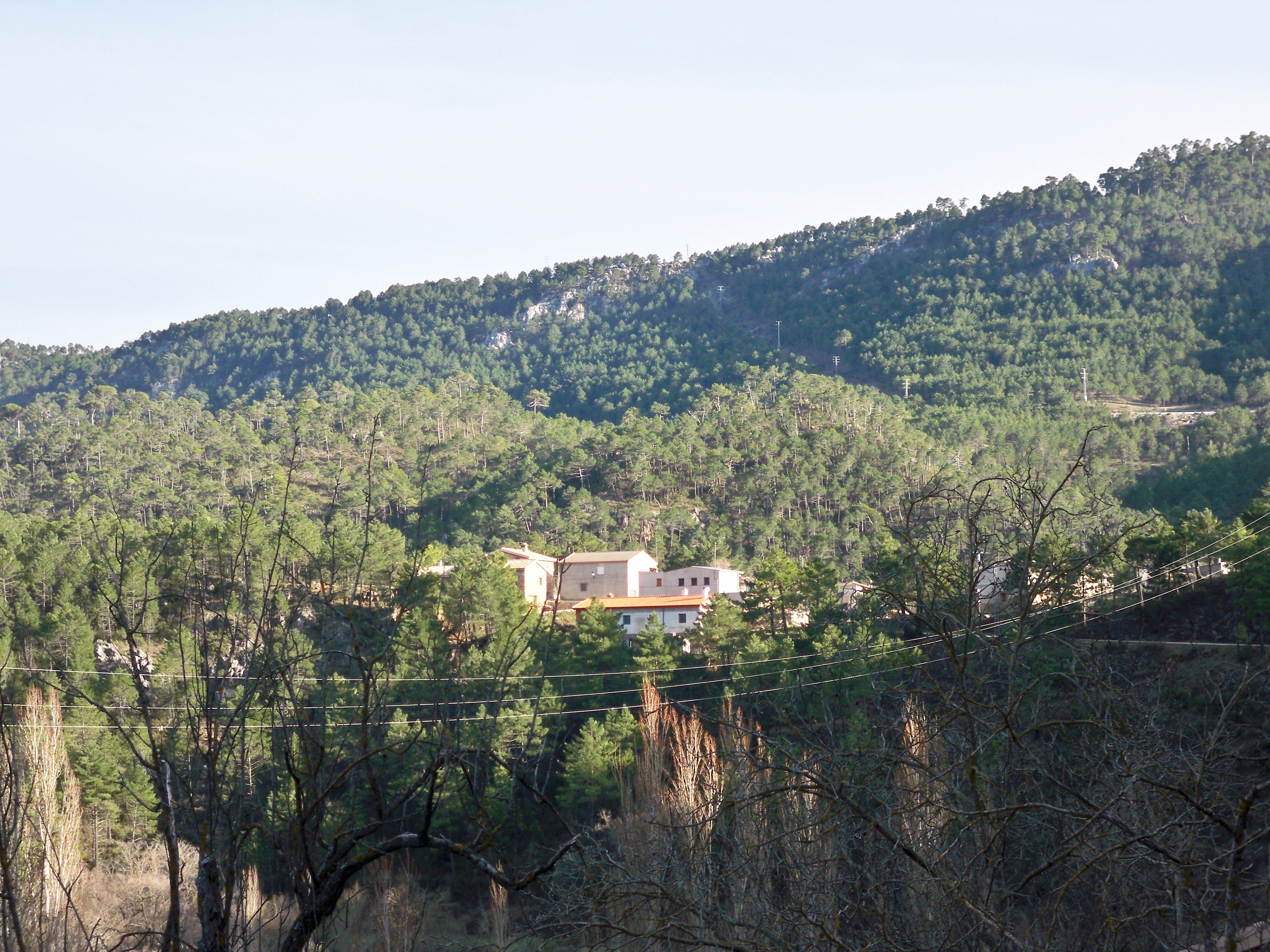
Panorama of the El Quejigal locality

Aldea de El Quejigal is a village in the municipality of Molinicos, province of Albacete, in the autonomous community of Castile-La Mancha, Spain.
