= Mount Guernsey =

Mountain in Graham Land, Antarctica

Mount Guernsey (69°20′S 68°14′W) is an isolated, mainly ice-covered mountain, 1,250 metres (4,100 ft) high, standing 6 nautical miles (11 km) north of the summit of Mount Edgell, on the west coast of the Antarctic Peninsula. The name "Ile Guernesey" was given in 1909 by the French Antarctic Expedition under Jean-Baptiste Charcot, after the island of Guernsey off the coast of France. The position of "Ile Guernesey" on the French expedition maps does not agree with that of the mountain described above, but from the narrative and sketches by Maurice Bongrain, the expedition surveyor, it has been determined that this mountain was the feature seen in 1909 by Charcot from a position near the center of the entrance to Marguerite Bay. The mountain was surveyed in 1936 by the British Graham Land Expedition, but no name was assigned. It was further surveyed by the Falkland Islands Dependencies Survey in 1948.
