= Aldea de San Miguel =

Coordinates: 41°28′N 4°37′W

Aldea de San Miguel, Spain
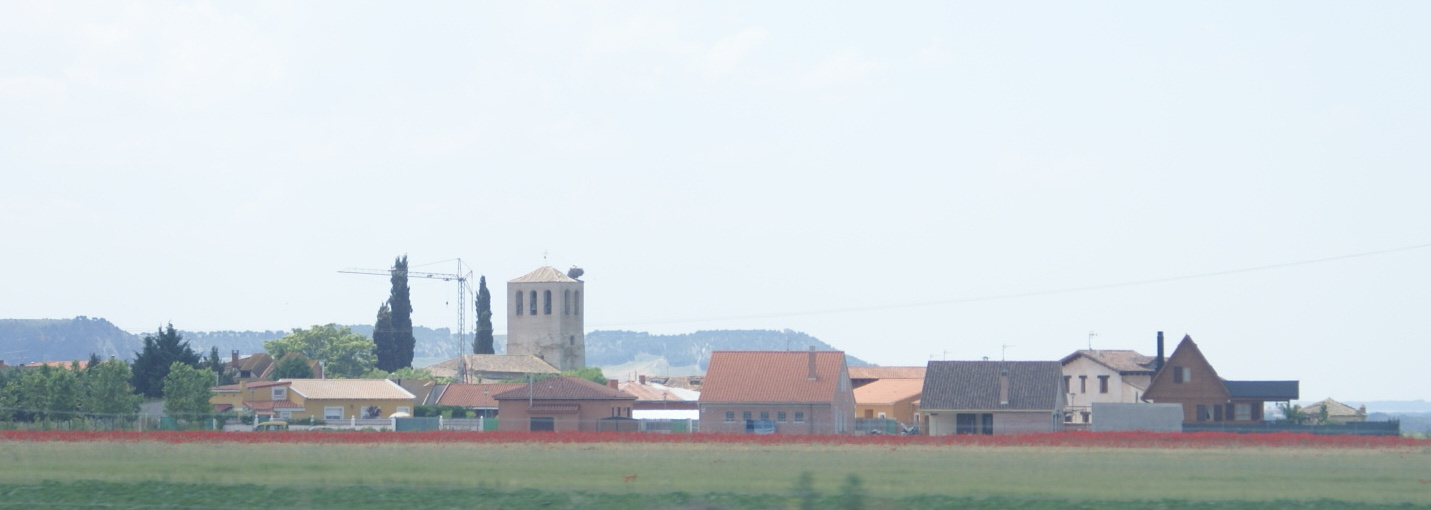
- View of the town
- Country: Spain
- Autonomous community: Castile and León
- Province: Valladolid
- Municipality: Aldea de San Miguel

Area
  - Total: 19.93 km^{2} (7.70 sq mi)
- Elevation: 740 m (2,430 ft)

Population (2025-01-01)
  - Total: 212
  - Density: 10.6/km^{2} (27.6/sq mi)
- Time zone: UTC+1 (CET)
  - Summer (DST): UTC+2 (CEST)

Aldea de San Miguel is a municipality located in the province of Valladolid, Castile and León, Spain. According to the 2004 census (INE), the municipality had a population of 212 inhabitants.

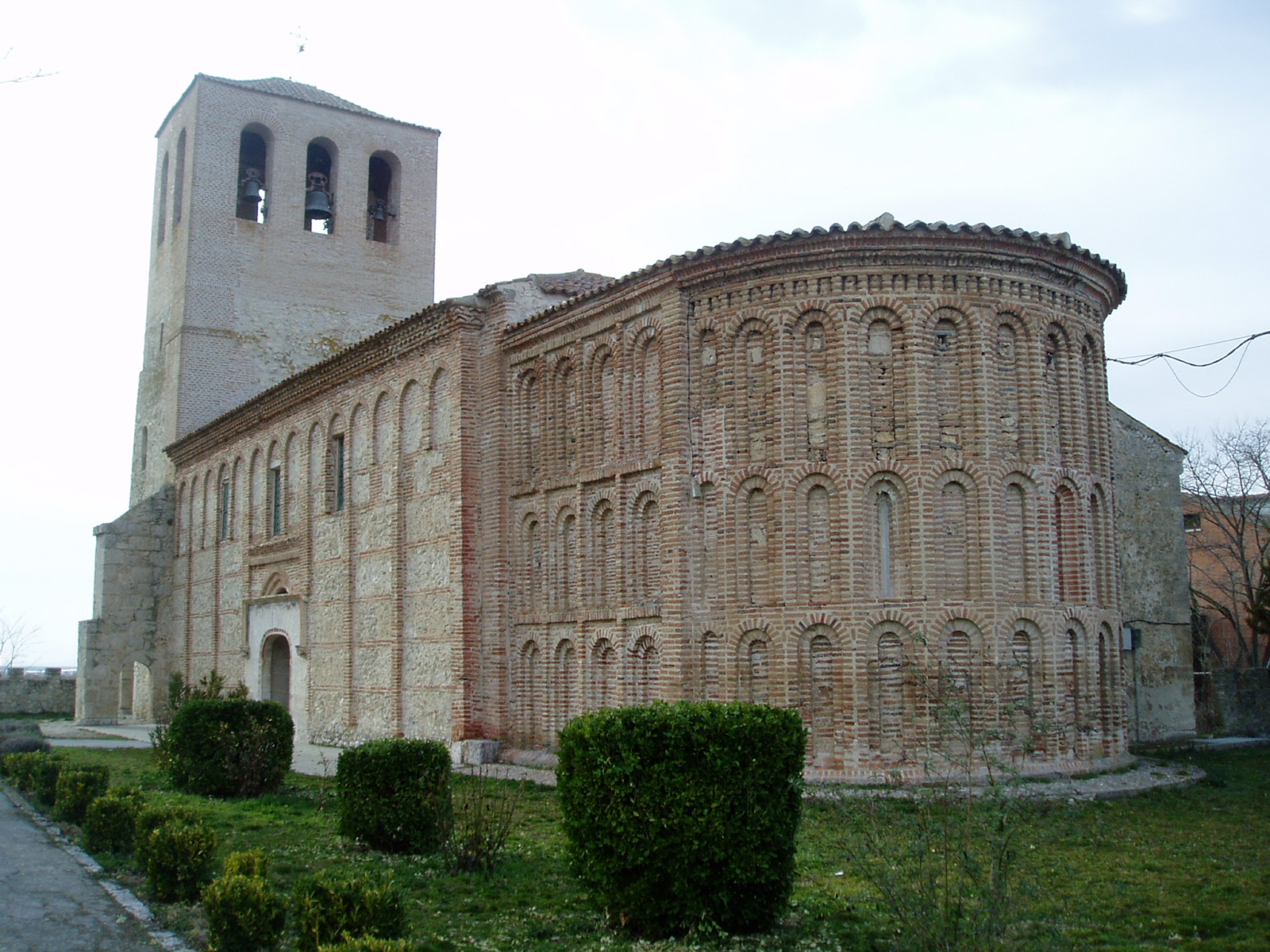
Church of San Miguel
