= Aldea Asunción =

Coordinates: 32°49′S 59°14′W

- Municipality and village
- Interactive map of Aldea Asunción
- Country: Argentina
- Province: Entre Ríos Province
- Time zone: UTC−3 (ART)

Aldea Asunción is a village and municipality in north-eastern Entre Ríos Province in Argentina.
