= Aldea de Mesones =

Coordinates: 38°29′N 2°21′W

- Village
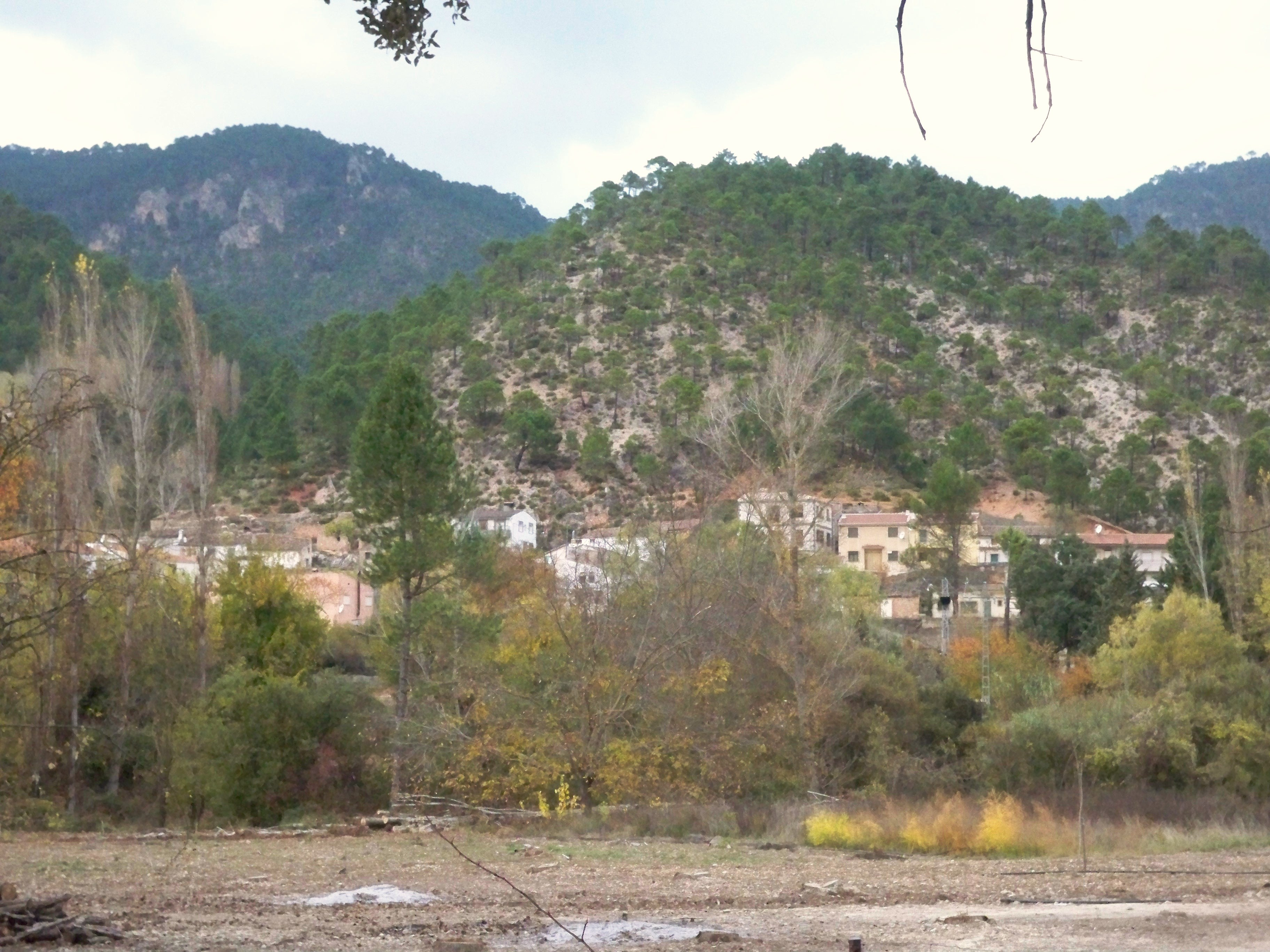
- Vista de Mesones - Molinicos (Albacete)
- Country: Spain
- Autonomous community: Castile-La Mancha
- Province: Albacete
- Municipality: Molinicos

Population
  - Total: 25
- Postal code: 02449

Aldea de Mesones is a village in the municipality of Molinicos, province of Albacete, in the autonomous community of Castile-La Mancha, Spain.
