= Aldea de Pinilla =

Aldea de Pinilla Pinilla
- Location Aldea de Pinilla (Spain)
- Coordinates: 38°29′42″N 2°13′34″W
- Country: Spain
- Community: Castilla-La Mancha
- Province: Albacete
- Municipality: Molinicos
- Elevation: 990 m (3,250 ft)
- Postal code: 02448

Aldea de Pinilla is a village in the municipality of Molinicos, province of Albacete, in the autonomous community of Castile-La Mancha, Spain.
