= Expedición Robinson 2000 =

- Season 1
- Presented by: Julian Weich
- No. of days: 49
- No. of castaways: 16
- Winner: Sebastián Martino
- Runner-up: Adrián Miani
- Location: Panama
- No. of episodes: 13

Release
- Original network: Canal 13
- Original release: October 2 – December 2, 2000

Season chronology
- Next → 2001

Expedición Robinson 2000 is the first season of the Argentine version of the Swedish show Expedition Robinson, or Survivor as it is called in some countries, and was aired in late 2000. This season took place on an island in Panama.

== Season summary ==
During the pre-merge portion of the competition the North team initially proved to be the weaker team after losing the first two immunity challenges, however in the end the South team proved to be weaker as they lost the last four immunity challenges. Shortly after the merge the former North team members turned on each other, voting out three of their own. When it came time for the final four, the remaining contestants competed in two challenges to determine who would be the final two. Ultimately, Sebastián Martino who won this season over Adrián Miani by a close 4-3 jury vote.

== Contestants ==
List of Expedición Robinson 2000 contestants
Contestant	Original Tribe	Merged Trbie	Finish
María Heyde; 25,	South Team		1st Voted Out; Day 4
Laura Genovese; 31, Balvanera	South Team		2nd Voted Out; Day 7
Andrea Álvarez; 25, Buenos Aires	North Team		3rd Voted Out; Day 10
Ezequiel Gastón Oliva; 23,	South Team		4th Voted Out; Day 13
Guillermo Tissone; 50, Lanús	South Team		5th Voted Out; Day 17
Libia Cambra; 27, Rawson	North Team		6th Voted out Day 20
Mariana Costelli; 30, Necochea	North Team	Robinson	7th Voted Out; Day 24
Daniel "Capi" Serenelli; 50, Bariloche	North Team	Robinson	8th Voted Out; 1st Jury Member; Day 28
Diego "Winner" Garibotti; 30, Lobos	North Team	Robinson	9th Voted Out; 2nd Jury Member; Day 31
Armando Liussi de Paoli; 32, Buenos Aires	South Team	Robinson	10th Voted Out; 3rd Jury Member; Day 35
Consuelo Lyonnett; 29, Buenos Aires	South Team	Robinson	11th Voted Out; 4th Jury Member; Day 39
Rodrigo "Chopper" Bedoya; 21,	North Team	Robinson	12th Voted Out; 5th Jury Member; Day 45
María "Marisa" Correas; 25, Buenos Aires	South Team	Robinson	13th Voted Out; 6th Jury Member; Day 47
Emilia "Picky" Paino; 20, San Fernando	North Team	Robinson	Lost Challenge; 7th Jury Member; Day 48
Adrián Miani; 33, Quilmes	South Team	Robinson	Runner-up; Day 49
Sebastián Martino; 26, Buenos Aires	North Team	Robinson	Robinson; Day 49

== Game progress ==
Episode	Date shown on TV	Challenges		Eliminated	Finish
Episode	Date shown on TV	Reward	Immunity	Eliminated	Finish
#1	2 October 2000	None	North Team	María	1st Voted Out; Day 4
#2	????, 2000	South Team	North Team	Laura	2nd Voted Out; Day 7
#3	????, 2000	North Team	South Team	Andrea	3rd Voted Out; Day 10
#4	????, 2000	North Team	North Team	Gastón	4th Voted Out; Day 13
#5	????, 2000	North Team	North Team	Guillermo	5th Voted Out; Day 17
#6	????, 2000	South Team	South Team	Libia	6th Voted Out; Day 20
#7	????, 2000	None	Diego	Mariana	7th Voted Out; Day 24
#8	????, 2000	Sebastián	Sebastián	Daniel	8th Voted Out; 1st Jury Member; Day 28
#9	????, 2000	Diego [Picky]	Adrián	Diego	9th Voted Out; 2nd Jury Member; Day 31
#10	????, 2000	Sebastián	Adrián	Armando	10th Voted Out; 3rd Jury Member; Day 35
#11	????, 2000	Auction	Sebastián	Consuelo	11th Voted Out; 4th Jury Member; Day 39
#12	????, 2000	Rodrigo [Adrián]	Picky	Rodrigo	12th Voted Out; 5th Jury Member; Day 45
#13	2 December 2000	None	Sebastián	Marisa	13th Voted Out; 6th Jury Member; Day 47
#13	2 December 2000	None	Adrián	Picky	Lost challenge 7th Jury Member; Day 48
#13	2 December 2000	Jury vote		Adrián	Runner-Up; Day 49
#13	2 December 2000	Jury vote		Sebastián	Sole Survivor; Day 49

== Voting history ==
	Original tribes						Merged tribe							
Episode	1	2	3	4	5	6	7	8	9	10	11	12	13	
Day	4	7	10	13	17	20	24	28	31	35	39	45	47	48
Tribe	South	South	North	South	South	North	Robinson	Robinson	Robinson	Robinson	Robinson	Robinson	Robinson	Robinson
Eliminated	María	Laura	Andrea	Gastón	Guillermo	Libia	Mariana	Daniel	Diego	Armando	Consuelo	Rodrigo	Marisa	Picky
Vote	7-1	5-2	7-1	3-2-1	3-2	4-3	9-1	5-3-1	4-4-1	4-4	4-3	3-2-1	1-0	Challenge
Voter	Votes													
Sebastián			Andrea			Libia	Mariana	Armando	Armando	Consuelo	Consuelo	Rodrigo	Marisa	
Adrián	María	Laura		Guillermo	Guillermo		Mariana	Daniel	Diego	Armando	Picky	Marisa		Won
Picky			Andrea			Daniel	Mariana	Daniel	Armando	Consuelo	Consuelo	Rodrigo		Lost
Marisa	María	Laura		Gastón	Guillermo		Mariana	Rodrigo	Diego	Armando	Picky	Rodrigo		
Rodrigo			Andrea			Libia	Mariana	Daniel	Armando	Armando	Consuelo	Marisa		
Consuelo	María	Guillermo		Gastón	Guillermo		Mariana	Daniel	Diego	Armando	Picky	Picky		
Armando	María	Laura		Marisa	Consuelo		Mariana	Daniel	Diego	Consuelo	Consuelo			
Diego			Andrea			Libia	Mariana	Armando	Armando	Consuelo				
Daniel			Andrea			Libia	Mariana	Armando	Picky					
Mariana			Andrea			Daniel	Consuelo							
Libia			Andrea			Daniel								
Guillermo	María	Laura		Gastón	Consuelo									
Gastón	María	Laura		Marisa										
Andrea			Rodrigo											
Laura	María	Guillermo												
María	Guillermo													

Jury vote
Episode	13	
Day	49	
Finalist	Sebastián	Adrián
Votes	4-3	
Juror	Vote	
Picky	Yes	
Marisa	Yes	
Rodrigo		Yes
Consuelo		Yes
Armando		Yes
Diego	Yes	
Daniel	Yes	
