= Los Alejos =

Coordinates: 38°30′N 2°14′W

Los Alejos is a village in the municipality of Molinicos, province of Albacete, in the autonomous community of Castile-La Mancha, Spain.
