= Aldea Salto =

- Municipality and village
- Location within Argentina
- Coordinates: 31°57′S 60°33′W
- Country: Argentina
- Province: Entre Ríos Province
- Time zone: UTC−3 (ART)

Aldea Salto is a village and municipality in north-eastern Entre Ríos Province in Argentina.
