= Aldea del Pinar =

Coordinates: 41°52′N 3°10′W

Aldea del Pinar is a village in the southeastern province of Burgos, Castilla y León, Spain. It is known for its annual January festival celebrating the Feasts of the Sweet Name of Jesus.

== See also ==
- List of municipalities in Burgos
