= Aldea San Juan =

- Municipality and village
- Location within Argentina Location within South America
- Coordinates: 32°42′S 58°46′W
- Country: Argentina
- Province: Entre Ríos Province
- Time zone: UTC−3 (ART)

Aldea San Juan is a village, rural center and municipality in Entre Ríos Province in north-eastern Argentina. It is located 42 km north of Gualeguaychú city and has a population of 466 inhabitants (INDEC, 2001). The main local activity is agriculture, which is the economy's driving force. It was founded by a group of Volga German immigrants. It has an Evangelical Temple, a Lutheran Temple, and Volga German descendants' associations.

== History ==
These lands were owned by Jacobo Spangenberg, who sold them to Volga German colonists in 1889. Nineteen families arrived from the Volga. They subsequently founded three villages: San Juan, Aldea San Antonio and Santa Celia. Thirty families established residence in San Juan, most of them from Bauer and Messer in the Volga basin.
