= Aldea Protestante =

- Municipality and village
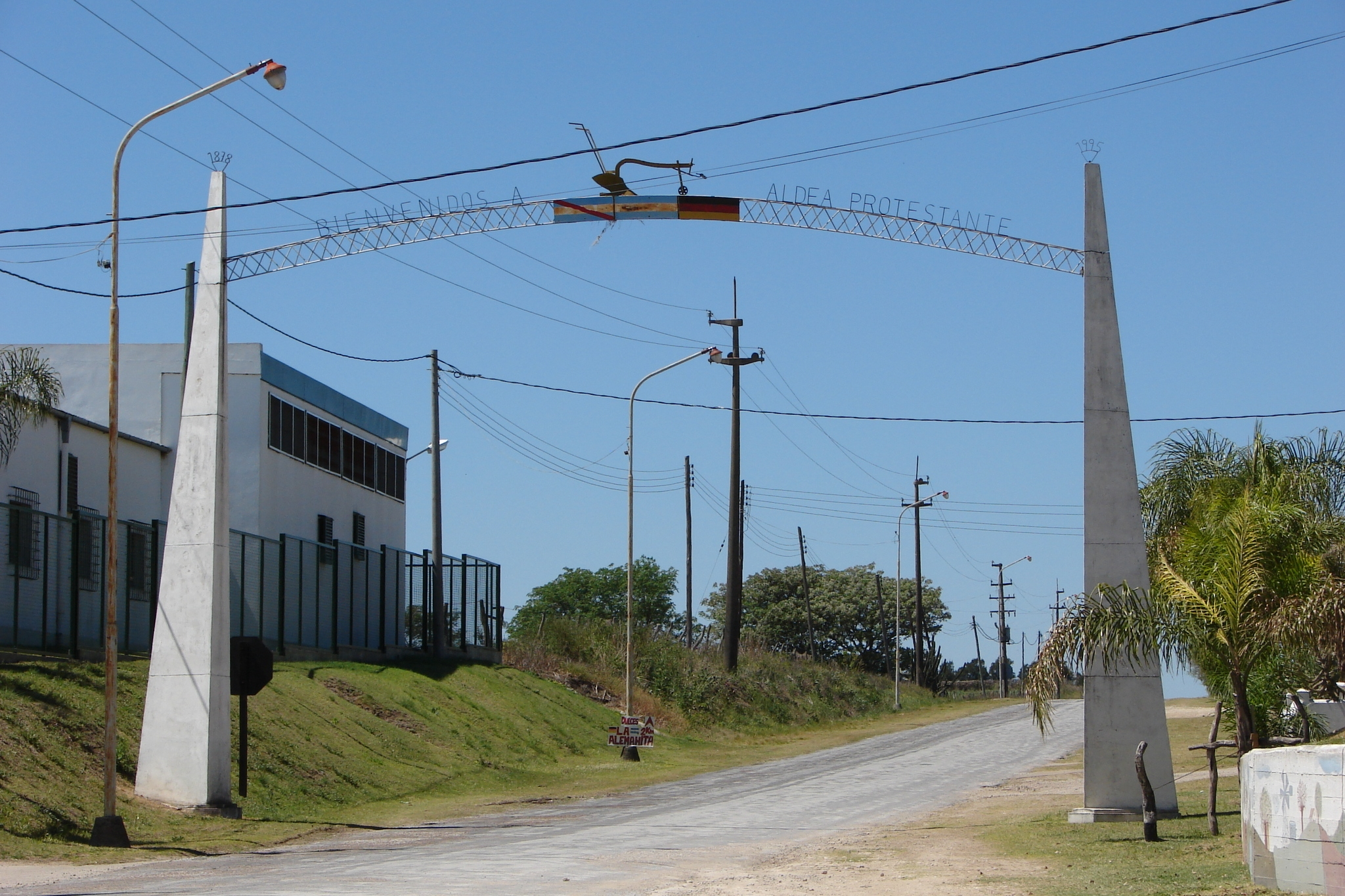
- Street of Aldea Protestante

- Location within Argentina
- Coordinates: 32°02′S 60°34′W
- Country: Argentina
- Province: Entre Ríos Province
- Time zone: UTC−3 (ART)

Aldea Protestante is a village and municipality in north-eastern Entre Ríos Province in Argentina.
