= German Argentines =

Argentine citizens of German descent

Deutsch-Argentinier (German) Germano-argentinos (Spanish)
- (Argentina) (Germany)
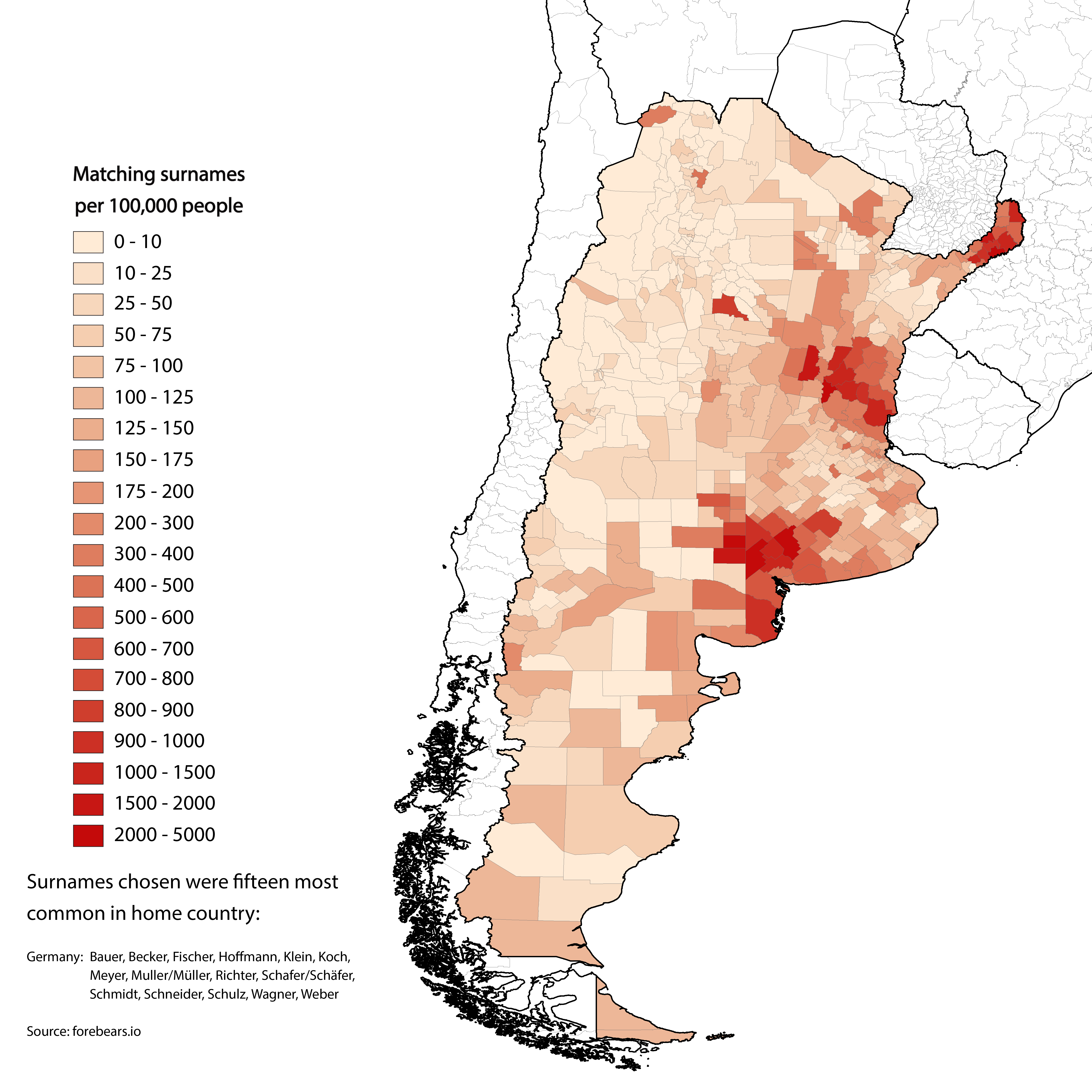
- People per 100,000 inhabitants in Argentina with one of the 15 most common German surnames.

Total population
- 7,888 (by birth, 2023): 600,000 German descendants. (German embassy); 1,000,000 German descendants in 1992. (Hospital Alemán de Argentina); 2,500,000 Volga German descendants; 600,000 to 2,500,000 (by ancestry); 4% to 7%

Regions with significant populations
- Mesopotamia, Buenos Aires Metropolitan Area and Northern Patagonia.

Languages
- Spanish · German (notably Riograndese Hunsrik and Paraná-Wolga-Deutsch)

Religion
- Majority: Catholicism · Irreligion; Minority: Protestantism • Judaism

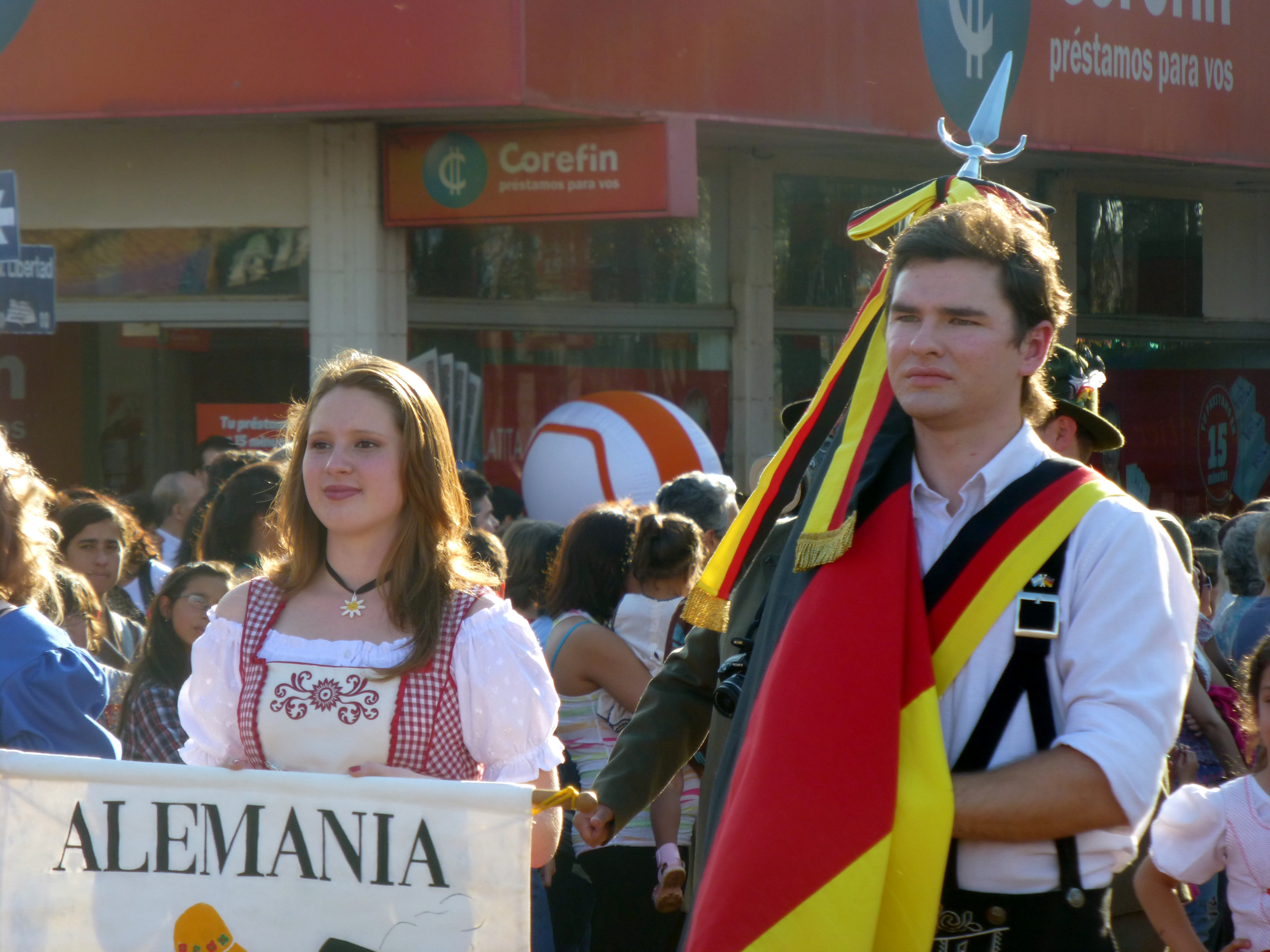
German Argentines during the Immigrant's Festival in Oberá, Misiones

German Argentines (German: Deutschargentinier, Spanish: germano-argentinos) are Argentines of German ancestry as well as German citizens living in Argentina.

They are descendants of Germans who immigrated to Argentina from Germany and most notably from other places in Europe such as the Volga region, Austria and the Banat. Since Germany as a political entity was founded in 1871, the German language and culture have been more important than the country of origin, as the basis of the Argentine-German identity.

Some German Argentines originally settled in Brazil, then later immigrated to Argentina. Today, German Argentines make up the fifth-largest ethnic group in Argentina, with over two million citizens of Volga German descent alone.

German Argentines have founded German schools such as the Hölters Schule and German-language newspapers such as the Argentinisches Tageblatt ("Argentine Daily"). German descendants even make up the majority of the population in several localities in the interior of the country.

== German immigration to Argentina ==
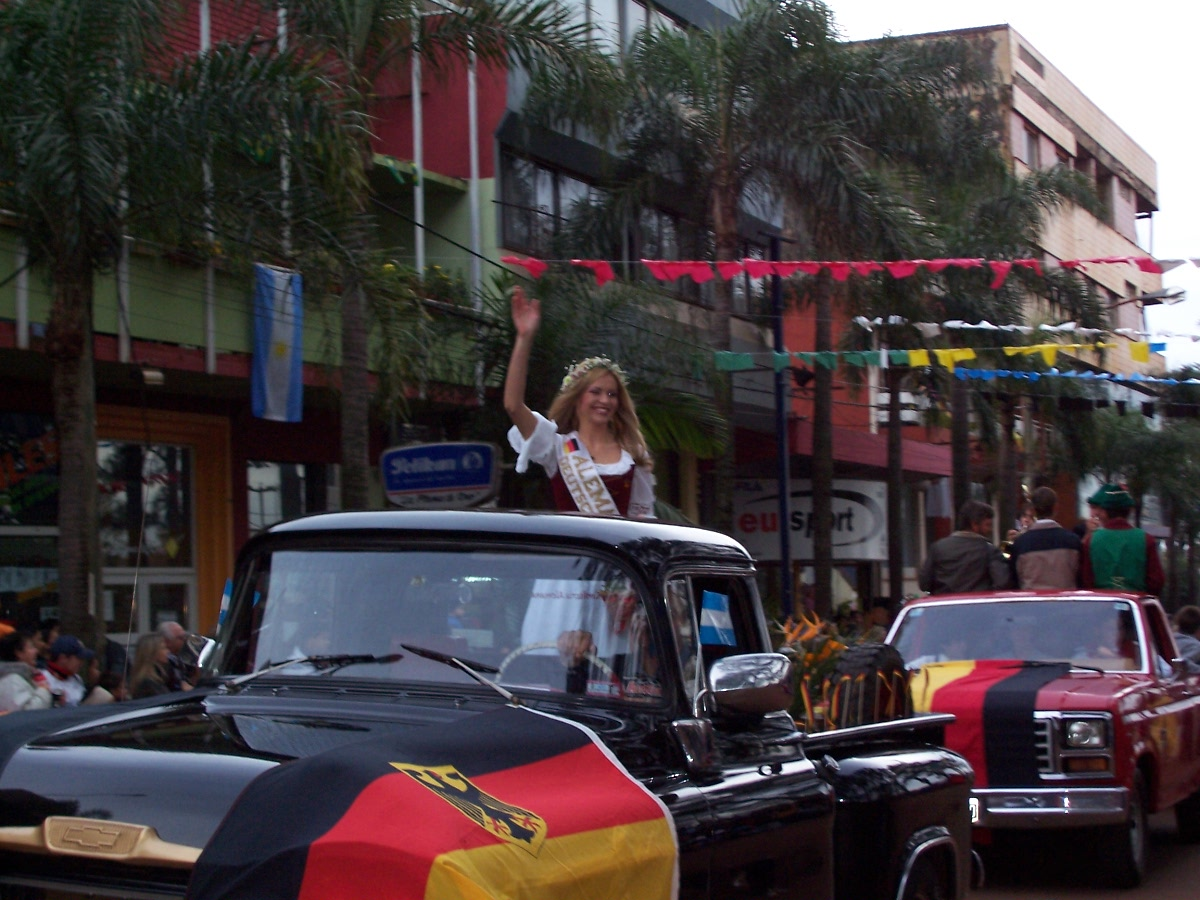
Queen of the German Collectivity in the Fiesta Nacional del Inmigrante in Oberá, Misiones.

Between 1869 and World War I the population of Argentina quadrupled due to an influx of millions of European immigrants during the Great European immigration wave to the country. German communities developed in the city of Buenos Aires and in several provinces, such as in the center and South of Buenos Aires Province (around towns such as Coronel Suárez, Olavarría, Tornquist, etc.), in Entre Ríos Province, in the East of La Pampa Province, in Misiones Province, in Córdoba Province, in some localities of the Chaco Province, etc. Meanwhile, the urban German population settled in the city of Buenos Aires also developed their own German schools, hospitals, shops, theaters, sports clubs, and banks. Many of those who immigrated directly from Germany and settled in cities were assimilated into the upper-middle class of Buenos Aires, but maintained strong ties to German culture, providing their children with a German education so they would not be at a disadvantage if they returned to Germany.

Percentage of immigrants from the German Empire within Argentina's divisions, according to the 1914 Argentine census. Most of the Germans who arrived in Argentina did so from lands that were outside the German borders, and therefore are not represented on this map.

German immigration to Argentina occurred during five main time periods: pre–1870, 1870–1914, 1918–1933, 1933–1940 and post–1945. In the first period numbers were generally low; of note are the colonias alemanas, first founded in the province of Buenos Aires in 1827. During the second period, Argentina experienced a boom in immigration due to massive economic expansion in the port of Buenos Aires and the wheat and beef producing Pampas. German immigrants began establishing themselves and developing newspapers, schools, and social clubs. A new, Germanic-Argentine identity gradually developed among the population. During and at the end of the First World War, German and other European communities in Buenos Aires struggled between old and new identities.

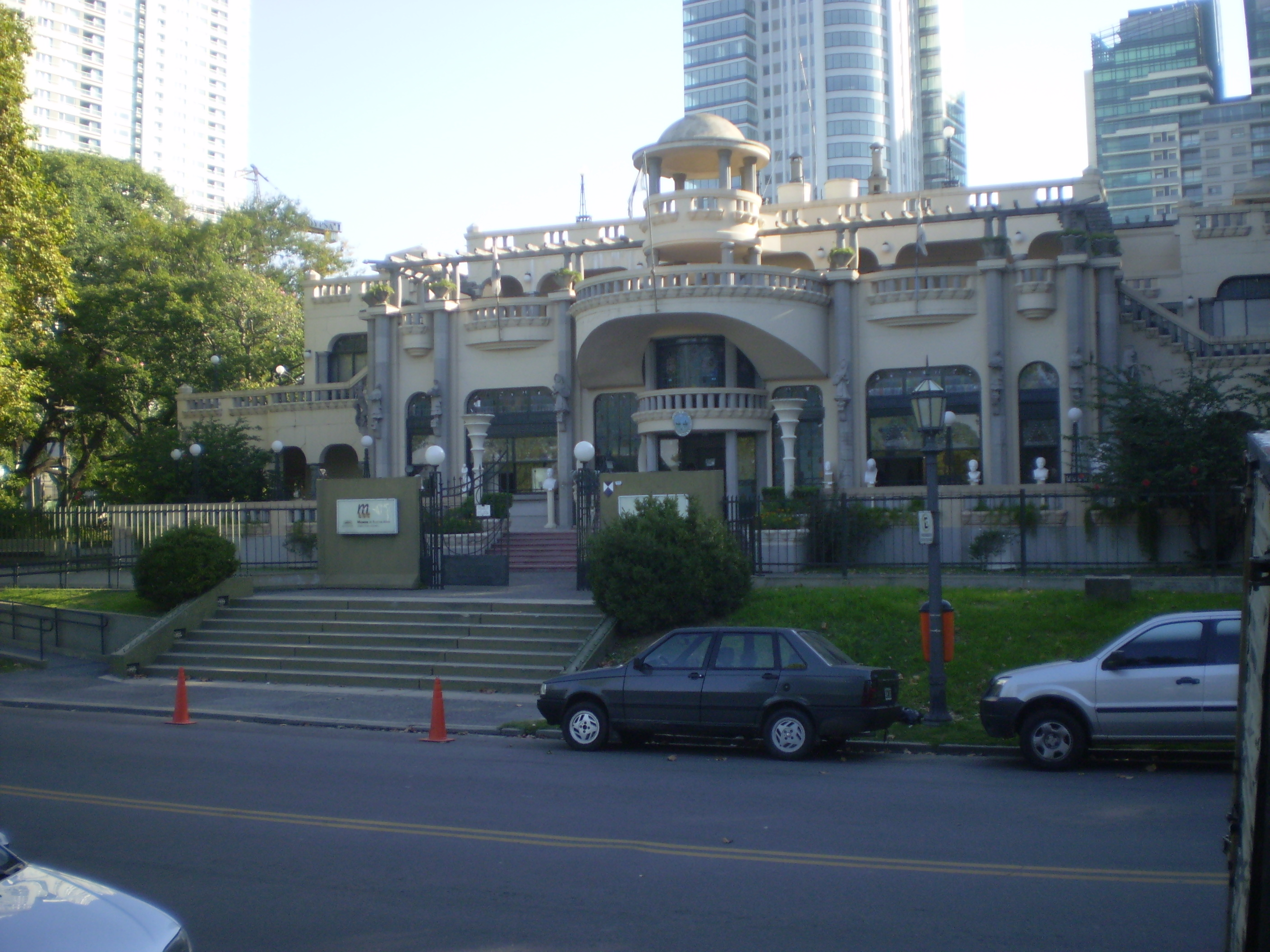
The former Münich Beer Hall, now the Municipal Museums Administration, Buenos Aires.

During the third period, after a pause due to World War I, immigration to Argentina resumed and Germans came in their largest numbers. This can be attributed to increased immigration restrictions in the United States and Brazil as well as the deteriorating conditions in post-World War I Europe. The two largest years of German immigration to Argentina were 1923 and 1924, with approximately 10,000 each year. This period is of particular interest because the older groups of German speakers began to feel a sense of cultural crisis due to the assimilation policies of the Argentine state, while the newcomers gave renewed life to German cultural institutions and created new ones. Between 1905 and 1933, the number of German schools rose from 59 to 176. Though found throughout Argentina, over 80% of these were located in Buenos Aires Province, Misiones, or Entre Ríos in 1933. Furthermore, attendance at German schools rose from 3,300 in 1905 to 12,900 in 1933.

During the penultimate period, from 1933 to 1940, Argentina experienced another surge in German immigration. The majority were Jews from Germany although German opponents of Nazism also arrived. Half of the 45,000 German speakers who immigrated at this time settled in the city of Buenos Aires. They comprised 2.3% of total immigration to the country, as mass migration to Argentina was slowing. These arrivals supported and were supported by the Argentinisches Tageblatt, which established itself as a strong anti-Nazi voice in Buenos Aires.

The final period of German immigration to Argentina occurred between 1946 and 1950, when President Juan Perón ordered the creation of a ratline for prominent Nazis, collaborators and other fascists from Europe. During this period, Argentine diplomats and intelligence officers, on Perón's instructions, favored the settlement of former German political leaders.

The country received 12,000 immigrants from Germany between 1946 and 1952, a smaller number than in previous periods. This meant that the concepts of acculturation and linguistic and cultural persistence were not dealt with in the same way. The group did not congregate as tightly and participated more in general culture. Further, due to Anti-German sentiment that followed World War II, the pre-existing process of assimilation was not met with resistance by the new arrivals.

== Volga German immigration to Argentina ==
Percentage of people born in the Russian Empire (1914 Argentine census)

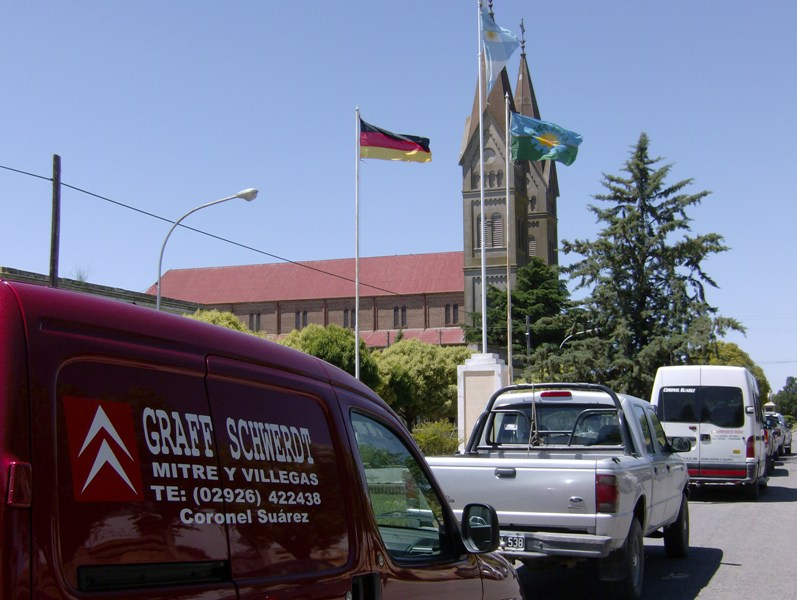
Flags of Argentina, Buenos Aires Province and Germany in front of St. Joseph Catholic Church in San José, Coronel Suárez Partido, Argentina

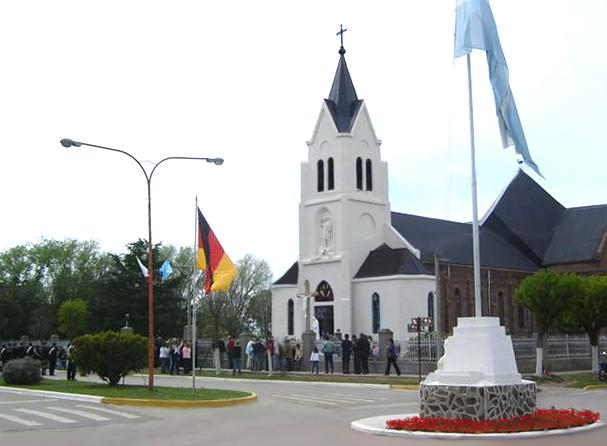
San Miguel Arcángel, Buenos Aires Province. Both towns are two examples of Volga German colonization in the interior of Buenos Aires Province. Nowadays, both are still almost entirely populated by their remnant descendants who did not migrate to surrounding cities.

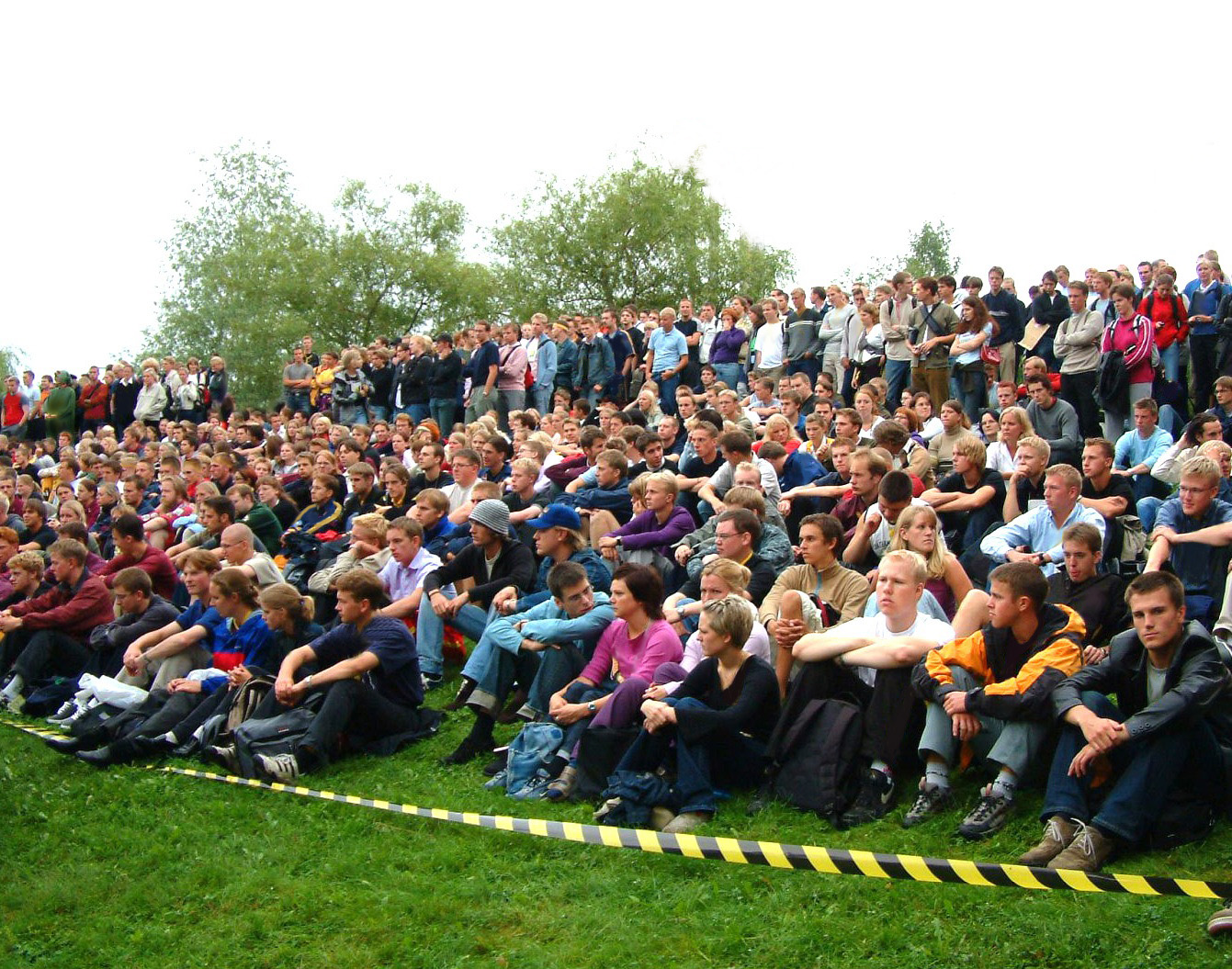
German Argentines from Crespo, Entre Ríos

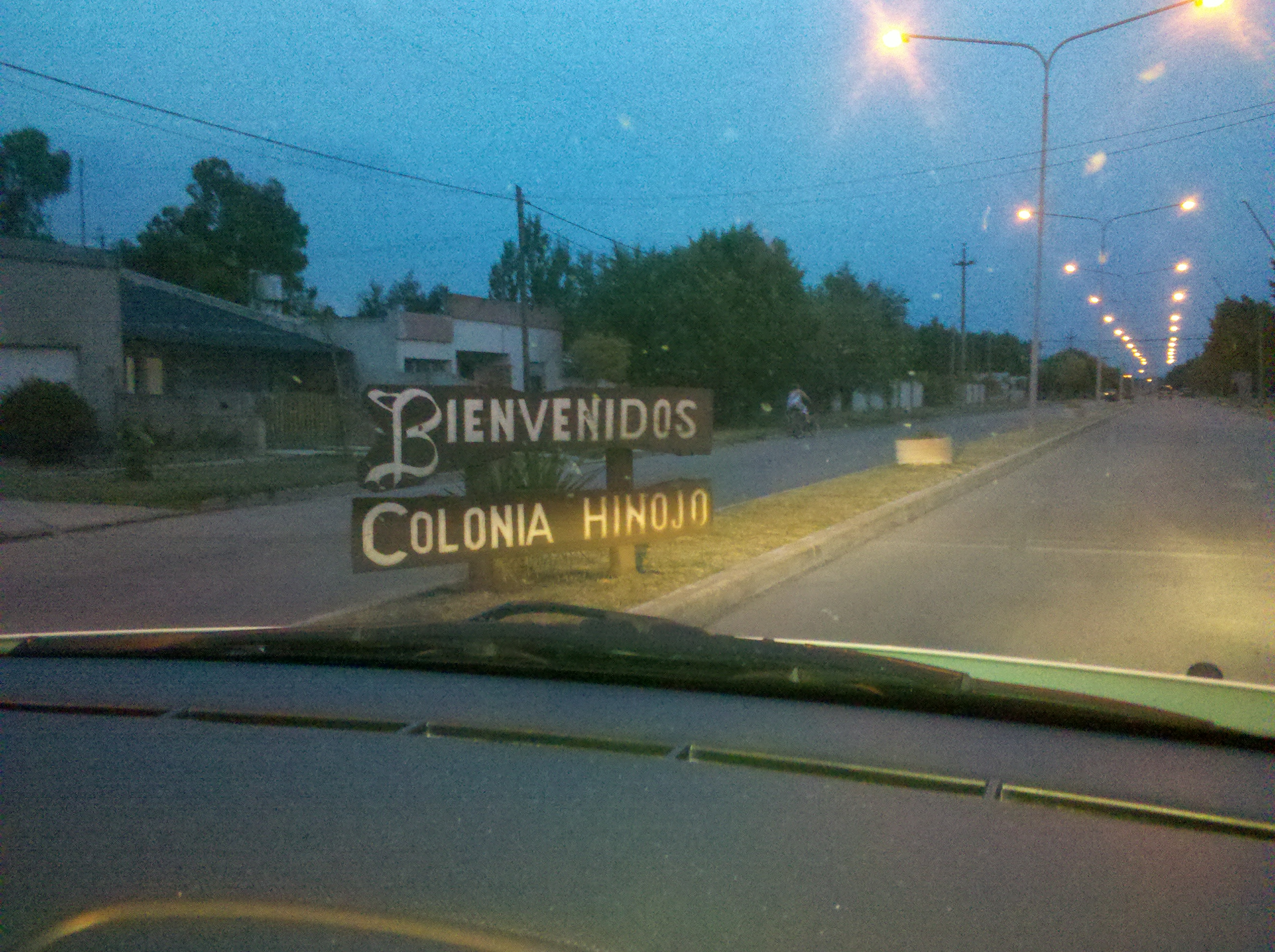
Entrance to Colonia Hinojo

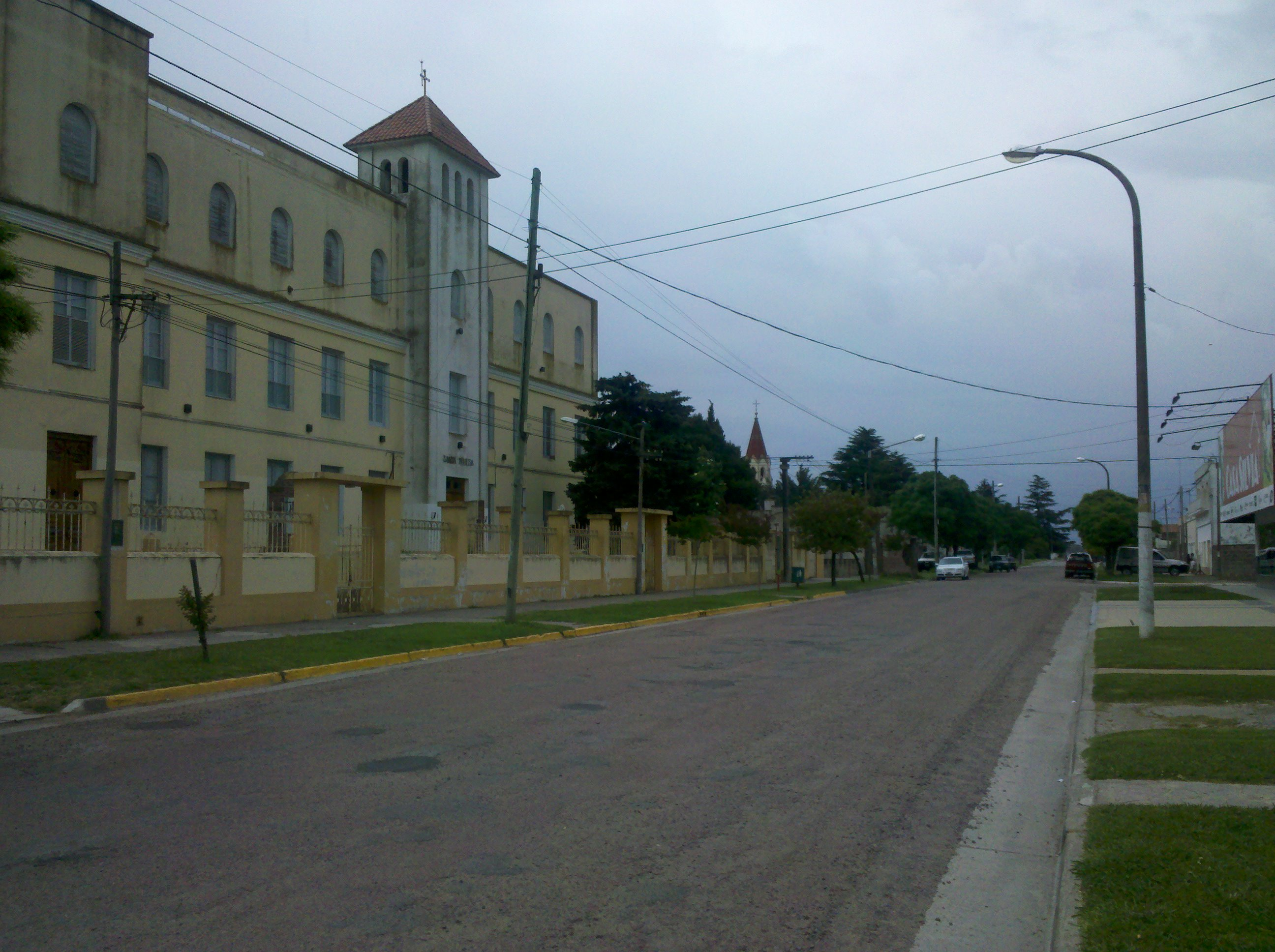
Santa Teresa Elementary and High School

Upon the invitation of Catherine the Great, 30,000 Germans immigrated to the Volga valley of Russia to establish 104 German villages from 1764 to 1767. A century after the first Germans had settled in the Volga region, Russia passed legislation that revoked many of the privileges promised to them by Catherine the Great. The sentiment in Russia became decidedly anti-German. Russia first made changes to the German local government. In 1874, a new military law decreed that all male Russian subjects, when they reached the age of 20, were eligible to serve in the military for 6 years. For the German colonists, this law represented a breach of faith. In the 1880s the Russian government began a subtle attack on the German schools.

Just when Russia was abridging the privileges granted to the Germans in an earlier era, several nations in the Americas were attempting to attract settlers by offering inducements reminiscent of those of Catherine the Great. Soon after the military service bill became law, both Protestant and Catholic Volga Germans gathered and chose delegations to journey across the Atlantic Ocean to examine settlement conditions in countries like the United States, Argentina, Brazil and Canada.

Many Catholic Volga Germans chose South America as their new homeland because the official religion in Brazil and Argentina was Roman Catholic. The ratio of Catholic to Protestant Volga Germans in South America was 7 to 1. The opposite was true in Russia, Protestant Volga Germans outnumbered Catholics by about 2 to 1. So despite the numerous stories told of Volga German immigrants being diverted to South America against their will or being sent there because they were denied entry to the US for health reasons, Brazil and Argentina were the planned destination of many Catholic Volga German immigrants.

Under the guidance of Andreas Basgall, Volga Germans started to relocate to Argentina from Brazil in December 1877, and in January 1878 they founded the first Volga German Colony Hinojo, in the province of Buenos Aires.

Some large groups of Volga Germans on ships destined for Brazil were diverted to Argentina. These people settled in Colonia General Alvear in the province of Entre Ríos, which was made up of 6 Volga German villages. Additional Volga Germans, some from Brazil and others directly from Russia, arrived in Argentina over the next few years. Many other Volga Germans settled in colonies around the city of Coronel Suárez, in Buenos Aires Province.

The first census of the Volga Germans in Argentina was performed on March 31, 1881, in "Colonia General Alvear", Entre Rios Province. A complete census index of all the villages within the colony villages can be found here . This colony was composed of 6 villages: Asunción (Spatzenkutter), Concepción (Valle María), San José (Brasilera), Agricultores (Protestante), San Francisco (Pfeiffer), and Salto (Koeller). This census provides the date of arrival in the Colony (24 groups between 22 and 01-1878 and 24–04–1880), name, nationality, marital status, age and literacy. Five of six villages were Catholic. The single Lutheran village was Agricultores (Protestante or Protestantendorf).

From both starting points of Colonia General Alvear and of Colonia Hinojo they spread in all directions. There are still fifteen villages in Entre Ríos populated by descendants of the original settlers, twelve of them are of Catholic origin, and the remaining three, Protestant. Currently, in Entre Ríos Province, most habitantes of Volga German descent live in towns like Crespo, Ramírez, Urdinarrain, Galarza, and Maciá where they make up the majority of the population. Expansion from Colonia Hinojo went westwards comprising South of Buenos Aires Province and East of La Pampa Province; from there they reached Córdoba Province and Chaco Province. In La Pampa Province, Catholic settlers arrived from the South of Buenos Aires Province and Protestants did it from Entre Ríos Province. The former founded Santa María Colony and Santa Teresa Colony, the latter Guatraché, General San Martín, and Alpachiri (source: "Los Alemanes del Volga" 1977 Victor Popp - Nicolás Dening).

At the end of the 19th century and the beginning of the 20th century, Argentina was a liberal country with a very high GDP per capita. In contrast to their Volga German countrymen in Russia, they would never be exiled, they did not experience famines like the Soviet famine of 1930–1933 in the Volga region nor any mass shootings and deportation as under Stalin's regime. Finally, they were never dispossessed, they kept their land and their animals – something they remain proud of to this day. The immigration of Germans from Russia to Argentina kept a steady pace until the beginning of World War I. Crespo in Entre Ríos Province and Coronel Suárez in Buenos Aires Province became the most outstanding centers of colonization, as in both cities people of Volga German descent make up the majority of the population. At present, the descendants of these people live disseminated all over Argentina. The numerous progeny of the founders and the division and distribution of their properties into smaller lots forced many of them to abandon the original colonization sites and find new occupations, frequently in towns or cities near the original colonies.

The fact that Argentina appears among the most important grain producers of the world is, in part, the responsibility of its citizens of Volga German origin.

Today the population of Volga German descent alone is well over 2 million in Argentina.

== Historical ties between Argentina and Germany ==
Argentina and Germany had close ties to each other since the first wave of German immigration to Argentina. A flourishing relationship developed between Germany and Argentina as early as the German Unification, with Germany eventually coming to hold a privileged position in the Argentine economy. Later on, Argentina maintained a strong economic relationship with both Imperial Germany and the British Empire, supporting both their wartime economies with supply shipments during World War I.

The military connection between Argentina and Prussia has often been emphasized, and sympathy for Germany among the general staff in Buenos Aires contributed to establishing Argentina's policy of neutrality during the First and most of Second World Wars. Great Britain and the United States became aware of the threat that some of Argentina's German-speakers, which were a quarter-million strong, acted as the Reich's agent. Many Argentines of German descent voiced open support for Nazi Germany.

After World War II, under Juan Perón's administration, Argentina participated in establishing and facilitating secret escape routes out of Germany to South America for ex-SS officials. Former Nazi officials emigrated to United States, Russia and Argentina, among others, in order to prevent prosecution. Some of them lived in Argentina under their real names, but others clandestinely obtained new identities. Some well-known Nazis who emigrated to Argentina are Obersturmbannführer Adolf Eichmann, doctors Josef Mengele and Aribert Heim, Commander Erich Priebke, Commandant Eduard Roschmann and General Lieutenant Ludolf von Alvensleben.

== German impact on culture in Argentina ==
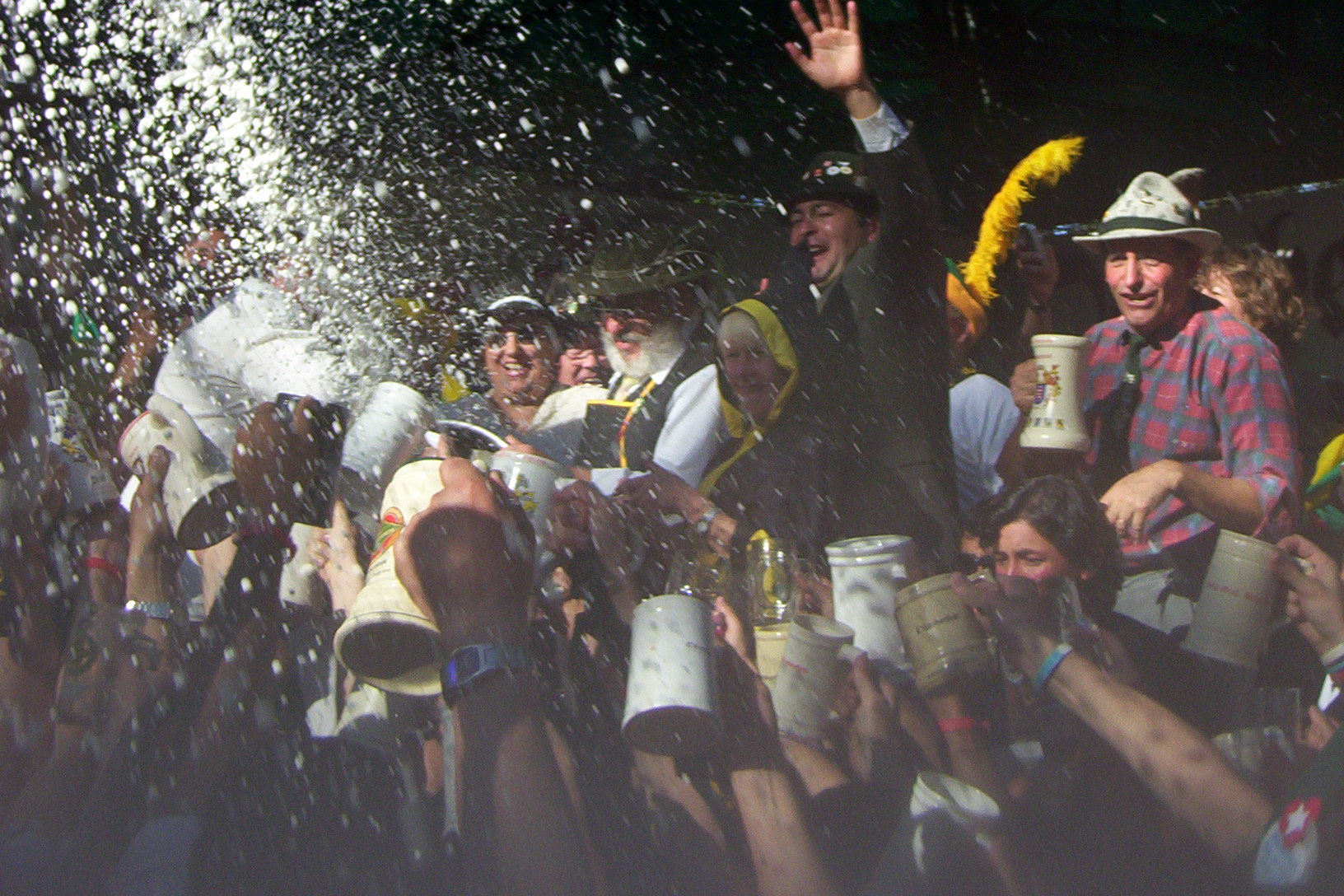
Oktoberfest in Villa General Belgrano.

=== Food ===
The influence of German culture has also influenced Argentine cuisine; the "Achtzig Schlag" cake, which was translated as Torta Ochenta Golpes in the country, can be found in some bakeries. In addition, dishes like chucrut (sauerkraut) and many different kinds of sausage-like bratwurst and others have also made it into mainstream Argentine cuisine.

=== Language ===
Today, most German Argentines do not speak German at home because of the decline of the language; however, some estimates suggest that 1.8 million Argentines of non-German descent have some knowledge of German. It is a language that can be heard all over the country, and this is partly maintained by the continued existence of German-speaking Argentines and some business connections. It is currently the fifth most spoken language in Argentina.

== German colonies in Argentina ==
This is not an exhaustive list.

=== Buenos Aires Province ===
- Colonia Hinojo (5 January 1878) - originally called Colonia Santa María and called "Kamenka" by the colonists (named after a Volga German village in Russia). It is situated in Olavarría Partido.
- Colonia Monte La Plata (1906) - mostly settled by Black Sea Germans.
- Colonia Nievas (1885) - called Hölzel by the colonists.
- Colonia San Miguel (3 October 1881) - called Dehler by settlers.
- Colonia Santa Rosa (1899).
- Colonia San Miguel Arcangel (1903).
- Coronel Suárez (1883).
- San José (1887) - called Dehler by the colonists and situated in Coronel Suárez Partido.
- Santa Trinidad (1887) - called Hildmann by the colonists and situated in Coronel Suárez Partido.
- Santa María (1887) - called Kamenka by the colonists and situated in Coronel Suárez Partido.
- Sierra de La Ventana (1908)
- Stroeder
- Tornquist (1883)
- Villa Gesell (1931)
- Verónica

=== Entre Ríos Province ===
- Crespo, Entre Ríos
- Colonia General Alvear (1878), includes the following 5 hamlets:

Aldea Valle María (Mariental)
Aldea Spatzenkutter
Aldea Salto (Kehler) or Santa Cruz
Aldea San Francisco (Pfeiffer)
Aldea Protestante

- Aldea Brasilera (1879)
- Aldea María Luisa (1883)
- Aldea San Juan (1889)
- Aldea San Antonio (1889)
- Aldea Santa Celia (1889)
- Aldea San Miguel (1899)
- Aldea Santa Anita (1900)
- Aldea San Isidro (1921)
- Villa Paranacito (1906)

=== Córdoba Province ===
- Colonia Santa María
- Colonia San José
- Colonia Eldorado
- Villa General Belgrano (1930)
- La Cumbrecita
- Villa Berna
- Villa Alpina
- Villa María (with Italian and English immigrants)
- Colonia Bismarck
- Colonia Bremen
- Corral de Bustos
- Silvio Pellico (with Italian immigrants)

=== La Pampa Province ===
- Colonia Santa María (1909)
- Alpachiri (1910)
- Colonia San José (1910)
- Colonia Barón (1915)
- Winifreda (1915)
- Colonia Santa Teresa (1921)

=== Chaco Province ===
- Juan José Castelli
- La Florida
- Coronel Du Graty

=== Santa Fe Province ===
- Colonia Esperanza (Swiss German)
- Colonia San Carlos (Swiss German)
- Colonia San Jerónimo/San Jerónimo Norte (Swiss German)
- Gödeken

=== Neuquén Province ===
- Villa La Angostura
- Villa Traful (1936)
- San Martín de los Andes (1898)

=== Río Negro Province ===
- San Carlos de Bariloche (1895)
- Puerto Blest
- Colonia Paso Flores
- Colonia Suiza (Swiss German)

=== Misiones Province ===
- Eldorado (1919)
- Puerto Rico (founded by Catholic ethnic Germans recorded as Brazilian citizens when came to Argentina)
- Montecarlo (founded by Protestant ethnic Germans recorded as Brazilians when came to Argentina)
- Comandante Andresito
- Oberá

=== Corrientes Province ===
- Colonia Liebig's (along with Polish and Ukrainian immigrants)
- Colonia Progreso
- Bonpland

== San Carlos de Bariloche ==
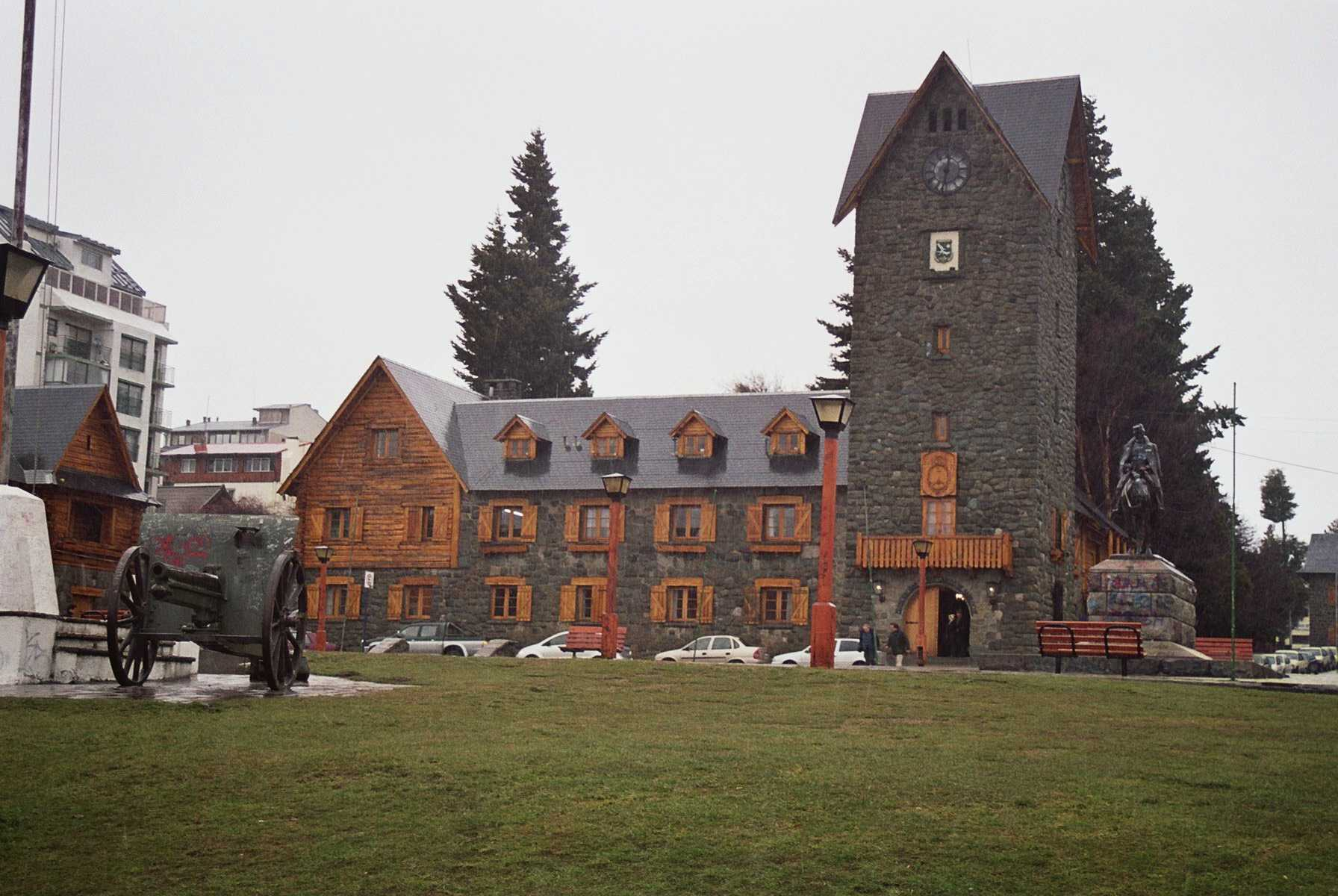
Architecture of San Carlos de Bariloche.

Like many cities settled by Germans, its development was greatly influenced by them and today the city has many examples of an architectural style brought by German, Swiss and Austrian immigrants. It was named after Carlos Weiderhold, a German Chilean from the city of Osorno who settled in the region, and the city has become one of Argentina's top tourist destinations.

== Figures ==
Yearly German immigration to Argentina from 1919 to 1932
Year	German immigrants	Total immigrants	% German immigrants
1919	1,992	41,299	4.8%
1920	4,798	87,032	5.5%
1921	4,113	98,086	4.2%
1922	6,514	129,263	5%
1923	10,138	195,063	5.2%
1924	10,238	159,939	6.4%
1925	4,933	125,366	2.9%
1926	5,112	135,011	3.8%
1927	5,165	161,548	3.4%
1928	4,165	129,047	3.2%
1929	4,581	140,086	3.3%
1930	5,171	135,403	3.8%
1931	3,045	64,922	4.7%
1932	2,089	37,626	5.5%
Total	72,054	1,639,691	4.4%

== Education ==
German schools:

- Deutsche Schule Temperley
- Deutsche Schule Villa Ballester
- Goethe-Schule Buenos Aires
- Pestalozzi-Schule Buenos Aires

Historic German schools:

- Hölters Schule
- Nordschule (Martinez)
- Deutsche Schule (Villa Adelina)
- Reuter-Schule (Buenos Aires)
- Rudolf-Steiner-Schule (Florida)
- Deutsche Schule Moreno
- Deutsche Schule Munro
- Gartenstadtschule — Colegio Ciudad Jardin (El Palomar)
- Deutsche Schule Eduardo L. Holmberg (Quilmes)
- Colegio Alemán "Steck" (Villa General Belgrano)
- Deutsche Schule Córdoba
- Johann-Gutenberg-Schule (Mar del Plata)

== Famous German Argentines ==
This is not an exhaustive list.

- Alberto Ammann Film and TV actor
- Roberto Arlt (short-story writer, novelist, and playwright)
- Fabián Assmann (football player)
- Christian Bach (actress)
- Osvaldo Bayer (writer and journalist)
- María Luisa Bemberg (Previous owner of Quilmes, film writer, director, and actress)
- Jorge Berendt (golf player)
- Elsa Bornemann (one of the most important Children's literature writers in Latin America)
- Juan Fernando Brügge (politician)
- Silvina Bullrich (writer)
- Patricia Bullrich (politician)
- Mario Bunge (philosopher and physicist)
- Tamara Bunke (communist revolutionary)
- Sergio Denis (singer-songwriter); his real name is Héctor Omar Hoffmann.
- Faustino Dettler (football player)
- Erich Eliskases (competitive chess player)
- Walter Eichorn (Hotel owner, Eden Hotel)
- Ida Eichorn (Hotel owner, Eden Hotel)
- Juan Esnáider (football player)
- Rodolfo Fischer (football player)
- Rodolfo Freude (close advisor of Argentine President Juan Perón and served as his Director of the Information Division)
- Matías Fritzler (football player)
- Adolfo Gaich (football player)
- Paolo Goltz (football player)
- Claudio Graf (football player)
- Gabriel Heinze (football player)
- Walter Herrmann (basketball player)
- Natty Hollmann (also known as Naty Petrosino, elected "International Woman of the Year"- 2006- by the Autonomous Region of Valle d'Aosta in Northern Italy, nominated for the Nobel Peace Prize 2009)
- René Houseman (football player)
- Juan José Imhoff (rugby player)
- Walter Kannemann (football player)
- Néstor Kirchner (former President of Argentina) and his sister Alicia Kirchner (minister, senator, and governor)
- Cristina Kirchner (former President of Argentina: Her mother, Ofelia Wilhelm, is of German descent)
- Máximo Kirchner (politician and son of Néstor Kirchner and Cristina Kirchner)
- Otto Krause (engineer and educator)
- Daniel Kroneberger (politician and National Senator of La Pampa)
- Lucas Licht (football player)
- Federico Lussenhoff (football player)
- Leonardo Mayer (tennis player)
- Victoria Mayer (volleyball player)
- Juan Carlos Mundin-Schaffter (actor)
- Nicole Neumann (fashion model)
- Mario Noremberg (football player)
- Héctor Germán Oesterheld (comic writer, considered the greatest South American to work in his field)
- Rogelio Pfirter (diplomat)
- Sebastian Prediger (football player)
- Erich Priebke (Former SS-officer, Bariloche)
- Robledo Puch (serial killer)
- Carlos Reutemann (former Formula One racing driver and politician)
- Friedrich Schickendantz (chemist and philosopher)
- Rodrigo Schlegel (football player)
- Jonathan Schunke (football player)
- Gabriel Schürrer (football player)
- Sebastian Spreng (visual artist, journalist)
- Damián Steinert (football player)
- Marcos Siebert (racing driver)
- René Strickler (actor)
- Martina Stoessel (actress, dancer, singer, model)
- Federico Sturzenegger (economist, President of the Central Bank)
- Silvia Süller (actress)
- Ernesto Tornquist (prominent manager, he founded the Tornquist Bank, the Tornquist city and Tornquist Partido in Buenos Aires Province among many other contributions)
- Marcelo Tubert (actor)
- Sergio Unrein (football player)
- Mariano Werner (car racer)
- Christian von Wernich (notorious Roman Catholic chaplain of the Buenos Aires Province Police during the Dirty War)
- Javier Weber (Handball player, bronze medalist Seoul '88)
- Alejandro Wiebe (TV host, nicknamed "Marley")
- Víctor Zimmermann (politician)
- Nieves Zuberbühler (reporter)
- Santiago Zurbriggen (football player)
- Marcos Kremer (rugby player)
- Josef Mengele, (Nazi officer, often dubbed the "Angel of Death")

== See also ==
- Argentina–Germany relations
- History of the Jews in Argentina
- Belgranodeutsch
- Mennonites in Argentina
- German inventors and discoverers
- Germans
- White Latin Americans
