= Cornelia Schmidt-Liermann =

Argentine lawyer and politician

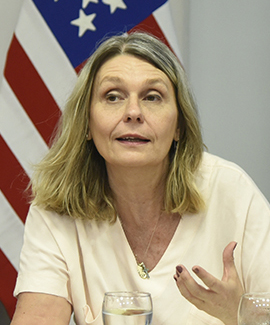

National Deputy
- In office 10 December 2011 – 10 December 2019
- Constituency: City of Buenos Aires

Personal details
- Born: 11 June 1963 (age 63) Buenos Aires, Argentina
- Party: Republican Proposal
- Other political affiliations: Juntos por el Cambio (2015–present)
- Education: University of Buenos Aires

Cornelia Schmidt-Liermann (born in Buenos Aires, 6 November 1963) is an Argentine lawyer and politician. A member of Republican Proposal (PRO), she was a National Deputy for the City of Buenos Aires from 2011 to 2019.

== Biography ==
She was born in Buenos Aires on 6 November 1963. She is a German Argentine. She obtained her Bachelor of Science and Letters from the Goethe-Institut in Buenos Aires. In addition to Spanish, she also speaks German and English.

In 1987 she graduated in law and as a procurator from the University of Buenos Aires. A year after this she followed with postgraduate courses at the University of Hamburg in the then Federal Republic of Germany, with a specialization in conflict of laws and new forms of commercial contracting.

== Publications ==
"Press conferences in Argentina. Current situation and alternative tools for the dialogue between journalists and government officials" (The Crujíadic, 2009)
