= Santa Teresa, La Pampa =

Santa Teresa
- Rural locality and village
- Location within Argentina
- Coordinates: 37°34′S 63°25′W
- Country: Argentina
- Province: La Pampa Province
- Department: Guatraché
- Time zone: UTC−3 (ART)

Santa Teresa is a village and rural locality (municipality) in La Pampa Province in Argentina.
