= Mennonites in Argentina =

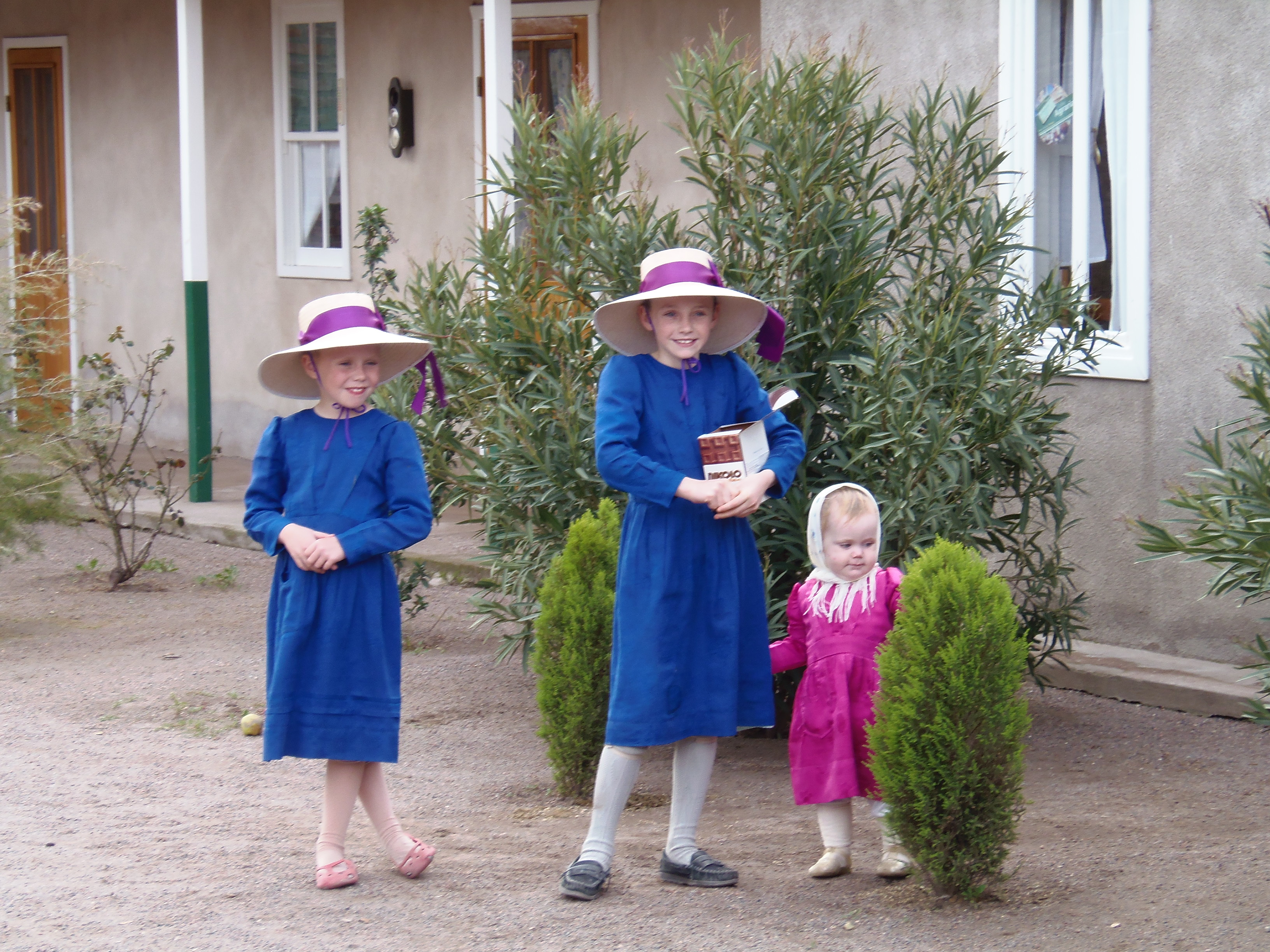
- Mennonite girls in the colony of Nueva Esperanza.

Total population
- 4,678 members (2012)

Regions with significant populations
- Mainly in the province of La Pampa; There are also other established communities in the provinces of Santiago del Estero and Buenos Aires

Religions
- Anabaptist

Scriptures
- The Bible

Languages
- Plautdietsch; Standard German; Spanish

Mennonites in Argentina belong to two quite different groups: conservative and very conservative Plautdietsch-speaking groups of Russian Mennonites who are descendants of Frisian, Flemish and Prussian people, and converts to the Mennonite faith from the general Argentinian population.

The Mennonites as a religious group can trace back their roots to 1525 CE, the time of the Protestant Reformation. They belonged to the radical wing of the Reformation who tried to base its faith only on the Bible as God's word and live according to it.

About one third of Mennonites in Argentina are conservative ethnic Mennonites who belong to the Altkolonier branch. These Russian Mennonites are the third largest community of Mennonites in South America, with six colonies in Argentina.

Russian Mennonites have their own language and customs and live in colonies. Conservative ethnic Mennonites normally do not engage in missionary activities but look for a quiet and remote place where they can live according to their tradition.

More liberal Mennonites are engaged in worldwide missionary work like other North American Protestant denominations. Converts to the Mennonite faith from these efforts normally live in cities and speak Spanish and do not differ much from other Protestants in Argentina.

== History and ethnicity ==
Most ethnic Mennonites have a long history of migrations. The ethnic Mennonites in Argentina are descendants of Vistula delta Mennonites, who migrated between 1789 and 1830 to a part of the Russian Empire that today belongs to Ukraine. From there they migrated to Canada in the 1870s and from there in 1922 to Mexico and in 1927 to Paraguay. A major migration of Mennonites to Argentina occurred from 1986 to 1987, mainly from Mexico, Uruguay and Paraguay.

Although from different countries, all are of the same Dutch-Prussian ethnic background which developed into an ethnic group in the Russian Empire. Therefore, they are often somewhat misleadingly called "Russian" Mennonites (German: Russland-Mennoniten). The mother tongue of these Mennonites is Plautdietsch, which is a Low German dialect.

== Mission and settlements in Argentina ==
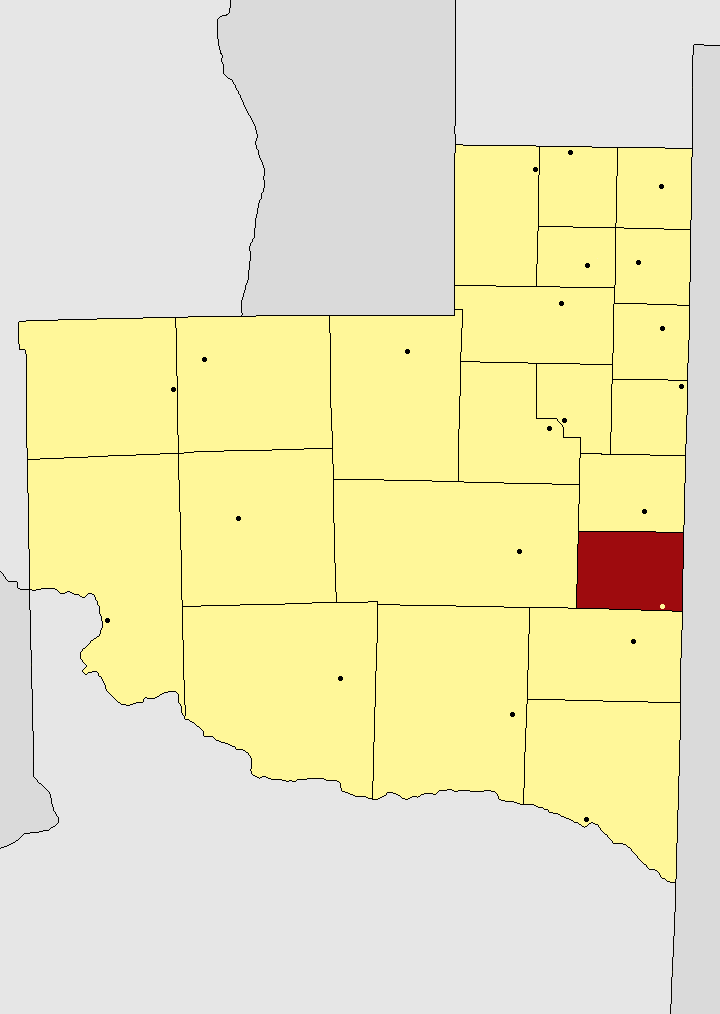
Guatraché Department highlighted in La Pampa Province.

North American Mennonite missionaries (Mennonite Church (MC)) started to work in Argentina in 1917. Work among Indians in the far north Chaco territory started in 1943. In 1953 there were 745 members in congregations founded by these missionaries.

In 1948 a first group of about 150 ethnic Mennonites from Russia heading for Paraguay stranded in Argentina. They settled mostly in Buenos Aires and assimilated more or less into the Argentinian society. Ethnic Mennonites from Paraguay joined them bringing their total number to about 400 in the mid-1950s.

In the year 1986 a group of very conservative ethnic Mennonites from Capulin colony, close to the city of Nuevo Casas Grandes in the northern parts of Chihuahua, Mexico, came to Argentina and founded "La Nueva Esperanza" colony 40 kilometres from Guatraché, La Pampa. A second colony of similar immigrants was founded near Pampa de los Guanacos, Santiago del Estero in 1995 by Mennonites from Durango, Mexico.

In 2004 settlers from "La Nueva Esperanza" colony near Guatraché founded "Colonia del Norte" near the city of Santiago del Estero. Both the settlement near Guatraché and the settlements in Santiago del Estero Province have around 10,000 hectares. In 2014 Old Colony Mennonites from Santa Rita Colony north of Cuauhtémoc in the Mexican state of Chihuahua founded a new colony of about 9,500 hectares 30 km far from Villa Mercedes, San Luis.

In 2019, a group of Mennonites from Chihuahua and Canada, bought 8,038 hectares (19,860 acres) of land near Arizona, Gobernador Dupuy Department, San Luis, 296 kilometres (184 mi) from the state capital, which will be 180 families (about 1,000 people). A 2020 survey found that there are more than 200 Mennonite colonies in nine Latin American countries, with 6 in Argentina.

Colony	Group	Province	Established	Origin	Membership (2021)	Hectare
La Nueva Esperanza	Old Colony Mennonites (Horse)	Guatraché Department, La Pampa	1986	El Capulín, Mexico	~1,400	~10,000
Pampa de los Guanacos	Old Colony Mennonites (Horse)	Copo Department, Santiago del Estero	1995	Durango, Mexico	~770	~10,000
Del Norte	Old Colony Mennonites (Horse)	Santiago del Estero	2004	La Nueva Esperanza, Argentina	~600	~13,700
Monte Verde	Old Colony Mennonites (Horse)	Santiago del Estero	2014	La Nueva Esperanza, Argentina	? (between 100 and 500)	~8,500
Santa Rita (Tupá)	Old Colony Mennonites (Car)	San Luis	2014	Santa Rita, Mexico	~360	9,540
Manitoba Sur	Old Colony Mennonites (Car)	San Luis	2019/2020	Manitoba, Mexico	~30 (planned for 180 families)	8,038
	Old Colony Mennonites (Horse)	Conesa, Rio Negro	2025	La Nueva Esperanza, Argentina		5,000

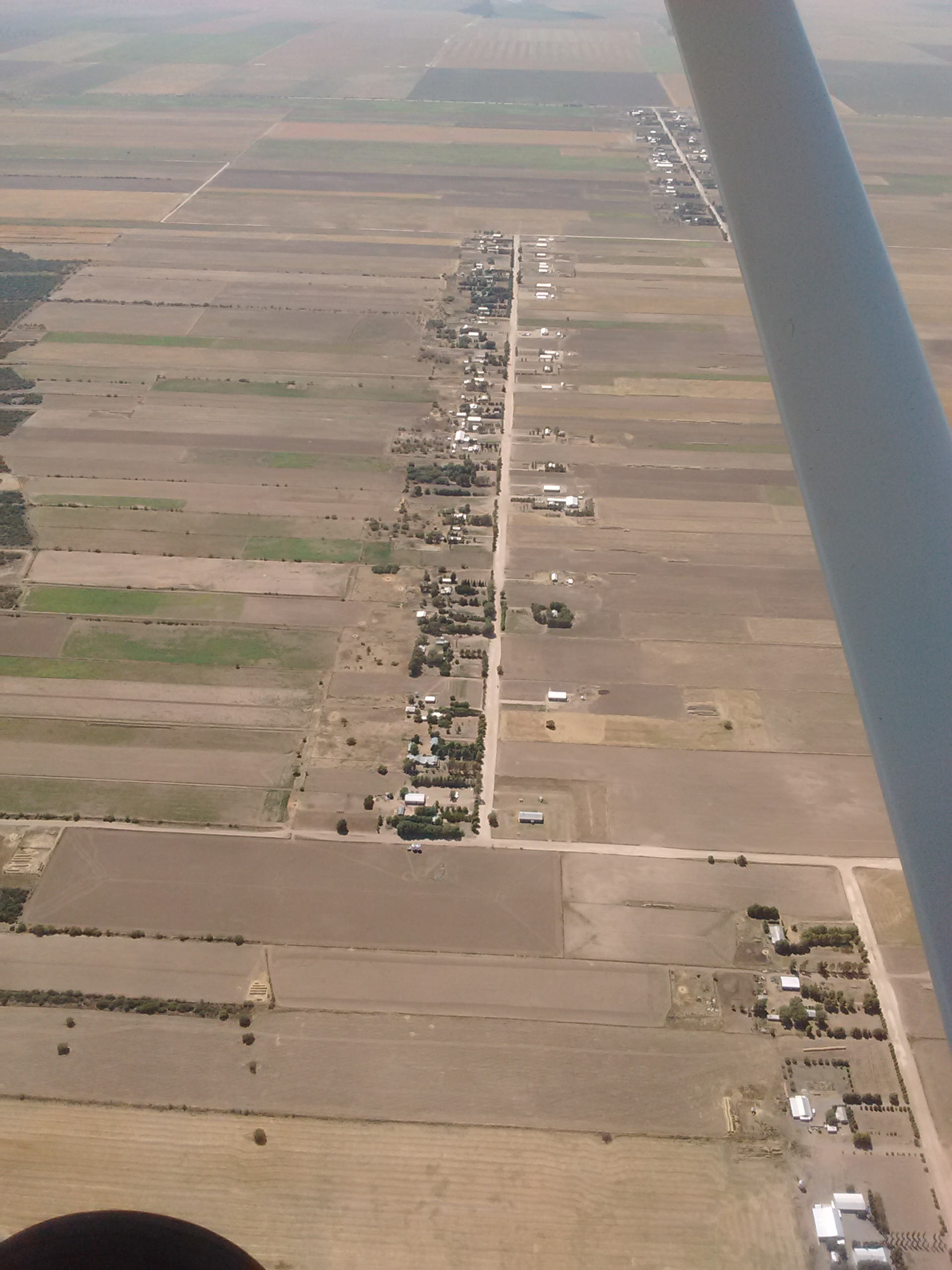
Aerial views of the colony Nueva Esperanza (New Hope)

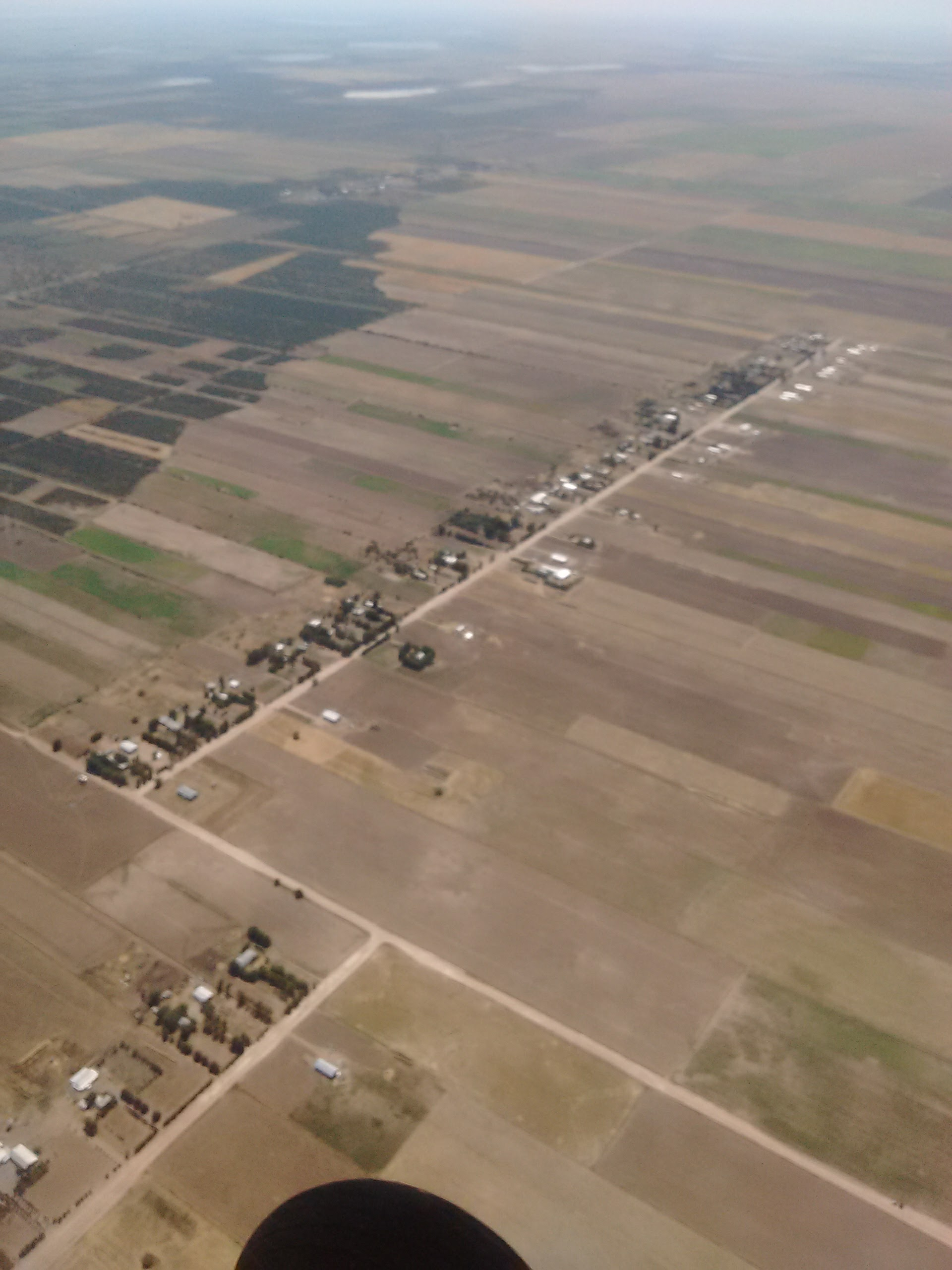

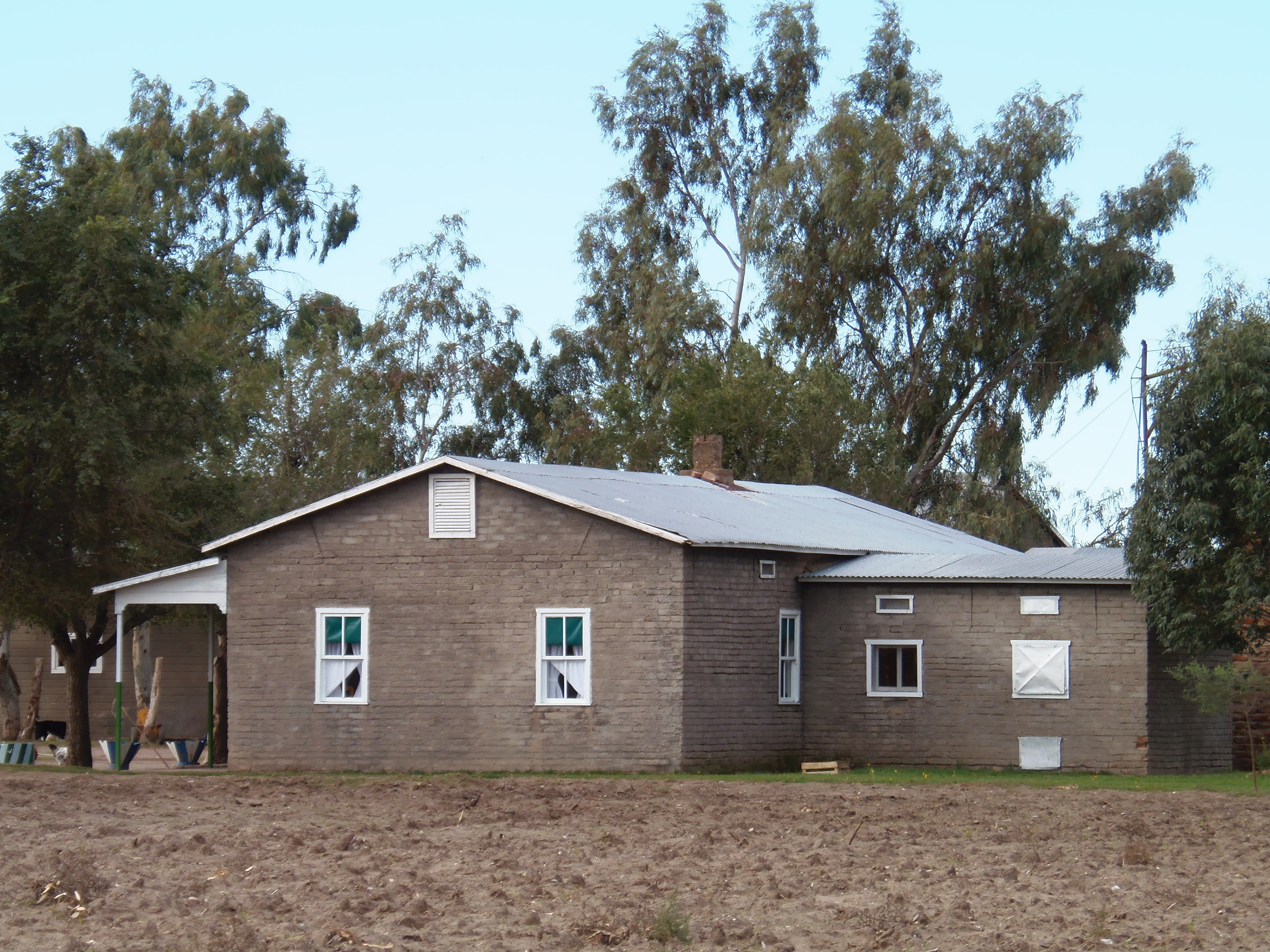
Mennonite home in the same colony

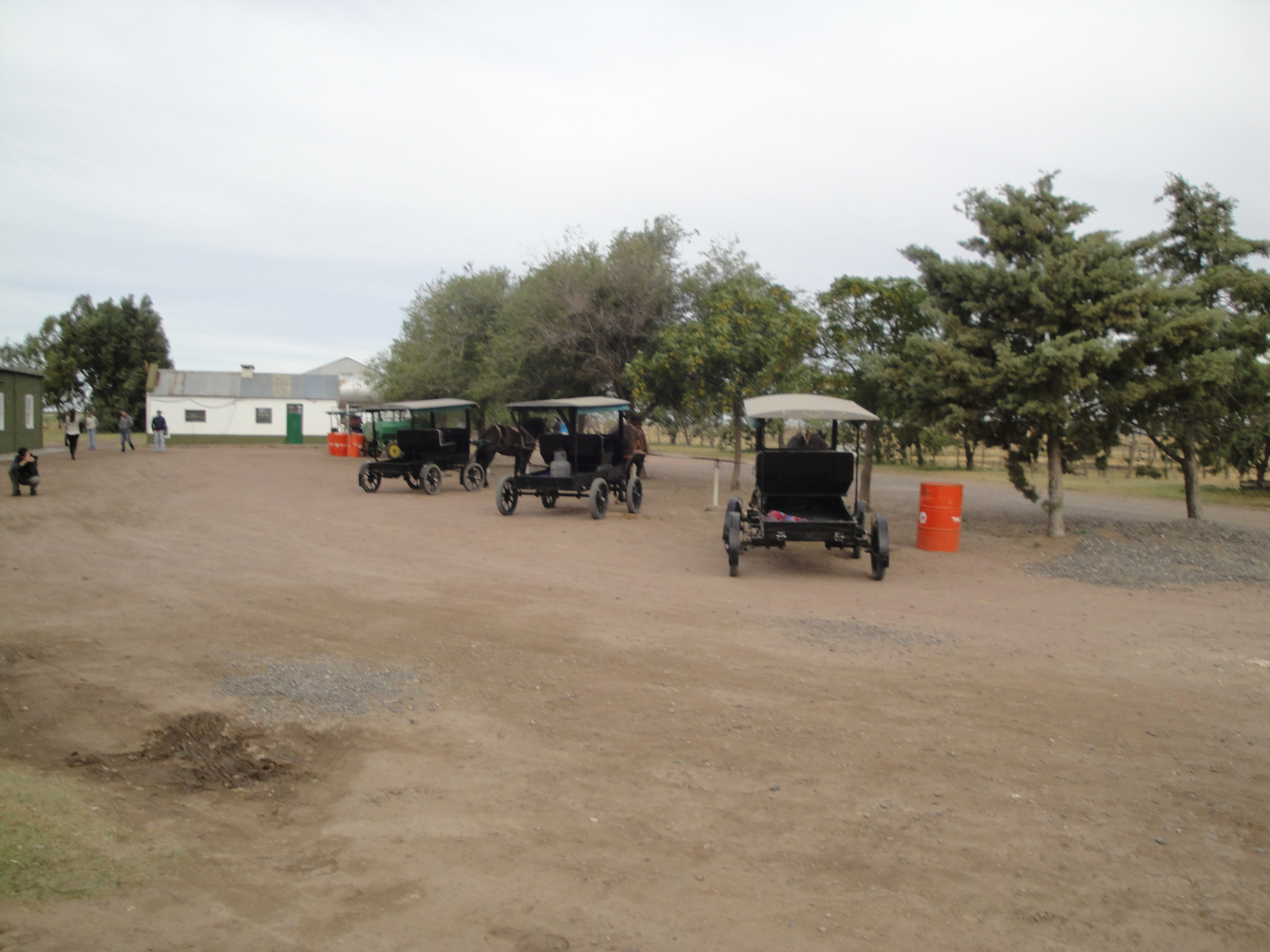

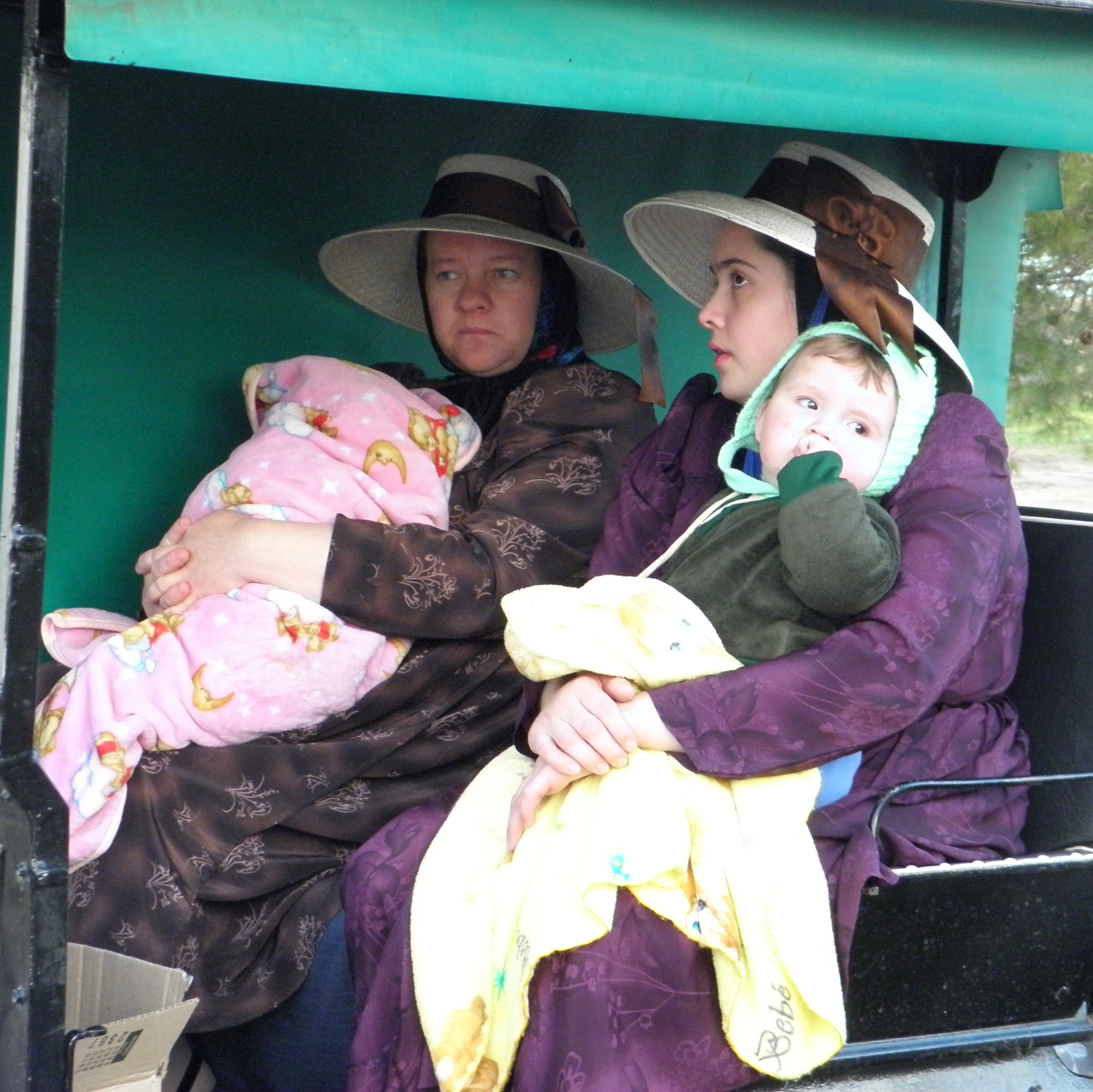
Mennonite women with their children in the same colony

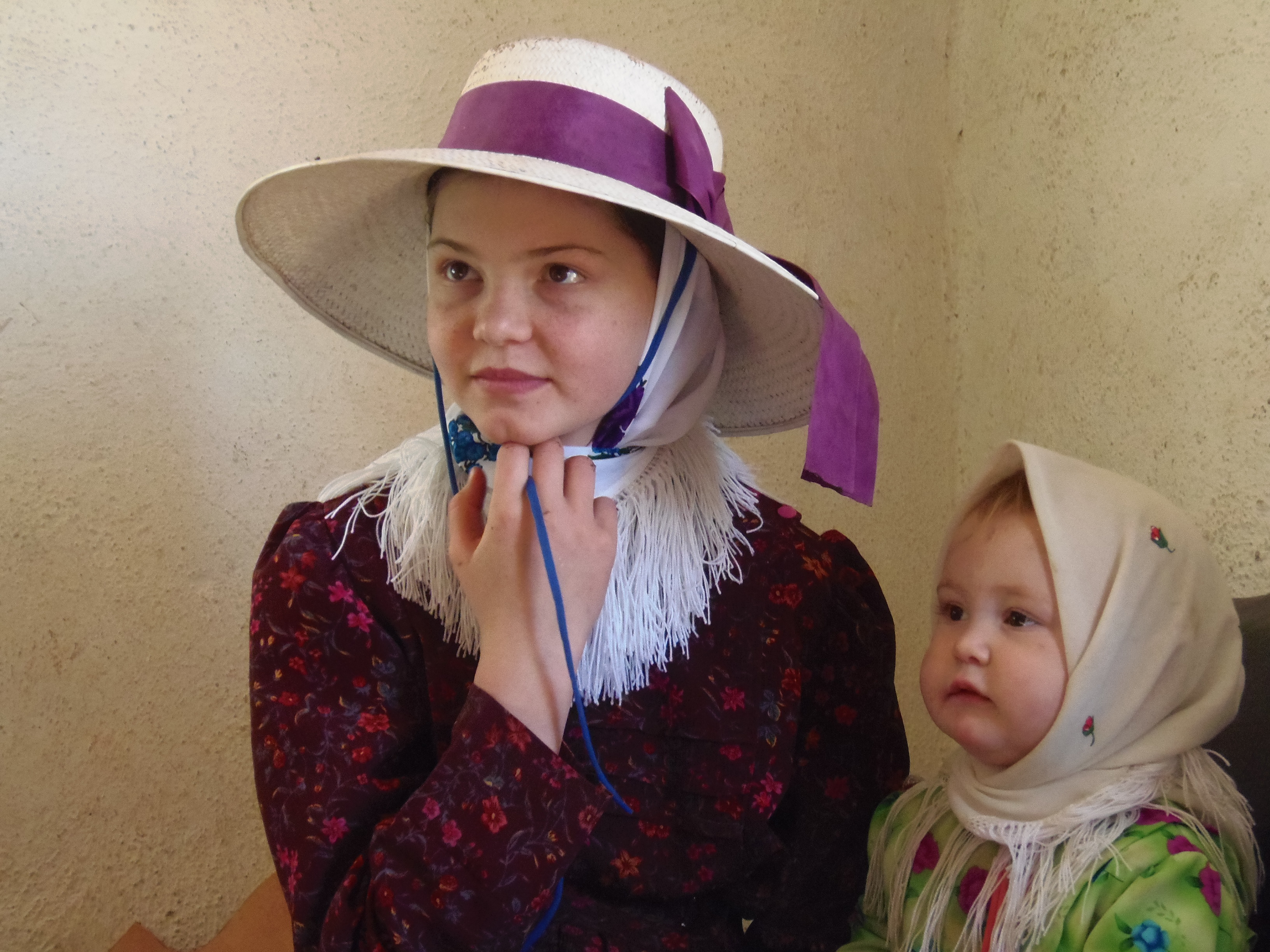
Mennonite kids

=== Populations ===
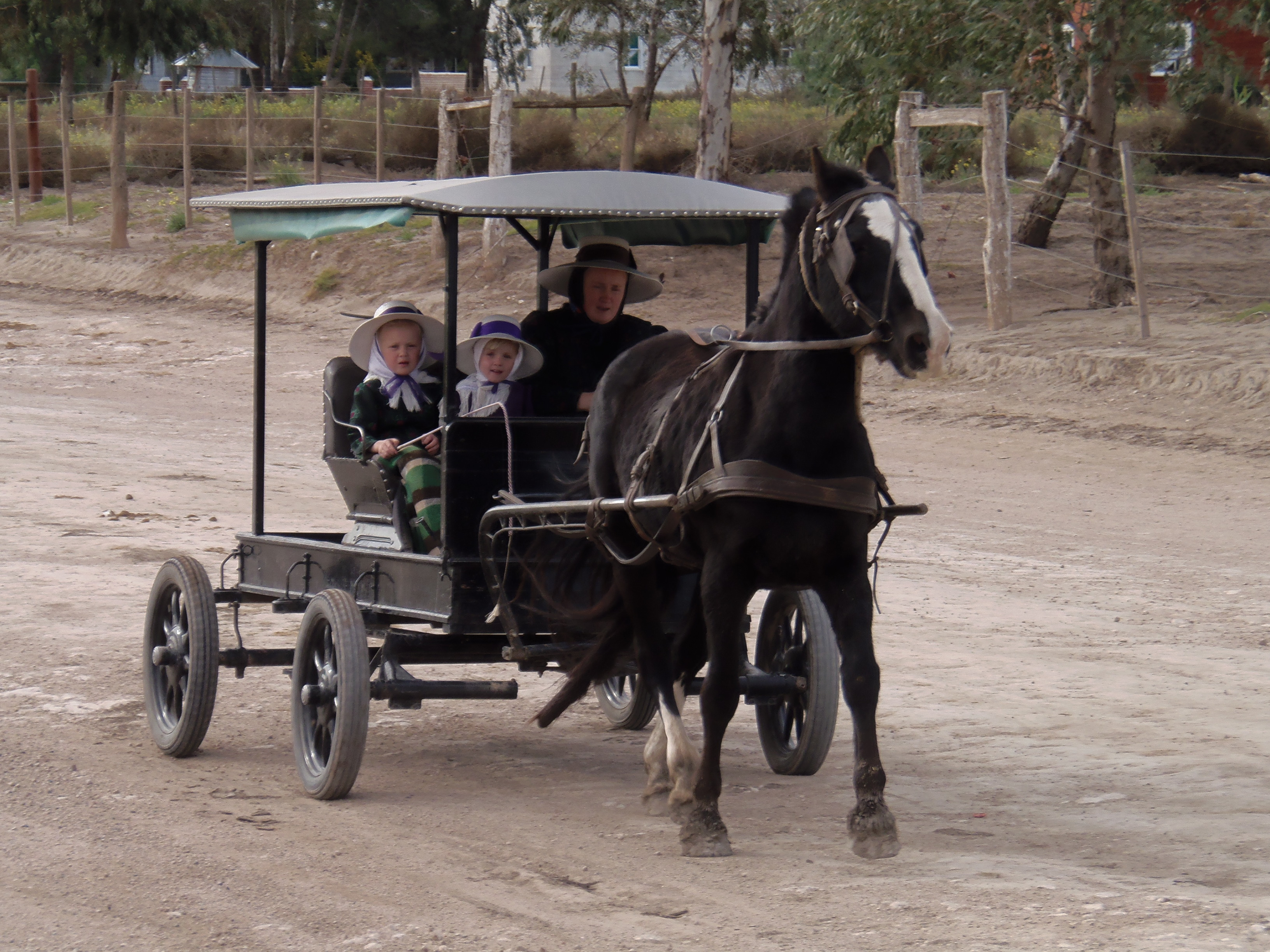
Horse and buggy in Argentina too, is a traditional type of transport among the Mennonites.

The number of adult members of the Mennonite faith in Argentina in 2012 was 4,678. Of these 1440 were members of Old Colony Mennonite congregations with a Germanic background, whereas the rest of 3,238 was mostly in Spanish-speaking congregations.

== Customs and beliefs ==
The ethnic Mennonites in their four colonies have been mostly engaged in tilling the land and live a simple life without electricity, cars, telephones, television, or other developments of modern life. They are distinguished by their plain clothes and their understanding of the Christian faith, which is very important to stay away from the world. Relations with the outside world are restricted to the purchase of raw materials and selling products.

== Languages ==
Ethnic Mennonites in Argentina speak Plautdietsch in everyday life and use an old-fashioned Standard German in reading, writing and singing. In addition, Spanish is spoken fluently by some settlers and taught in schools. By 2007, 1,300 people were surveyed in the town of Remecó, La Pampa, consisting of approximately 200 families, with an average of 8 to 12 children each. Converts to the Mennonite faith speak the language they spoke before their conversion, that is mostly Spanish.

== Labour and production ==
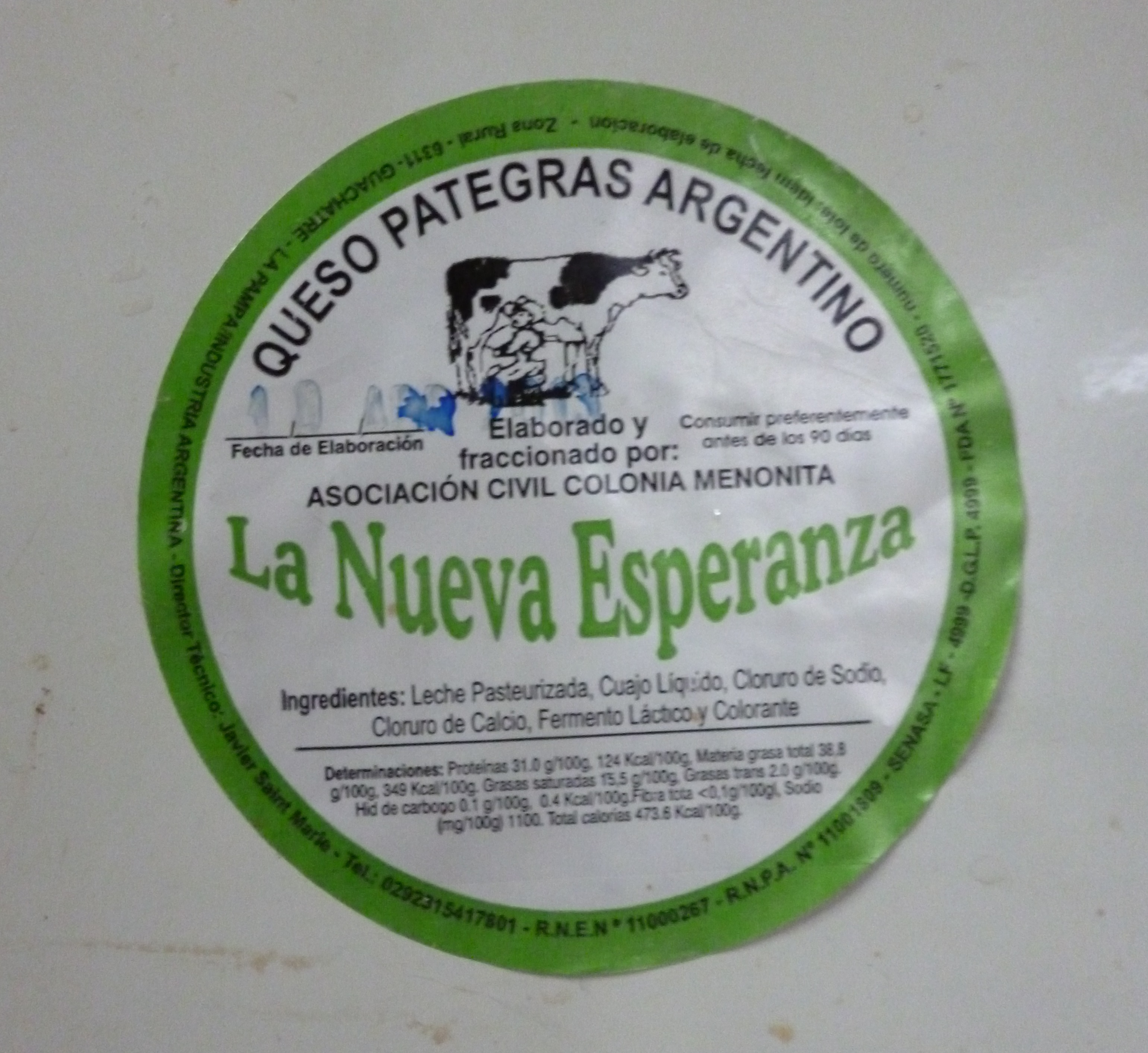
A wheel of cheese made by the Mennonites from La Nueva Esperanza.

The Mennonite colony "La Nueva Esperanza", in La Pampa, produces 15,000 litres (3,300 imp gal; 4,000 US gal) of milk per day and over 500 silos per year. They have about 5,000 head of cattle, and most families, a dairy farm. As well, grow potatoes, radish, cucumber, pumpkin, onion, pepper, carrot, sunflower, lettuce, cabbage, and cilantro; they raise poultry, pigs and horses. Through a civil partnership, they sell several products to the rest of Argentina, such as cheese, pasta with mozzarella, wheat, furniture, silos and other implements for agriculture.

== See also ==
- Immigration to Argentina
- Religion in Argentina
- German Argentine
- Mennonites in Belize
- Mennonites in Bolivia
- Mennonites in Colombia
- Mennonites in Mexico
- Mennonites in Paraguay
- Mennonites in Uruguay

== Literature ==
- Cañás Bottos, Lorenzo: Old Colony Mennonites in Argentina and Bolivia : Nation Making, Religious Conflict and Imagination of the Future. Leiden et al. 2008.
- Cañás Bottos, Lorenzo: Christenvolk: Historia y Etnografia de una Colonia Menonita. Buenos Aires 2005. (This Spanish language book is about Mennonites in Argentina)
