= Alpachiri =

Coordinates: 37°22′S 63°46′W

- Rural locality and village
- Interactive map of Alpachiri
- Country: Argentina
- Province: La Pampa
- Established: May 1, 1910

Government
  - Mayor: Rubén Müller

Population (2001)
  - Total: 1,797
- Time zone: UTC−3 (ART)
- Website: www.alpachiri.com

Alpachiri is a village and rural locality (municipality) in La Pampa Province in Argentina.

== Location ==
Alpachiri is located 50 km to the north-east of the city of Guatraché

== Population ==
Alpachiri had 1,797 inhabitants (INDEC, 2001), which represented a decrease of 3.3% from the 1,859 inhabitants recorded in the previous census (INDEC, 1991).
