= Eden Hotel =

Building in La Falda, Argentina

Coordinates: 31.0917°S 64.4672°W

Hotel Eden
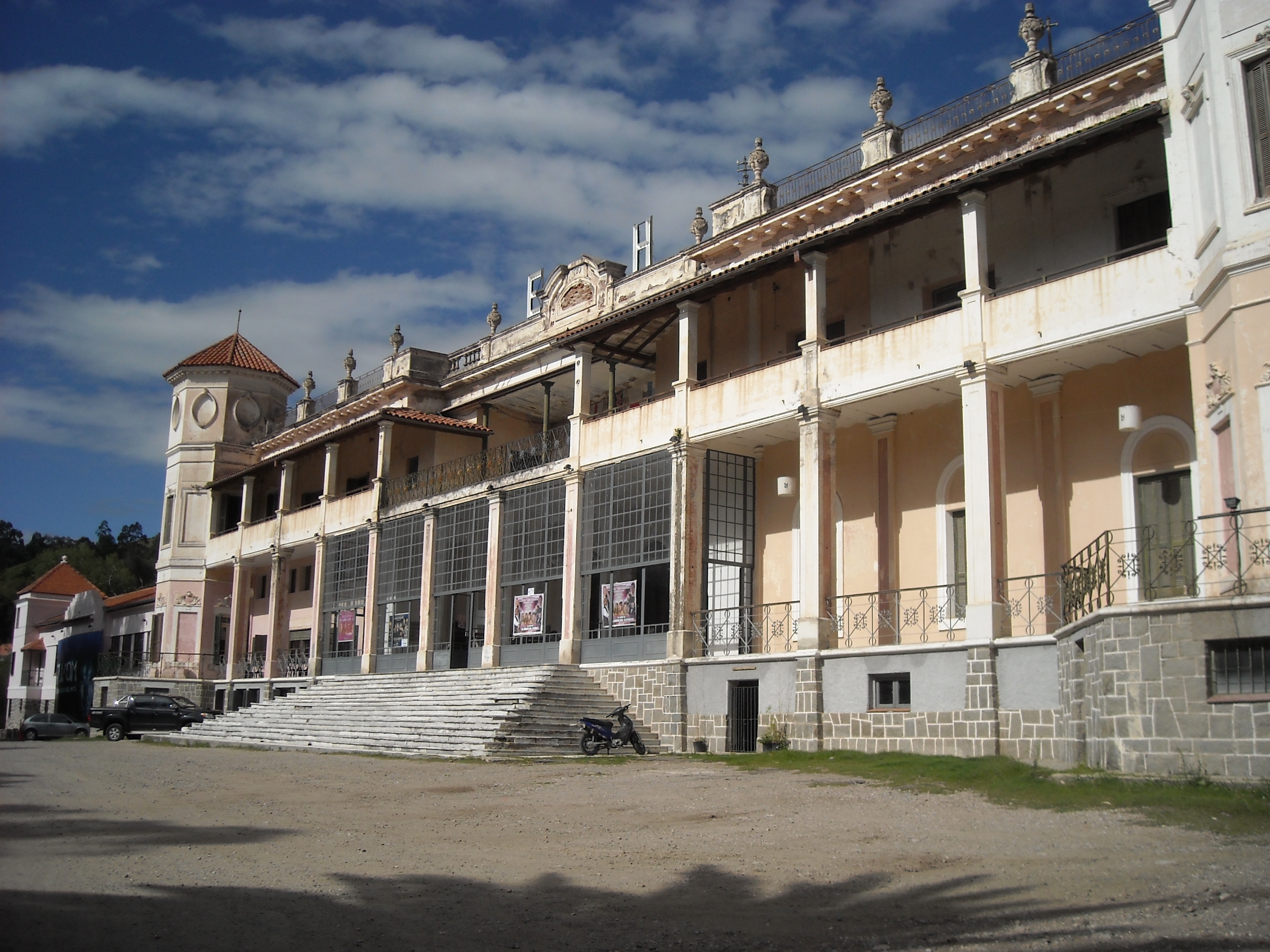
- The Eden Hotel in 2010, La Falda, Argentina
- Interactive map of the Hotel Eden area

General information
- Completed: 1879
- Owner: Walter and Ida Eichorn (1912 to 1960), La Falda municipality (1965 to present)

Website
- http://www.edenhotellafalda.com

The Eden Hotel also known as El Eden and The Eden is a former hotel and historic site located in La Falda, Argentina, in 45 km from Cabildo de Córdoba, one of the oldest colonial buildings still standing in South America.

== History ==
The hotel was built in 1897 by German army officer Roberto Bahlcke. Its main shareholders were Ernesto Tornquist, Juan Kurth, Roberto Bahlcke and María Herbert de Kräutner. In 1905, the shareholders decided to dissolve the company due to financial difficulties. The property later passed to Walter and Ida Eichhorn, members of the German-Argentine community and documented supporters of Adolf Hitler and the Nazi Party. In 1945, after Argentina declared war on Germany, the government seized the hotel as enemy property. After several failed attempts to reopen, the hotel finally closed in 1965 and was declared a National Historical Monument in 1988.

== Architecture ==
The Eden Hotel was designed in an eclectic European style combining French-inspired towers, German ornamental details, and imported materials. These features reflect the influence of European immigration on Argentine architecture at the turn of the 20th century. Its monumental scale and stylistic variety embodied the founders' ambition to establish La Falda as a high-end resort destination.

At its peak the building included two floors, large salons, 100 rooms, and only four bathrooms per floor; later renovations expanded to 38 bathrooms, a dining hall for 250, auxiliary dining for children and staff, a ballroom, reading room, two winter gardens, a bar, and balconies overlooking a park with imported trees.

== Tourism ==
Today the Eden Hotel functions as a cultural and tourist site. Visitors can tour restored sections of the building and view exhibitions that document its history, original furnishings, and photographic archives. Daytime tours focus on the hotel's historical role and architecture, while night tours emphasise myths, legends, and alleged paranormal phenomena.

=== Dark tourism ===
The Eden Hotel is frequently cited as an example of dark tourism, a form of travel centred on sites associated with death, decline, or mystery. Guided tours and promotional narratives often mix documented history with legends and unverified stories. A study by the National University of La Plata analysed how the hotel's narratives are framed to appeal to visitors interested in the darker aspects of heritage.

== In popular culture ==
=== Paranormal activity ===
The hotel is widely associated with ghost stories and supernatural legends in local folklore. One recurring tale is that of "Ana", a young girl said to haunt parts of the property. These stories have been incorporated into night tours and promotional materials that reinforce the hotel's image as mysterious and haunted.

=== Nazi theories ===
Some narratives and media portrayals have linked the Eden Hotel and its former owners to Nazi sympathies and German networks in Argentina during World War II. Historical documents and photographs indicate that members of the hotel's owning family had ties to German officials and sympathised with the regime; however, claims that Hitler faked his Berlin death and stayed at the hotel (e.g. in the History series Hunting Hitler) are unproven legends.
