= Martínez, Buenos Aires =

Martínez
- City
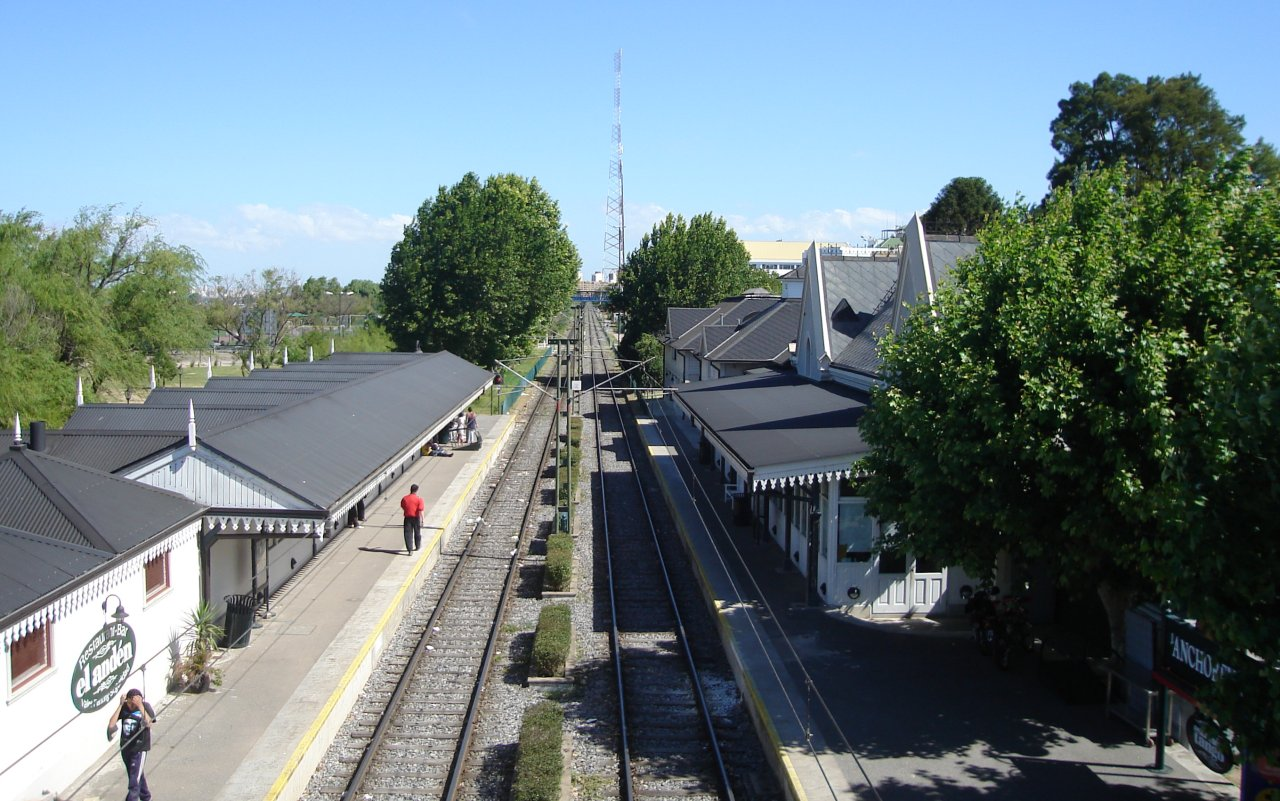
- Anchorena station (Tren de la Costa)

- Location in Greater Buenos Aires
- Coordinates: 34°29′S 58°30′W
- Country: Argentina
- Province: Buenos Aires
- Partido: San Isidro
- Established: November 18m, 1981

Government
  - Mayor: Ramón Lanús
- Elevation: 18 m (59 ft)

Population (2001 census [INDEC])
  - Total: 65,859
- Demonym: Martinense
- CPA Base: B 1640
- Area code: +54 11

Martínez is a city in San Isidro Partido, Buenos Aires Province. It is part of Greater Buenos Aires, and effectively a suburb of Buenos Aires. It is served by a commuter train service, the Tren Mitre, also the Tren de la Costa tourist railway line, and many buses.

Some areas of Martínez, especially near Avenida del Libertador, are relatively affluent. That area is considered rather safe. Unicenter is a major shopping centre. Some of the better-known cafés are Café Victoria and Café Martinez. A favoured street for shopping is Calle Alvear.

A UBA (Buenos Aires University) building is located in Martínez.

The Martinez local government has a recycling program.

Martínez is distinct from Villa Martínez de Hoz and Coronel Martínez de Hoz.

UN/LOCODE is ARMAR.

== Sport Clubs ==
- Club Vélez Sarsfield de Martínez
- Campo de Deportes N.º 4
- Club Banade
- Club 25 de Mayo
- Club "Pringles"
- Club "Estrella"
- Club "U.V.A.M"
- Club Atlético Pinito
- Club "La Amistad"
- Club "El Plata Tenis Club"
- Club Sociedad de Fomento Villa Primavera

== Education ==
Some of the schools located in Martínez are Colegio Naciones Unidas, Colegio Santa Teresa del Niño Jesús, and Polivalente de Arte de San Isidro.

The area once had a German school, Nordschule of the Nordschule und Goetheschule.
