= Guatraché Department =

Coordinates: 37.6642°S 63.5378°W

- Department
- Location of Guatraché Department within La Pampa Province
- Country: Argentina
- Province: La Pampa
- Capital: Guatraché

Area
  - Total: 3,525 km^{2} (1,361 sq mi)

Population (2022)
  - Total: 9,517
  - Density: 2.700/km^{2} (6.993/sq mi)
- Time zone: ART

Guatraché Department is a department of Argentina in La Pampa Province. The capital of the department is the city of Guatraché.

Historical population
Year	Pop.	±%
1991	9,425	—
2001	9,306	−1.3%
2010	8,831	−5.1%
2022	9,517	+7.8%
