= Legal procurator =

A legal procurator is a warranted legal professional in Malta, Argentina and some other countries, who assists advocates in lawsuits in courts of various levels. In Malta, a legal procurator also has rights of audience in lower courts of that country. The profession also existed until recently in Italy, until it was abrogated and all legal procurators were given the right to practise as advocates.
