= Paso Flores =

Coordinates: 40°35′S 70°38′W

- Municipality and village
- Interactive map of Paso Flores
- Country: Argentina
- Province: Río Negro Province
- Time zone: UTC−3 (ART)

Paso Flores is a village and municipality in Río Negro Province in Argentina.

== Climate ==
Climate data for Paso Flores, Río Negro
Month	Jan	Feb	Mar	Apr	May	Jun	Jul	Aug	Sep	Oct	Nov	Dec	Year
Record high °C (°F)	40.0 (104.0)	43.0 (109.4)	35.0 (95.0)	31.0 (87.8)	26.0 (78.8)	24.0 (75.2)	20.0 (68.0)	24.0 (75.2)	27.5 (81.5)	32.0 (89.6)	34.0 (93.2)	40.0 (104.0)	43.0 (109.4)
Mean daily maximum °C (°F)	26.6 (79.9)	27.1 (80.8)	23.9 (75.0)	18.6 (65.5)	13.1 (55.6)	9.1 (48.4)	9.5 (49.1)	11.8 (53.2)	15.4 (59.7)	18.8 (65.8)	22.2 (72.0)	25.3 (77.5)	18.5 (65.3)
Daily mean °C (°F)	18.0 (64.4)	18.1 (64.6)	15.2 (59.4)	10.6 (51.1)	6.6 (43.9)	3.4 (38.1)	3.2 (37.8)	4.8 (40.6)	7.8 (46.0)	10.6 (51.1)	14.0 (57.2)	16.8 (62.2)	10.8 (51.4)
Mean daily minimum °C (°F)	9.4 (48.9)	9.1 (48.4)	6.6 (43.9)	2.6 (36.7)	0.0 (32.0)	−2.4 (27.7)	−3.1 (26.4)	−2.1 (28.2)	0.2 (32.4)	2.5 (36.5)	5.7 (42.3)	8.3 (46.9)	3.1 (37.6)
Record low °C (°F)	−8.5 (16.7)	0.0 (32.0)	−3.5 (25.7)	−11.0 (12.2)	−15.0 (5.0)	−16.0 (3.2)	−13.0 (8.6)	−12.0 (10.4)	−10.0 (14.0)	−10.0 (14.0)	−7.5 (18.5)	−3.0 (26.6)	−16.0 (3.2)
Average precipitation mm (inches)	17.4 (0.69)	10.5 (0.41)	10.3 (0.41)	12.8 (0.50)	42.9 (1.69)	35.3 (1.39)	32.6 (1.28)	28.0 (1.10)	13.6 (0.54)	11.1 (0.44)	6.6 (0.26)	7.6 (0.30)	228.7 (9.00)
Average rainfall mm (inches)	17.4 (0.69)	10.5 (0.41)	10.3 (0.41)	12.8 (0.50)	42.7 (1.68)	33.3 (1.31)	31.9 (1.26)	27.6 (1.09)	13.1 (0.52)	11.1 (0.44)	6.6 (0.26)	7.6 (0.30)	224.9 (8.85)
Average snowfall cm (inches)	0.0 (0.0)	0.0 (0.0)	0.0 (0.0)	0.0 (0.0)	0.2 (0.1)	2.0 (0.8)	0.7 (0.3)	0.4 (0.2)	0.5 (0.2)	0.0 (0.0)	0.0 (0.0)	0.0 (0.0)	3.8 (1.5)
Average rainy days	2.4	3.3	2.9	3.7	9.3	8.0	7.3	5.3	4.0	3.7	3.7	2.3	55.9
Average snowy days	0.0	0.0	0.0	0.0	0.1	0.2	0.2	0.1	0.1	0.0	0.0	0.0	0.7
Source: Instituto Nacional de Tecnología Agropecuaria
