= Colonia Santa María =

Coordinates: 37°23′S 64°12′W

- Rural locality and village
- Interactive map of Colonia Santa María
- Country: Argentina
- Province: La Pampa Province
- Time zone: UTC−3 (ART)

Colonia Santa María is a village and rural locality (municipality) in La Pampa Province in Argentina.
