= Colonia Suiza =

Swiss Colony Colonia Suiza
- Town
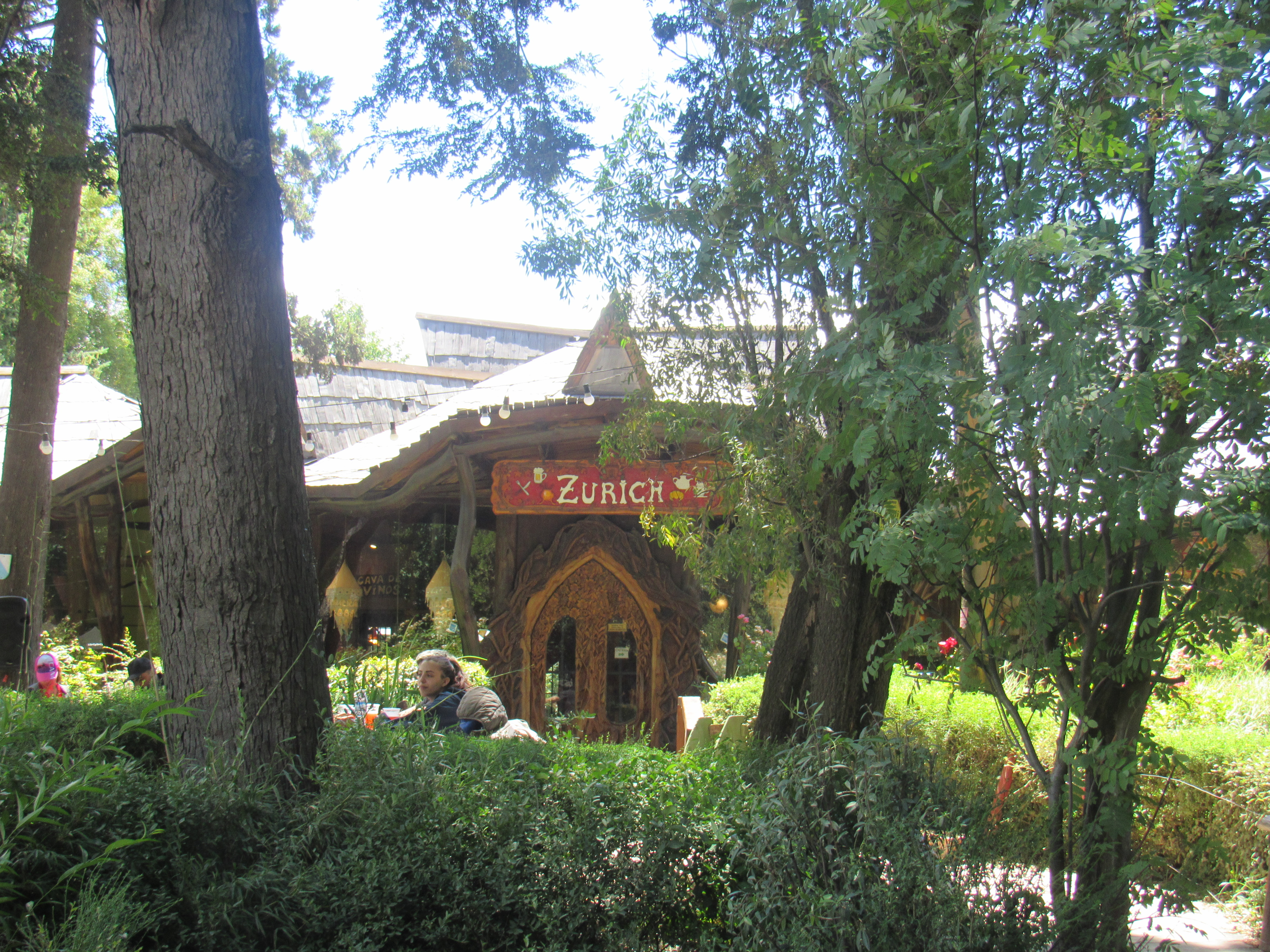
- Shops in Colonia Suiza

- Coordinates: 41.095°S 71.506111°W
- Country: Argentina
- Province: Río Negro (Argentina)
- Department: Bariloche

Population (2010)
  - Total: 150
- CPA: 8401
- Phone Prefix: 0294

Colonia Suiza (In English, Swiss Colony) is a town in the municipality of San Carlos de Bariloche, in the Bariloche Department, Río Negro, Argentina. It is located about 25 km from the city of San Carlos de Bariloche at the foot of Cerro López.

== History ==
The first population arrived in 1883, when Henriette Goye-Borgeat and Joseph Goye, along with four of their children emigrated to Argentina from Saxon, Canton of Valais, Switzerland

== Commercial activity ==
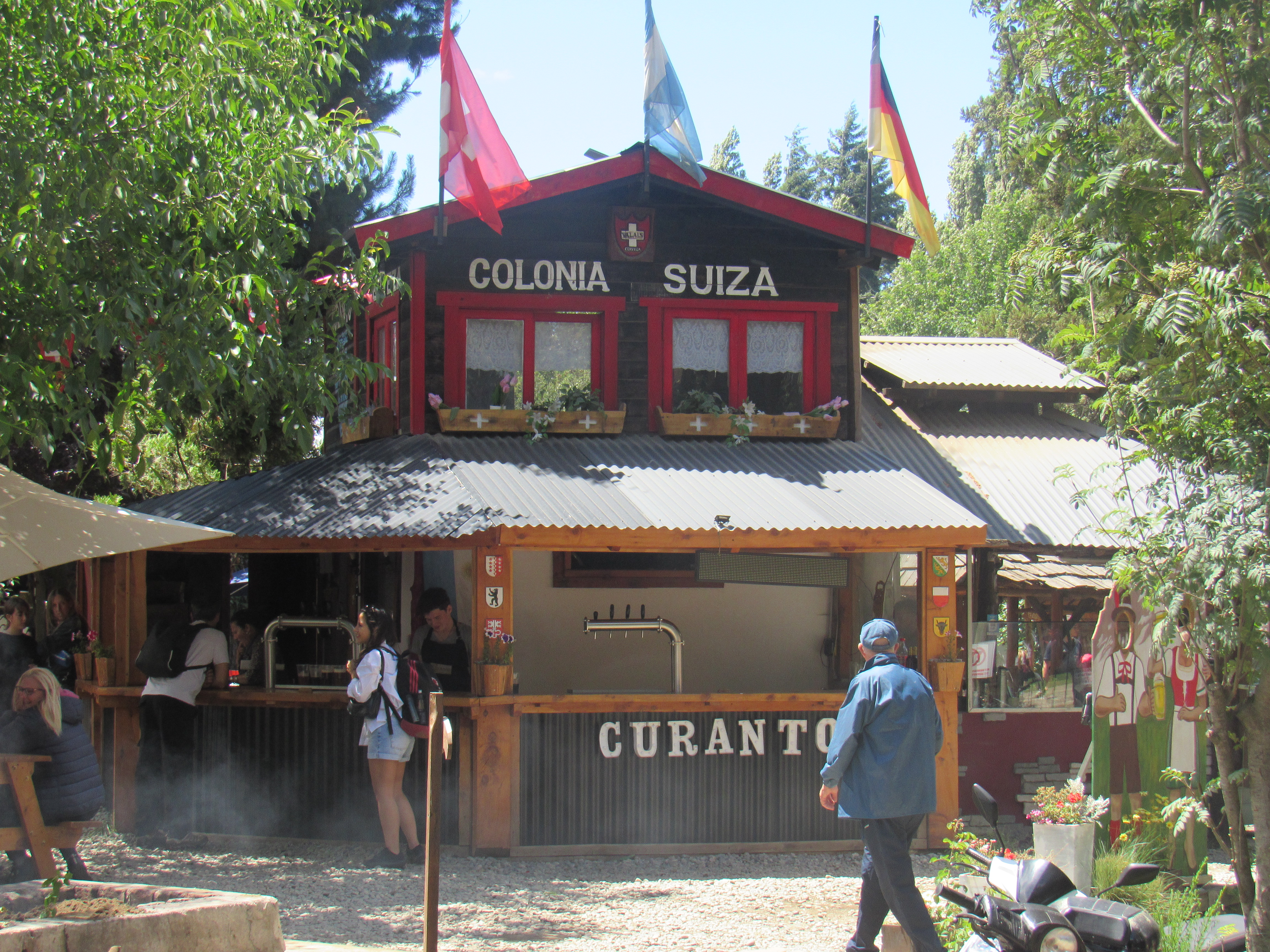
Regional Fair of Colonia Suiza.

It has places to spend the night and restaurants that offer services to tourists who visit the region. The preparation of a meal called curanto stands out, originating in the south of Chile and Argentina, in which the food is cooked in a hole dug in the ground, filled with hot stones. There is also exploitation of small crops of raspberries and fruits from cold climates.

== Population ==
It has increased to 150 in 2010 which represents an increase of 74% compared to the 86 of the previous census.
