= Goethe-Schule Buenos Aires =

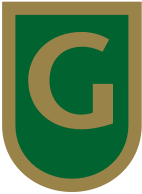

Location
- Reclus 2250 (B1609DQL) Boulogne, Buenos Aires, Argentina; Argentina
- Coordinates: 34.4813°S 58.5743°W

Information
- Type: Private school
- Website: goethe.edu.ar

The Goethe-Schule Buenos Aires belongs to the Goethe School Association, a nonprofit Civil Association that brings together the parents of students. Since it is a German School Abroad (DAS), it is sponsored by the Federal Republic of Germany. It is a recognized cultural exchange school that teaches and promotes the German language. It is located in the town of Boulogne, in the province of Buenos Aires, 20 km north of the center of the City of Buenos Aires and includes three levels: kindergarten, primary school (1st to 6th grade according to the German school system) and secondary school (7th to 12th grade according to the German school system). The school has more than 1500 students in the three levels. A fourth section of the school is the Humboldt Academy, an educational institution dedicated to teaching foreign languages, mainly German, where courses for adults and children are taught outside of the school’s regular classes.

== Cultural exchange ==
=== Degrees ===
As a cultural exchange school, Goethe-Schule contributes to supplementing and expanding the academic offer in Argentina by providing a German option. This means promoting the German language not only by teaching it, offering curricular courses in German and promoting the German culture, but also by offering students the possibility of obtaining a secondary school degree that is valid in Germany. This is what the Central Agency for Schools Abroad (ZfA) determined should be the work of the school in Argentina, and the school’s management and steering committee have adapted and applied these ideas to the circumstances and characteristics of Argentina.

The Goethe-Schule prepares its students for the German International Baccalaureate (DIA).In addition, three orientations are offered (natural or economic sciences or humanities), corresponding to those of the Argentinian Baccalaureate, from which students are required to choose after the 3rd year of secondary school (9th grade, according to the German educational system).Students who decide to study for the German International Baccalaureate must also meet the requirements for the Argentine Baccalaureate. Both degrees are obtained at the end of the 6th year of secondary school (12th grade, according to the German education system). “The German contribution consists, above all, of modern and effective language teaching, the demanding subjects taught in German and the promotion of German culture”. Therefore, after graduation, students are able to enter a higher technical school in Germany.

In addition, during their time at the school, students take exams to obtain the Deutsches Sprachdiplom (DSD) I and II in the 4th and 6th year of secondary school, respectively (10th and 12th grade, according to the German education system).Since the Goethe-Schule is defined as a trilingual school, classes are taught in three languages (German, Spanish and English) and, in addition to German exams, students take the Cambridge Certificate, so they also obtain international certificates in English. The school is currently considering offering students who do not speak Spanish as their mother tongue the possibility of obtaining the Diploma of Spanish as a Foreign Language (DELE), thus giving them the option of certifying their third language with an internationally recognized diploma.

=== Educational Concept ===
The Goethe-Schule is based on an educational model of openness and comprehensive education, instilling values such as respect and solidarity, tolerance and justice. The students, in their diversity, are the most important thing to the school and they are educated in critical thinking, with a sense of responsibility and independence. Comprehensive education is provided from the point of view of academic, artistic and sports training, which especially takes into account the bicultural identity of its students by providing courses in three languages (German, Spanish and English).The main projects on which Goethe-Schule works on all three levels, from kindergarten to graduation, are DIA 2029 (increasing the number of students with both the Argentine Baccalaureate and the German International Baccalaureate, promoting German learning at all levels), immersion (with the aim of introducing even more kindergarten students and students of the first three years of primary school to the German language), flexible learning (to provide a broad and comprehensive education that guides students in studying for their degrees and prepares them for the challenges of the 21st century) and the documentation of the learning process (so that both students and teachers can reflect on the learning process itself for its continued optimization).On the basis of these central projects, in addition to many other projects that are carried out at the school, the Goethe-Schule designs its strategic plan and its future in Latin America within the next 10 years.

=== Contact with Germany ===
The Goethe-Schule maintains close ties with Germany and aims to strengthen them. The first visit to Germany takes place in the 6th grade of primary school. At the children’s camp, students visit southern Germany for two weeks. In the framework of a two-month voluntary school exchange between the 4th and 5th year of secondary school (10th and 11th grade, according to the German educational system) and on a two-week trip in 6th year (12th grade, according to the German educational system), it offers students, among other things, the possibility of traveling to Germany to visit different universities and colleges. In addition, in order to support outstanding students, students in the 5th year of secondary school (11th grade, according to the German education system) are regularly invited to participate in the TU9-ING-Woche study week in Germany at one of the Technical universities that are part of the association of Technical Universities of Germany, TU9.Students in the 5th and 6th year of secondary school (11th and 12th grade, according to the German education system) are also offered the possibility of participating in the Deutsche Schüler Akademie, which is organized in different parts of Germany. Furthermore, the school organizes lectures by official representatives of colleges and universities, as well as German students and graduates who studied in Germany. Graduates have a broad network of contacts in many German cities.

=== Higher Education in Germany ===
Goethe-Schule students have different ways of entering German universities and colleges. Students who obtain the German International Baccalaureate (Abitur) degree have direct access to German colleges. Those who obtain the Argentine Baccalaureate diploma, take the Deutsches Sprachdiplom II (DSD II) international exam certifying level C1 and complete the Studienkolleg, a preparatory course that generally lasts a year, they can also study in Germany. The school also collaborates with the Studienkolleg in Mainz, which offers a five-month preparatory course, and with the University of Applied Sciences in Frankfurt. Another way of entering a German educational institution is to provide certification of a year of studies at an accredited Argentine university. Through the Professional Training Center in Buenos Aires (BBZ), students who obtain the Argentine Baccalaureate degree can also access vocational training, continue their training at a company and then complete undergraduate studies in Germany.

== More information ==
=== Notable Graduates ===
- Susana Moncayo von Hase (class of 1997): international soprano, soloist at the Colón Theater in Buenos Aires, the Scala of Milan, the Concertgebouw concert hall in Amsterdam, the Grand Teatre de Geneve and the Hebbel Theater in Berlin;
- Jorge Oscar Ramirez (class of 1978): Vice President of the Supervielle Group (Bank);
- Cornelia Schmidt-Liermann (class of 1981): lawyer, National Congresswoman for the City of Buenos Aires from 2011 to 2019;
- Corinne Wasmuht (class of 1981): visual artist in Germany, recipient of the Käthe-Kollwitz award in 2014;
- Rogelio Frigerio (class of 1987): economist and politician, National Minister of Interior, Public Works and Housing from 2015 to 2019;
- Demis Volpi (class of 2003): renowned choreographer and Argentine-German opera director, recipient of the Eril Bruhn Prize in 2011, Award for Best Work of the Year from the Circle of Art Critics of Chile in 2012 and the German Dance Prize (Deutscher Tanzpreis) in 2014.

=== Awards and Acknowledgments ===
==== German School Abroad of Educational Excellence ====
The Bund-Länder-Inspektion (BLI) inspection was carried out successfully at Goethe-Schule in two years and the last time, in 2017, the school obtained the “Excellent German School Abroad” seal of quality. This recognition means that the Goethe-Schule meets the extensive conditions required by the ZfA of all German schools abroad.

==== IHK Competition for German Schools Abroad ====
A group of Goethe-Schule Buenos Aires students conducted a critical study of the history of their school marked by National Socialism, and for their work they received the second prize in the 6th IHK competition for German Schools Abroad in 2017/2018.With an innovative approach and great commitment and courage, they filmed a bicultural documentary in two languages, with interviews with Argentinians and Germans. This method of studying and addressing such a sensitive historical topic has been inspiring for other German schools abroad.
