= Guatraché =

Coordinates: 37°40′S 63°32′W

- Town
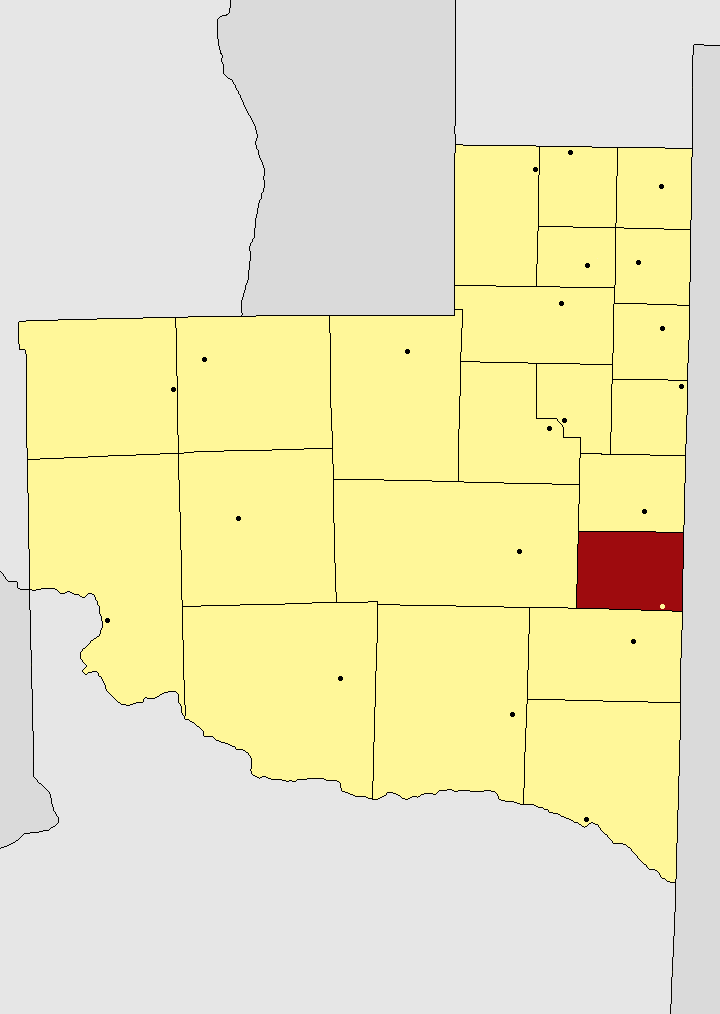
- Country: Argentina
- Province: La Pampa
- Department: Guatraché

Government
  - Municipal Intendent: Leonardo Schenkel

Population (2001)
  - Total: 5.271
- Time zone: UTC−3 (ART)
- Postal code: L6311
- Area code: 02924
- Website: www.guatrache.gov.ar

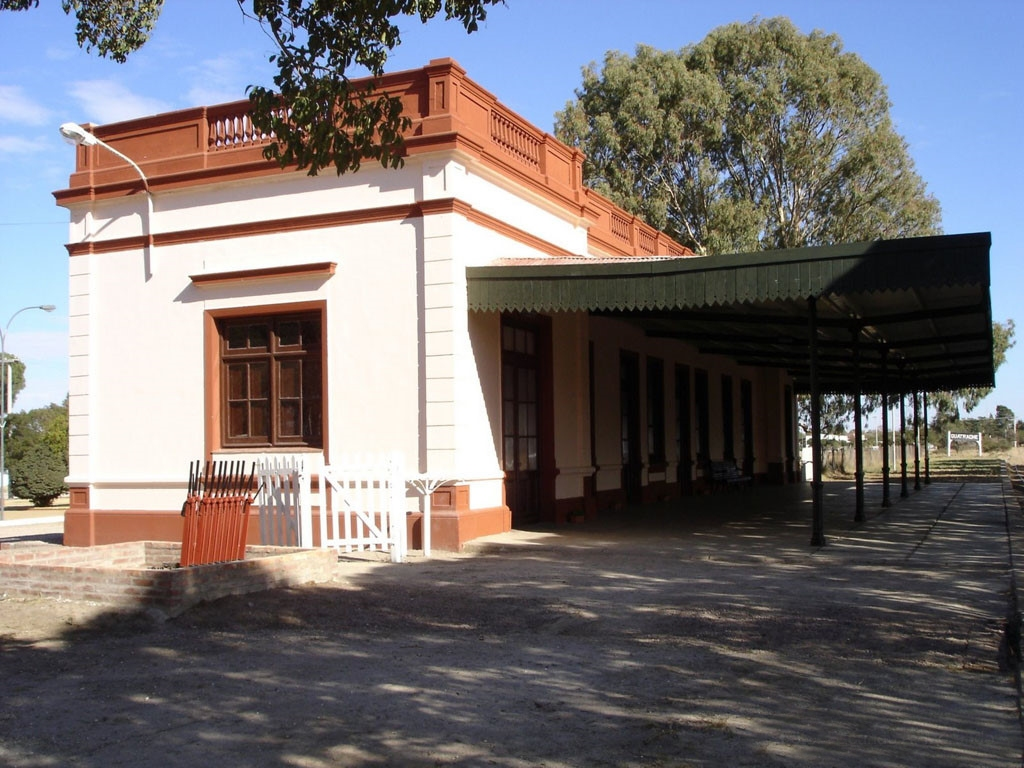
Railway station of Guatraché

Guatraché is a town in La Pampa Province in Argentina.

== History ==
Guatraché was officially founded on 19 April 1908 though a settlement already existed previously. The town was settled to the east of the actual settlement, in front of the old railroad station, and due to subsequent floods the town was moved to where nowadays stands. The list of surnames found in the town reveals the presence of immigrants coming from Spain, Italy, France and Germany, among other European countries. Natives also participated in the early days of the settlement; however, their real names were hidden under a creole names and surnames. Many of them came after being expelled in previous years by the militar campaigns while others came from distant places, joining the community as rural workers.

Guatraché is also home to one of the largest Mennonite communities in the country.

== Geography ==
=== Climate ===
Climate data for Guatraché, La Pampa (1941–1970)
Month	Jan	Feb	Mar	Apr	May	Jun	Jul	Aug	Sep	Oct	Nov	Dec	Year
Record high °C (°F)	44.7 (112.5)	43.5 (110.3)	40.6 (105.1)	36.0 (96.8)	30.5 (86.9)	24.5 (76.1)	24.0 (75.2)	29.7 (85.5)	32.8 (91.0)	35.7 (96.3)	40.1 (104.2)	42.5 (108.5)	44.7 (112.5)
Mean daily maximum °C (°F)	31.5 (88.7)	30.6 (87.1)	26.2 (79.2)	21.8 (71.2)	17.1 (62.8)	12.9 (55.2)	13.1 (55.6)	15.7 (60.3)	18.4 (65.1)	21.7 (71.1)	26.3 (79.3)	29.9 (85.8)	22.1 (71.8)
Daily mean °C (°F)	23.2 (73.8)	22.4 (72.3)	19.0 (66.2)	14.8 (58.6)	10.7 (51.3)	7.4 (45.3)	6.9 (44.4)	9.0 (48.2)	11.4 (52.5)	14.6 (58.3)	18.6 (65.5)	21.5 (70.7)	15.0 (59.0)
Mean daily minimum °C (°F)	14.6 (58.3)	13.7 (56.7)	11.3 (52.3)	7.3 (45.1)	4.6 (40.3)	2.2 (36.0)	1.1 (34.0)	2.0 (35.6)	4.0 (39.2)	6.9 (44.4)	10.7 (51.3)	13.1 (55.6)	7.6 (45.7)
Record low °C (°F)	2.8 (37.0)	1.7 (35.1)	−3.4 (25.9)	−4.3 (24.3)	−7.1 (19.2)	−11.0 (12.2)	−12.8 (9.0)	−11.2 (11.8)	−8.5 (16.7)	−3.9 (25.0)	−1.3 (29.7)	0.7 (33.3)	−12.8 (9.0)
Average precipitation mm (inches)	91.4 (3.60)	75.2 (2.96)	100.5 (3.96)	68.4 (2.69)	38.3 (1.51)	22.2 (0.87)	23.4 (0.92)	26.8 (1.06)	49.9 (1.96)	79.4 (3.13)	99.5 (3.92)	94.0 (3.70)	769.1 (30.28)
Average relative humidity (%)	47	51	62	67	74	80	76	66	63	64	59	50	63
Percentage possible sunshine	72	72	66	61	53	45	44	53	51	58	62	66	59
Source: Secretaria de Mineria
