= Gualeguay =

Gualeguay may refer to:

- Gualeguay, Entre Ríos
- Gualeguay Department
- Gualeguay River
