= Uruguay (disambiguation) =

Uruguay is a country in South America.

Uruguay may also refer to:

- Uruguay Department, an administrative subdivision of Entre Ríos Province, Argentina
- Uruguay Island, an island of the Wilhelm Archipelago, Antarctica
- Uruguay River, a river bordering Argentina, Brazil and Uruguay
- ARA Uruguay, a museum ship in Buenos Aires, Argentina
- Uruguay (Buenos Aires Metro), a metro station in Buenos Aires, Argentina
- Uruguay (Milan Metro), a metro station in Milan, Italy
- Uruguay national football team, Uruguay's national men's association football team
- Uruguay, a trace fossil of the ichnofamily Celliformidae
- ROU Uruguay, ships of the Uruguayan Navy

== See also ==
- Concepción del Uruguay, a city in Entre Ríos, Argentina
- Corbeta Uruguay, a former Argentine military outpost in the South Sandwich Islands
- Urugai, alternative name for Achar
