= Arroyo Urquiza =

Coordinates: 32°22′48″S 58°11′29″W

Location
- Country: Argentina

Arroyo Urquiza is a stream of 20.77 km located in Entre Ríos Province of Argentina. Belonging to the river basin of the Uruguay River, its entire course forms part of the boundary between the departments of Colón and Uruguay.

Formerly called Arroyo Largo, it received its current name in homage to the general Justo José de Urquiza, who was born in the riverside ranch of the Talar in 1801, belonging to his father Josef de Urquiza.

It is born from the junction of the streams of Achiras (of 11.83 km of course) and El Cordobés (of 10.75 km), to which it adds its waters the Arroyo El Pelado (of 9.71 km), its main tributary. Considering the tributaries of its upper basin, the total length of the stream is 36.56 km, ending at the Uruguay River in front of Almirón Grande Island and north of the city of Concepción del Uruguay.

Over the stream and at the height of the National Route 14, which crosses it, is the spa El Viejo Molino, named after the ruins of an old hydraulic mill built in 1884 by Swiss immigrants.
