= Materfer CMM 400-2 =

Argentine diesel multiple unit produced by Materfer

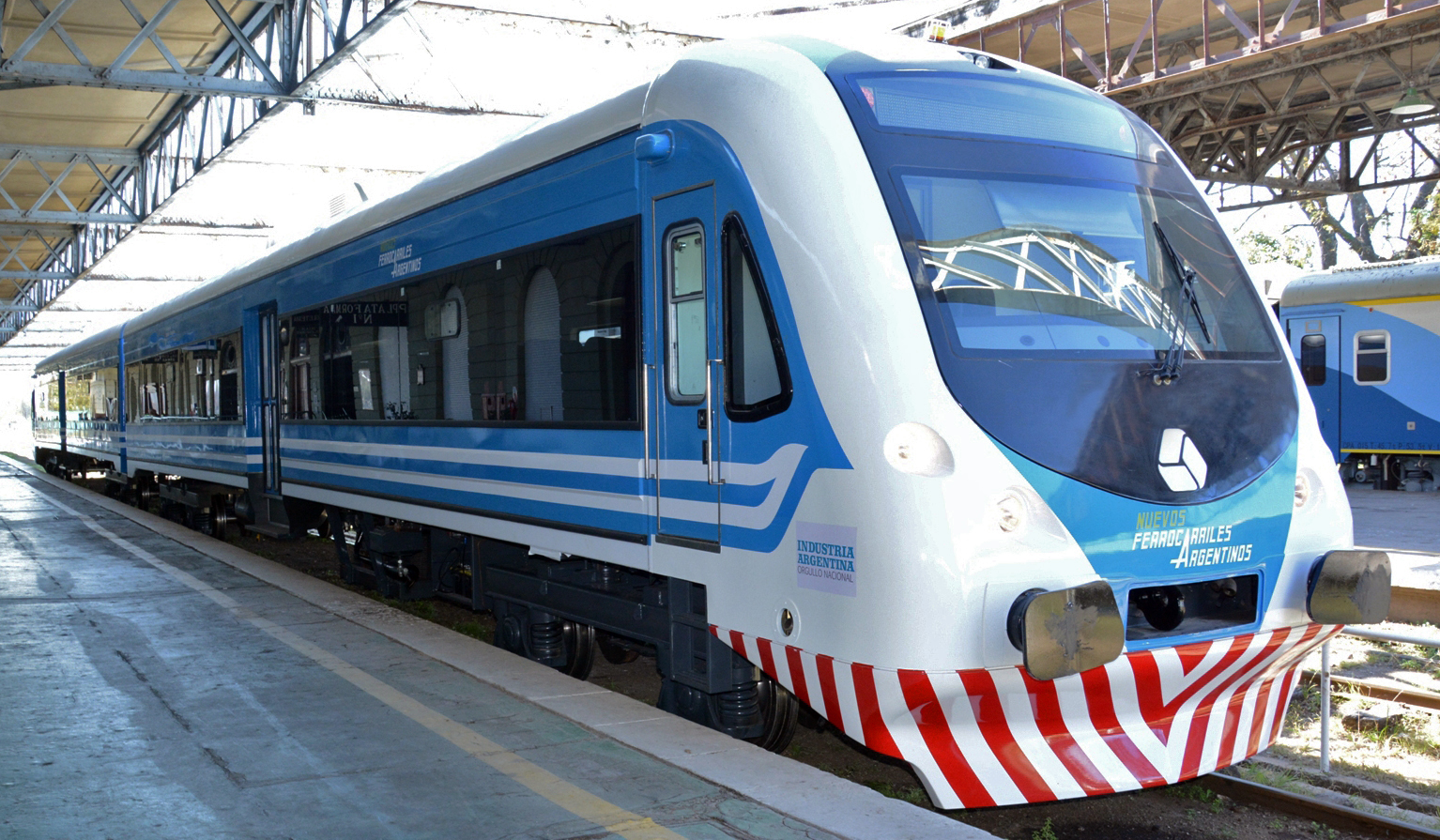
- A CMM 400-2 on Tren del Valle
- Manufacturer: Materfer
- Built at: Córdoba Province, Argentina
- Formation: 1-4 cars per trainset
- Capacity: 70 per car (seated)
- Operator: Trenes Argentinos
- Lines served: Mitre Line, Tren del Valle, Urquiza Railway, Belgrano Railway, Roca Railway

Specifications
- Car body construction: Stainless steel
- Doors: 1 per side
- Prime mover: Scania (400 hp)
- Transmission: Hydrodynamic
- Power supply: Allison (500 hp)
- Bogies: Materfer
- Track gauge: 1,435 mm (4 ft 8 1/2 in), 1,676 mm (5 ft 6 in), 1,000 mm (3 ft 3 3/8 in)

The CMM 400-2 is a diesel multiple unit produced by Materfer in Córdoba Province, Argentina. The units are produced in Argentina's three primary track gauges and the standard gauge variants were the first to be produced for General Urquiza Railway services in Entre Ríos Province.

== Overview ==
The DMUs come in 1000mm, 1435mm and 1676mm track gauges, and can thus be used on any part of the network with the exception of a few tourist services. Most components are built in Argentina, with the exception of a few such as its German Knorr Bremse brakes and Swedish Scania engines. The possibility of upgrading the Scania engines to more powerful Deutz AG engines on all future and existing rolling stock is being considered.

Some of the passenger comforts in the cars include air conditioning, pneumatic suspension, reclining seats, and LED lighting. Each car has a capacity for 70 seated passengers, and each trainset has a conductor's cabin on each side.

== Usage ==
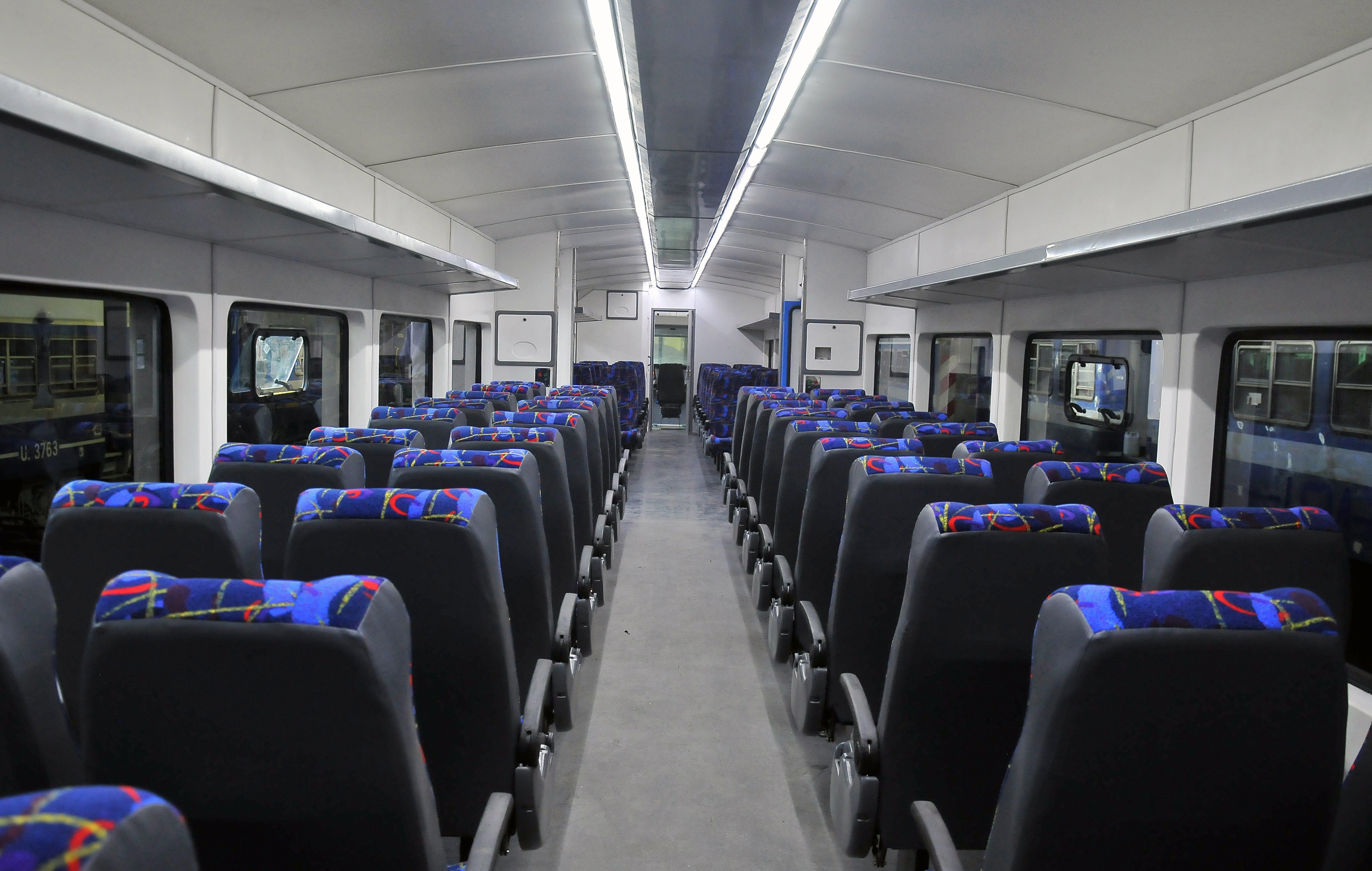
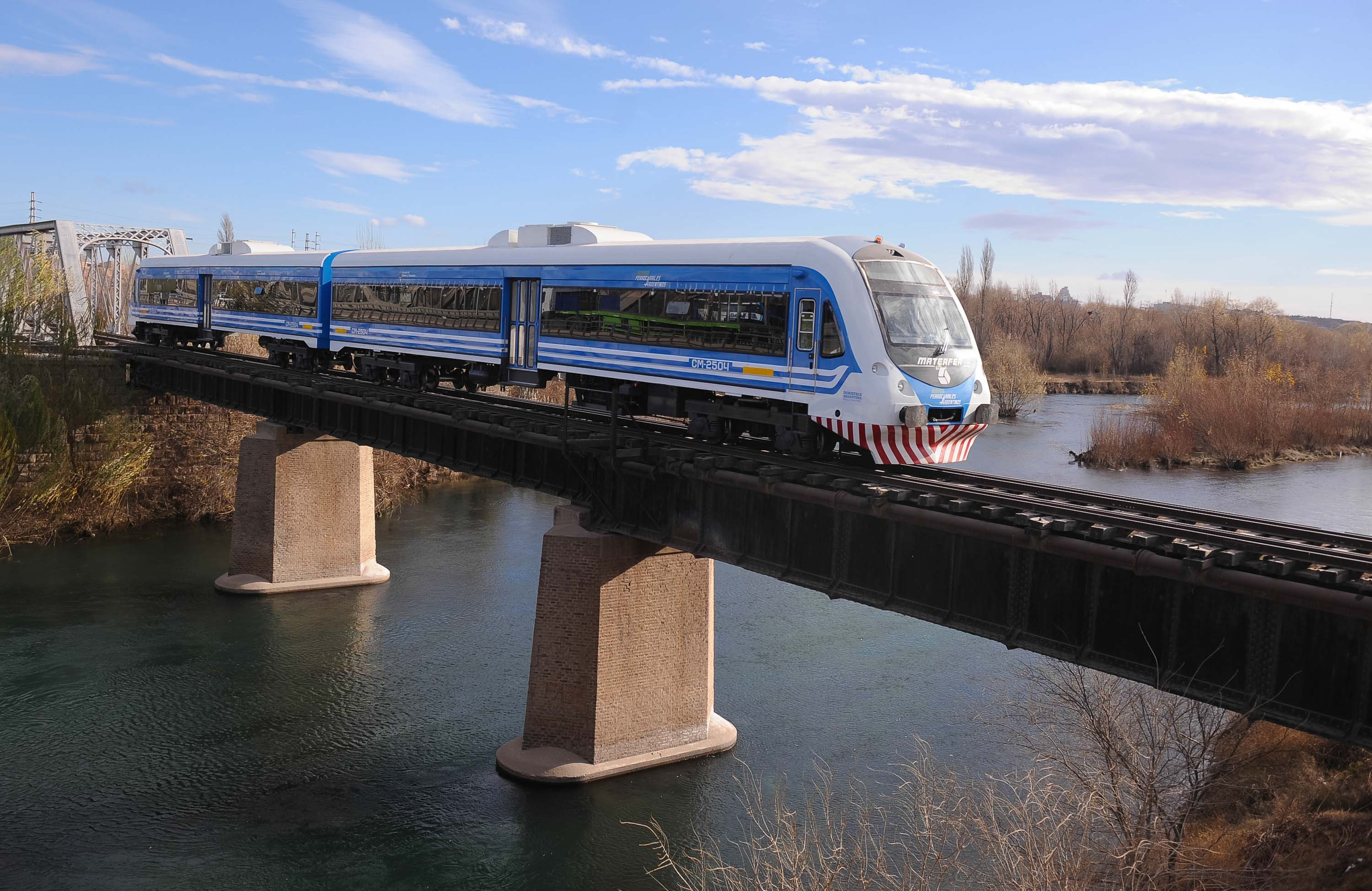
(Left): interior of a CMM 400-2; (right): Tren del Valle unit crossing the Neuquén-Cipolletti bridges

The units can be found on a variety of different urban and inter-urban services in Argentina. The first trainsets were sent to Entre Ríos Province for inter-urban services on the General Urquiza Railway's Paraná - Concepción del Uruguay line.

The units on the General Roca Railway are used for inter-urban services between Bragado - Realicó - General Pico in Buenos Aires and La Pampa provinces.

CMM 400-2 trainsets on the Mitre Line were used for its diesel branch between Victoria and Capilla del Señor. These units had serious problems when they were incorporated into this branch since the tracks had not been replaced beforehand, and the poor condition of the tracks led to mechanical failures. Therefore, the CMM 400-2 units were reassigned for them to be used for the Tren del Valle, which became the most successful train branch in the country since it opened in 2015.

In 2015 the first narrow gauge units began to arrive in Chaco Province to begin operating on a General Belgrano Railway branch whose tracks were completely replaced in order to run freight and passenger services along the entire width of the province. Their bodywork has a slightly different appearance from the standard and broad gauge units found on other lines.

== See also ==
- Materfer
- Emepa Alerce - another Argentine-built DMU
