= Materfer =

Argentine rolling stock manufacturer

Materfer S.A.

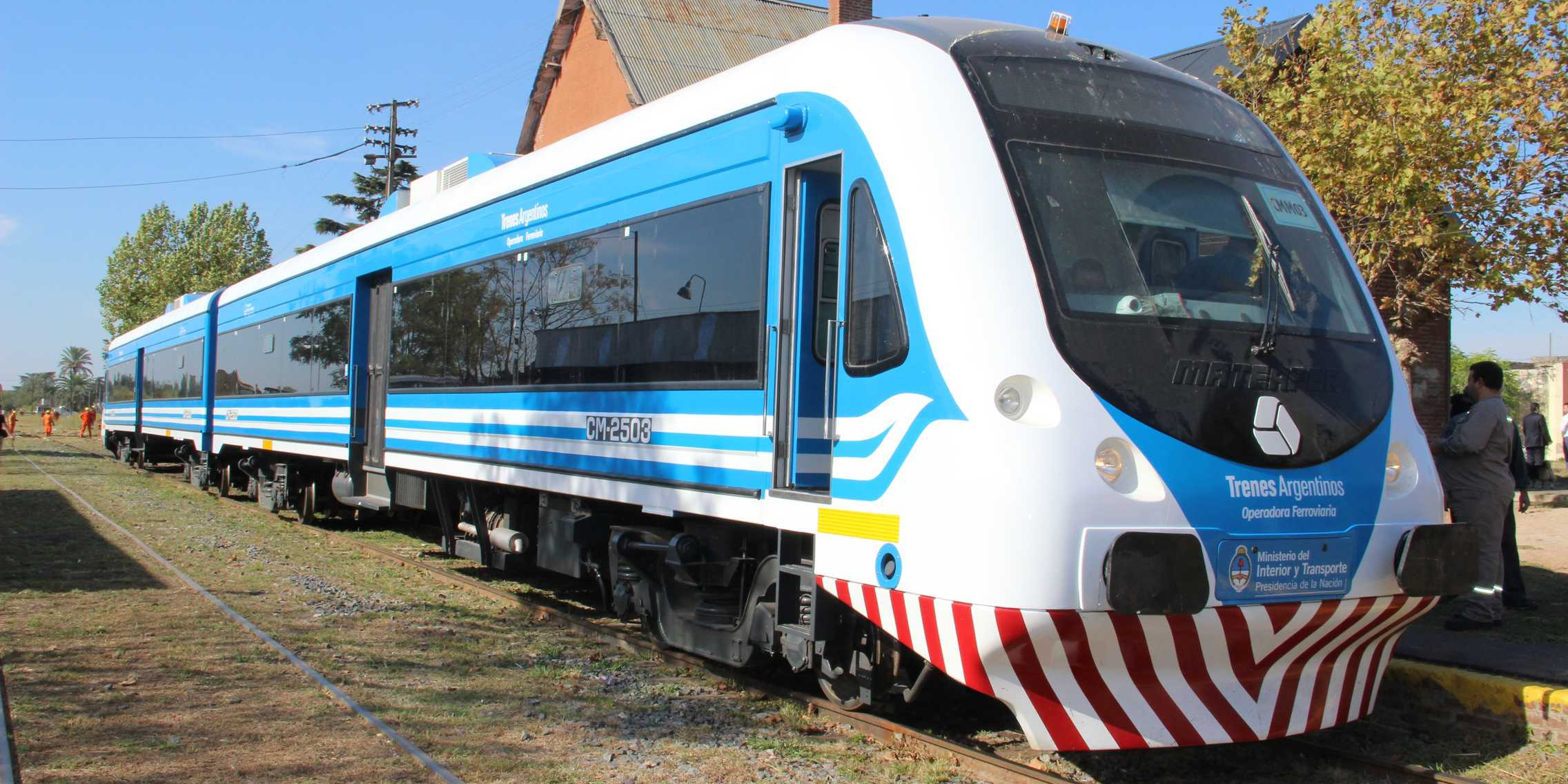
- CMM 400-2 railcar on the Mitre Line
- Company type: S.A.
- Industry: Transport
- Founded: 1958; 68 years ago
- Founder: Sergio Taselli (2002)
- Defunct: 1998 (re-opened in 2002; 24 years ago)
- Headquarters: Ferreyra, Córdoba, Argentina
- Key people: Máximo Taselli (President)
- Products: Diesel locomotives Railcars; Buses
- Number of employees: 400
- Parent: Fiat Concord (1958–80); Sevel Argentina (1980-98)
- Divisions: Railway; Buses
- Subsidiaries: Maraní Agrinar (combine harvesters)
- Website: materfer.com

Materfer (an acronym for Material Ferroviario S.A.) is an Argentine manufacturer of railway and road vehicles, located in the city of Ferreyra in Córdoba Province. The company was established by Fiat Concord in the late 1950s, being its subsidiary until 1980 when Sevel Argentina took over Fiat vehicles.

Materfer has built several types of rolling stock in its history, such as diesel locomotives, coaches and trams, most of them for the state-owned company Ferrocarriles Argentinos which operated trains within Argentina from 1948 to 1991. The company has also exported its products to Cuba, Bolivia, Uruguay and Chile.

Materfer owns a 66,000-square-metre (710,000 sq ft) factory with 200 machines, mainly electrofusion, folding, sheet metal cutters and overhead crane machines. In the 1980s Materfer employed 2,500 people, mainly in the manufacture of diesel locomotives, coaches and railcars for the Argentine and international markets. The factory produced about one coach per day. Materfer has also produced combine harvesters under the brand "Maraní Agrinar". Nowadays the company has 400 employees working at its factory in Ferreyra.

== History ==
=== First years and development ===
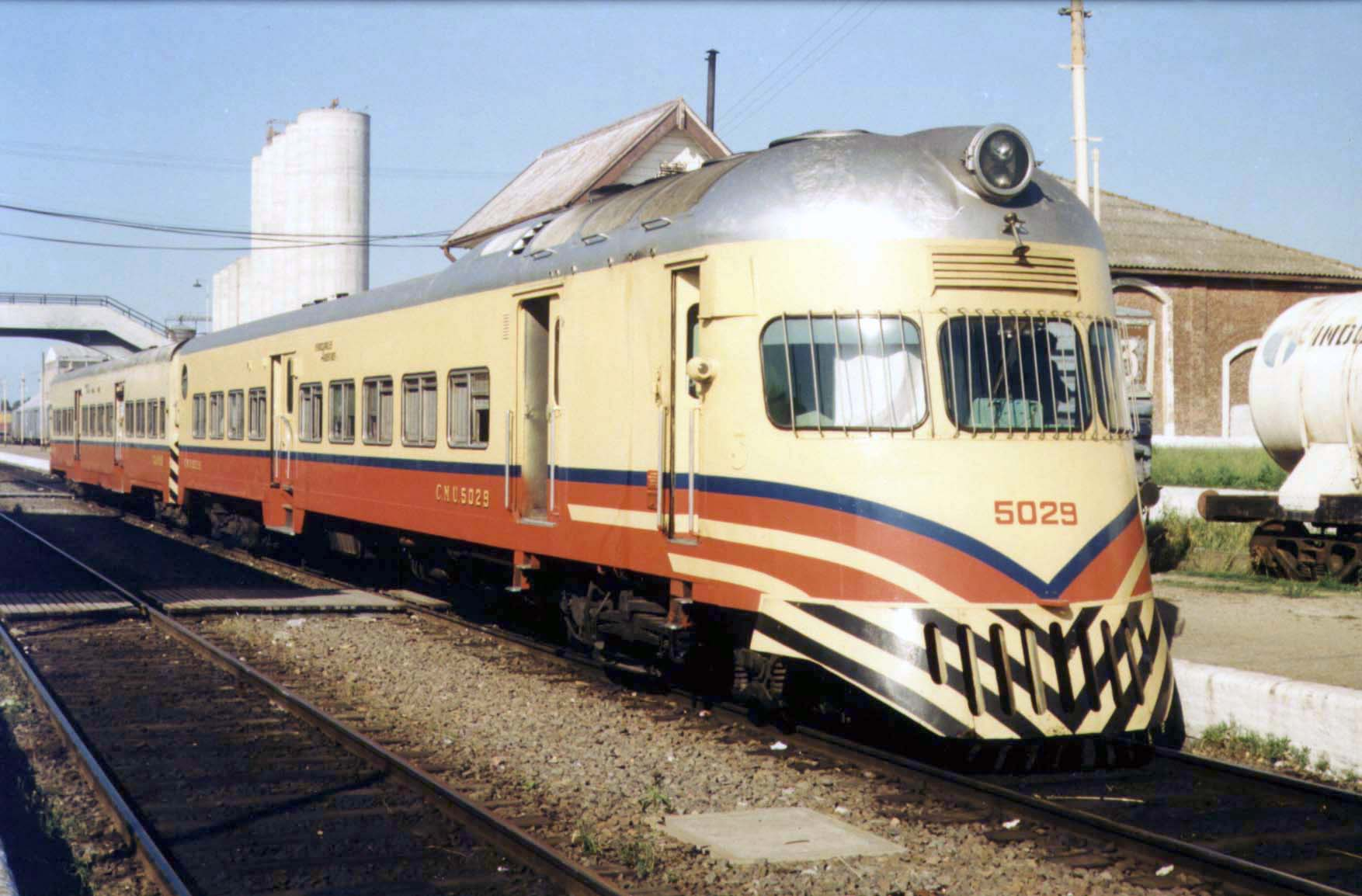
Diesel railcar 7131, first built in 1962.

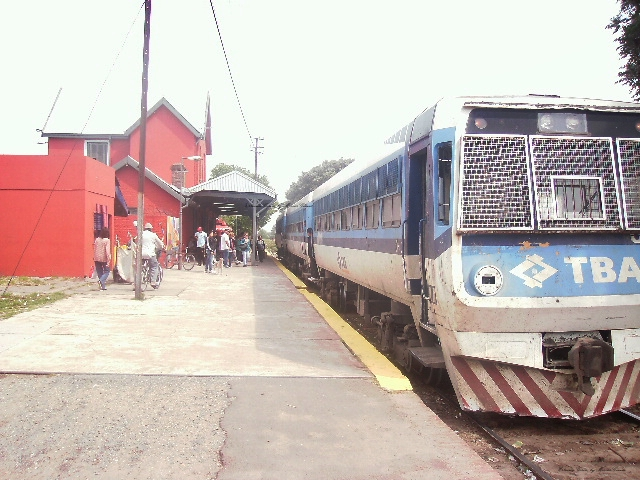
Light railcar (Pitufo) in Garín.

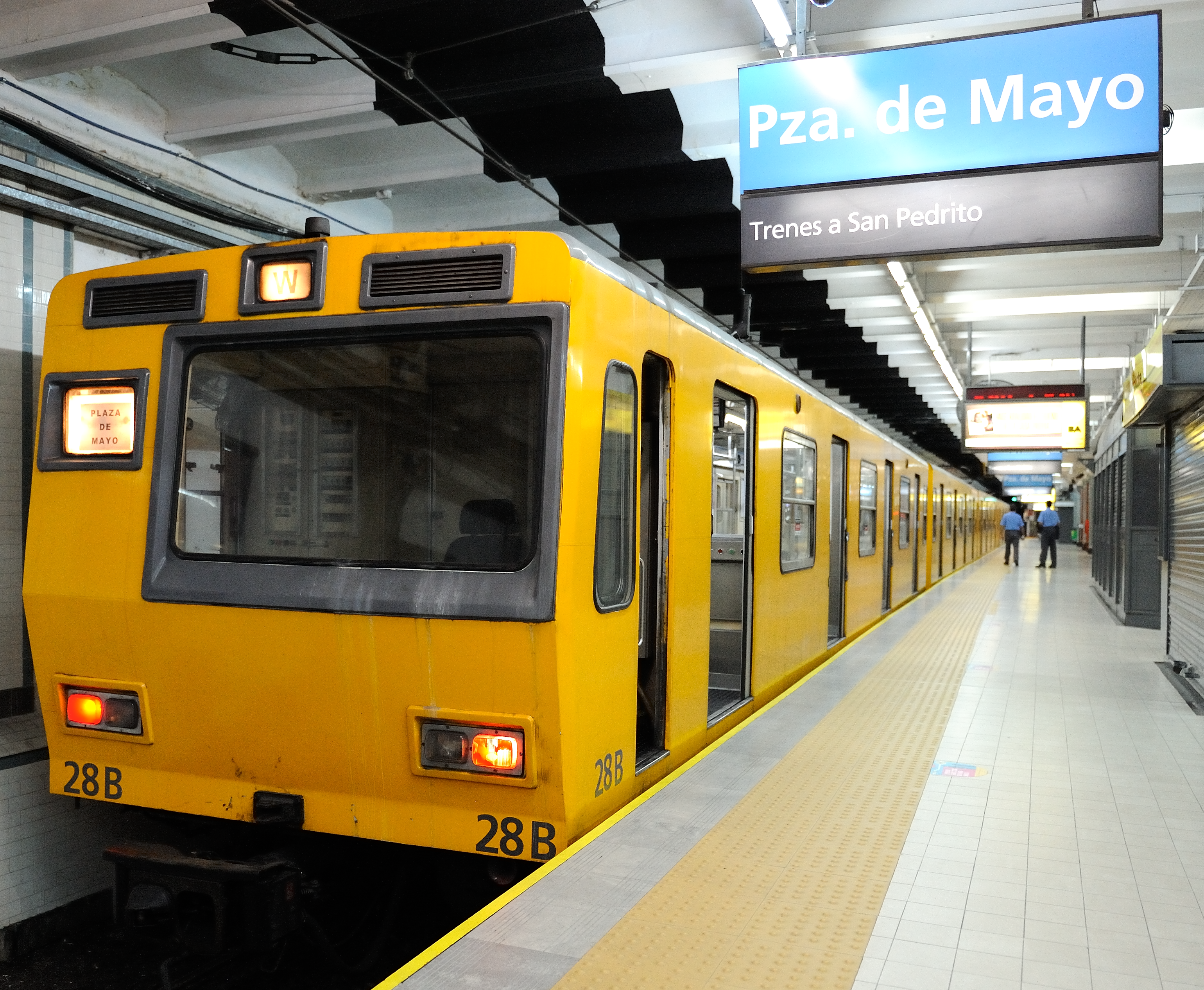
A Fiat-Materfer subway train on Line A of the Buenos Aires Underground.

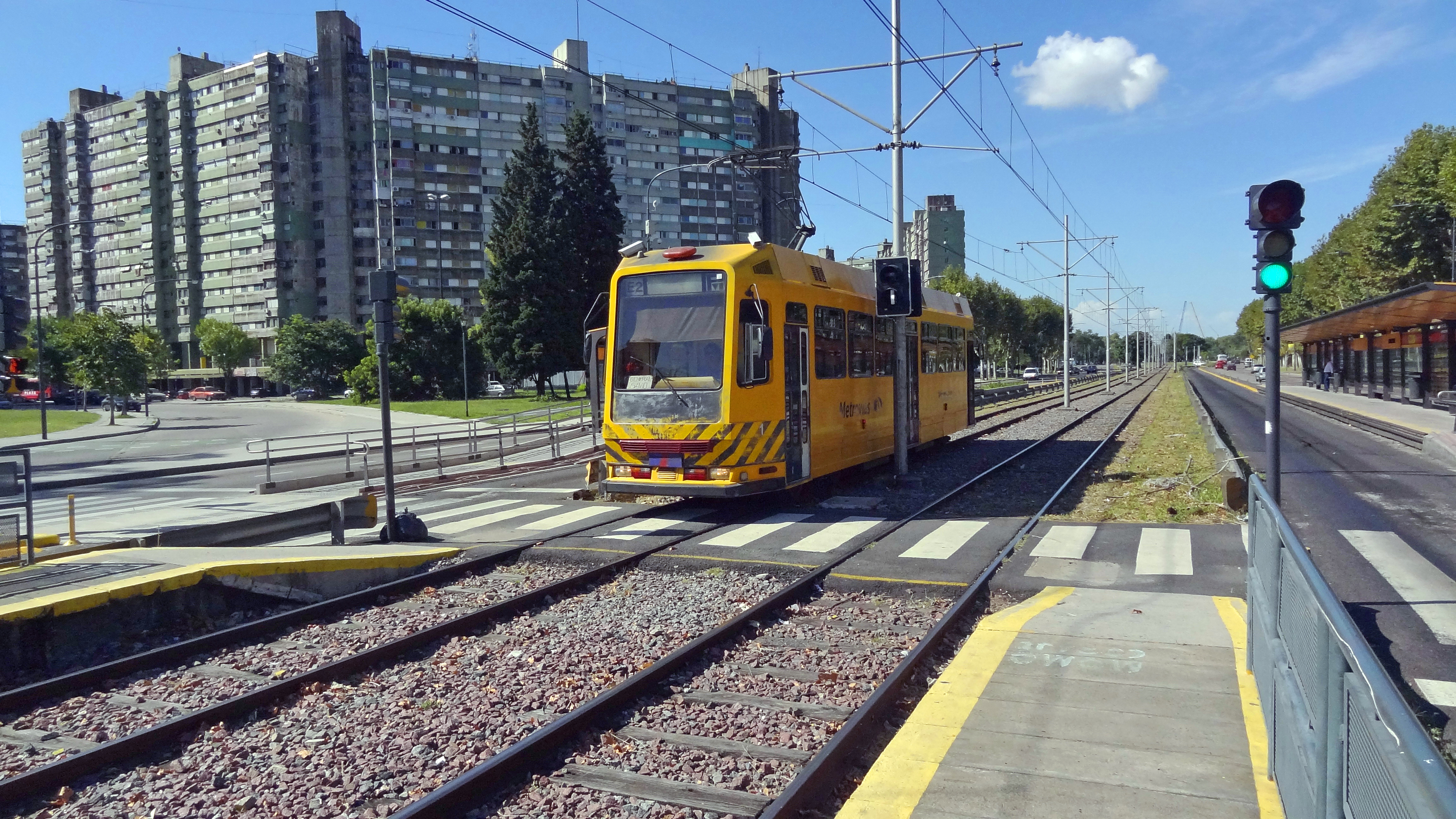
Tram made for the Buenos Aires PreMetro.

Materfer was established by Fiat Ferroviaria, through Fiat Concord, a consortium formed by many FIAT subsidiaries operating in Argentina. The company built a factory to manufacture rolling stock in the country to provide goods for Ferrocarriles Argentinos, the state-owned company that operated all the railway network then.

The factory started operations in 1958, producing Materfer's first diesel multiple unit, the 7131, in 1962. Between 1956 and 1968, a consortium of Italian and Argentine companies, "Gruppo Aziende Italo Argentine" (GAIA), is founded to manufacture spares and parts for the GAIA locomotives.

In 1958 the Ministry of Transport of Argentina signed an agreement with Fiat Ferroviaria to acquire 210 brand-new railcars. Those machines were formed by 2 units powered by a FIAT diesel engine at 660 HP. The railcars could reach speeds of 115 km/h. Their low weight made them suitable to run on any railway line. The vehicles also had two driver cabins, one on each end of the car, which reduced the time of manoeuvres at termini stations, particularly in urban services.

Railcars were built in the FIAT factories of Turin, Decauville and Córdoba. Although the first railcars were manufactured in Italy and France, most of them were made in Argentina, in a factory specially designed for that assignment located in Ferreyra, Córdoba and named "Materfer".

Some versions stated that the 7131 was inspired on the 1934 Pioneer Zephyr, a diesel-powered railroad train formed of railroad cars permanently articulated together with Jacobs bogies, built by the Budd Company in 1934 for the Chicago, Burlington and Quincy Railroad (CB&Q), commonly known as the Burlington. The train featured extensive use of stainless steel, was originally named the Zephyr, and was meant as a promotional tool to advertise passenger rail service in the United States.

In 1962, the 7131, a railcar manufactured by FIAT Concord, made its debut in the Villa Ballester–Zárate and Victoria–Capilla del Señor sections of General Mitre Railway, then managed by Ferrocarriles Argentinos. Those light cars replaced Ganz Works railcars that had been run on those lines since 1938.

In 1964, 27 coaches built by Aerfer, a subsidiary of FIAT Ferroviaria, were added to the Belgrano Norte line. Four years later, the fleet was expanded with the addition of 20 coaches which replaced the old ones made in Tafí Viejo. In 1975 Materfer supplied more coaches (named "FIAT III") for the line.

=== Later years and bankruptcy ===
During the 1980s Materfer began to export its products, and the factory also manufactured a line of diesel locomotives, named "Transfer".

In the early to mid 1980s, the company built the Fiat-Materfer underground cars for use on the Buenos Aires Underground. The intention of these trainsets was to create a standardised fleet for the Underground network - which had a diverse range of rolling stock at the time - in order to reduce the maintenance costs associated with having many different models, and also to replace the ageing rolling stock of the network. Ultimately, only enough of these were built to service just Line E rather than the entire network. Nevertheless, they have served many years on the network and today they are used as temporary stand-ins in lines where newer rolling stock is arriving, and is thus being slowly phased-out of the network.

The lack of maintenance of the FIAT 7131 coaches put some of them out of service, so in 1987 Ferrocarriles Argentinos looked to Materfer to provide light railcars for the Zárate and Capilla del Señor branches. The company bought 8 units made by Materfer and soon nicknamed them Pitufos (a Spanish translation for "Smurfs") due to their small size. Nevertheless, the low passenger capacity and poor damping of those units made many of the 7131 remain active.

In the late 1980s and early 1990s the company built its last vehicles under the FIAT Ferroviaria name, an order of trams for Premetro line E2 in the city of Buenos Aires. In February 1998 the company declared bankruptcy and therefore closed.

== Second era ==
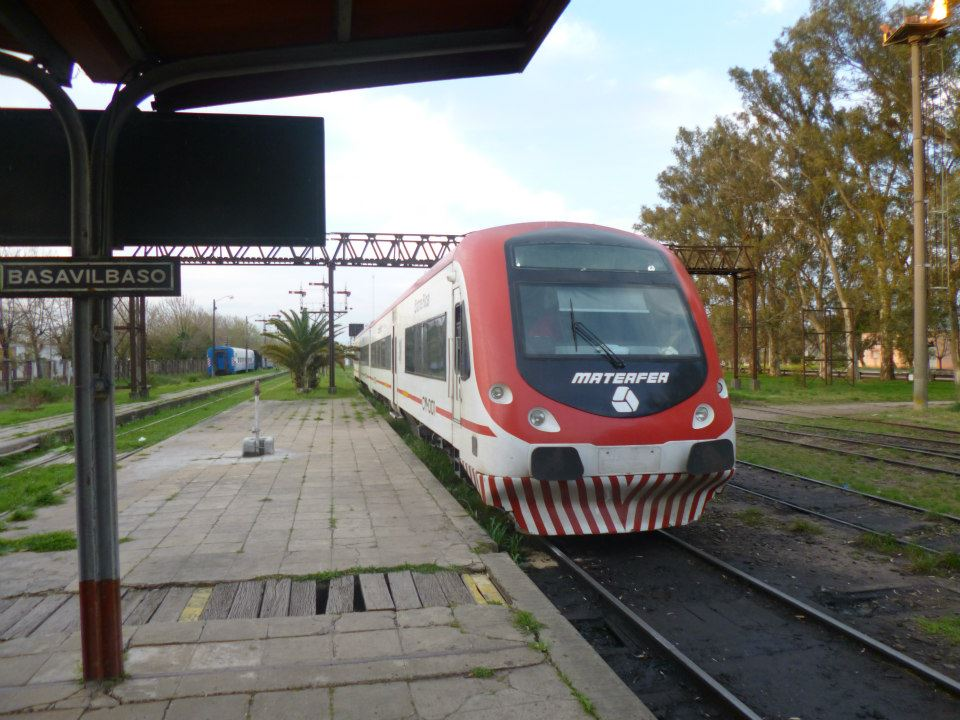
A Materfer CMM 400-2 on the General Urquiza Railway.

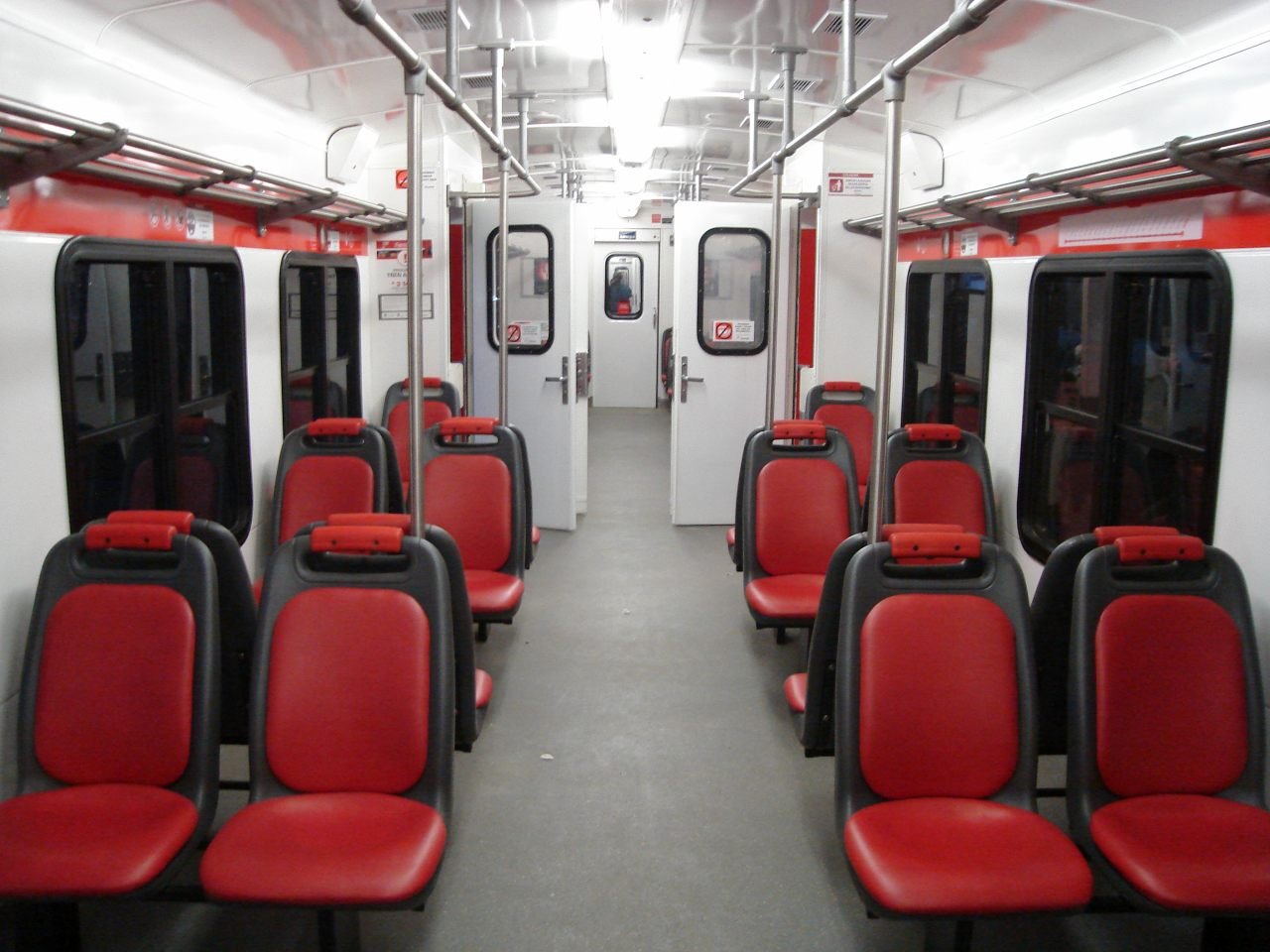
Interior of a coach that runs at Belgrano Norte Line.

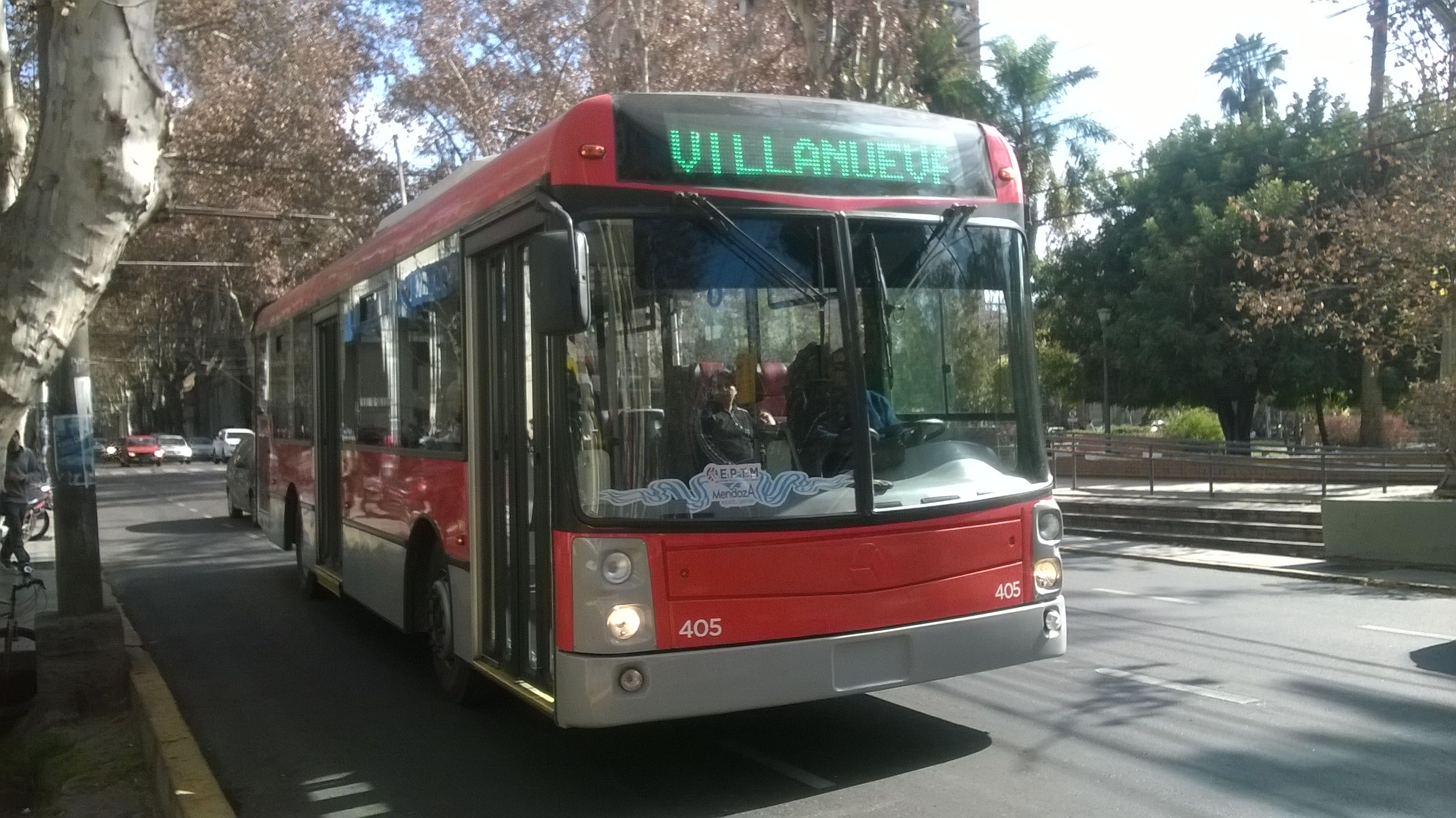
A Materfer trolleybus in Mendoza.

When Argentine railways were privatised, 8 of the FIAT 7131 cars were sent to serve at Merlo-Lobos branch of Sarmiento Line and the rest continued to serve at the Retiro–Victoria branches of Mitre Line. Their original engines were replaced by Cummins ones. The units on the Mitre Line was also equipped with air conditioning, while seats were upholstered in corduroy and floors carpeted.

In March 2002, Materfer was acquired by Argentine entrepreneur Sergio Taselli and reopened with only 5 employees. In 2007, the Government of Argentina authorised Materfer to operate as an automotive company. The decree, signed by then president Néstor Kirchner, allowed the company to buy and import spares as well as to export finished vehicles. Therefore Materfer started to produce buses for urban services in company's factory at Ferreyra.

After the Government of Argentina took over freight railway company Belgrano Cargas, Materfer offered to build the rolling stock to supply the 7,040 km length of the line. The company stated that it could produce 6 locomotives per year.

Materfer also supplied railcars for the Entre Ríos railways, mainly the Basavilbaso–Concordia and Paraná–Concepción del Uruguay branches, currently operated by Trenes Argentinos S.E.

Some 7131 railcars were also refurbished in 2008 and used by Private company Trenes Especiales Argentinos (TEA) to run passenger services from F. Lacroze (Buenos Aires) to Posadas in Misiones Province.

In 2012–13, Materfer built a prototype trolleybus for the Mendoza trolleybus system, based on designs developed by that system's operator, the Empresa Provincial de Transportes de Mendoza (EPTM). The completed vehicle, which was the first trolleybus built in Argentina in 24 years, was delivered in March 2013 and entered service in June. It is an 11.23-metre (36.8 ft), low-floor design. In July 2013, EPTM placed an order with Materfer for 12 production-series trolleybuses of the same design, the delivery of which began in 2014.

In 2014 Materfer launched the MTF-3300, a diesel locomotive equipped with 6 engines of 500 HP each. The machines were produced from an agreement with American company National Railway Equipment and its design was based on General Motors GT-26 model. A total of AR$ 100 million were invested to develop the project. Those locomotives were produced for freight services in Argentina, with expectations to export the machines to Brazil.

In April 2015 Materfer produced CMM 400-2 railcars for the Tren del Valle that runs between the cities of Neuquén and Cipolletti in Rio Negro Province. The company was also committed to build 20 railcars for other re-opening projected in Chaco and Salta. The railcars (CMM-400-2) finally arrived in Chaco on June.

In 2015 CMM 400-2 trainsets were acquired for and incorporated into the diesel segment of the Mitre Line, running services from Victoria to Capilla del Señor in Greater Buenos Aires.

=== Current models ===
- CMM 400-2 – Diesel Multiple Unit
- MTF-3300 – Diesel-electric freight locomotive
- CT 72 – Freight wagons
- MD 128 – Bus

== See also ==
- Fiat Materfer 7131 - railcars built for urban services in the 1960s
- Fiat-Materfer cars - built for the Buenos Aires Underground
- Emepa Group - Another contemporary Argentine manufacturer of DMUs
