= General Galarza =

Coordinates: 32°43′S 59°24′W

- Municipality and village
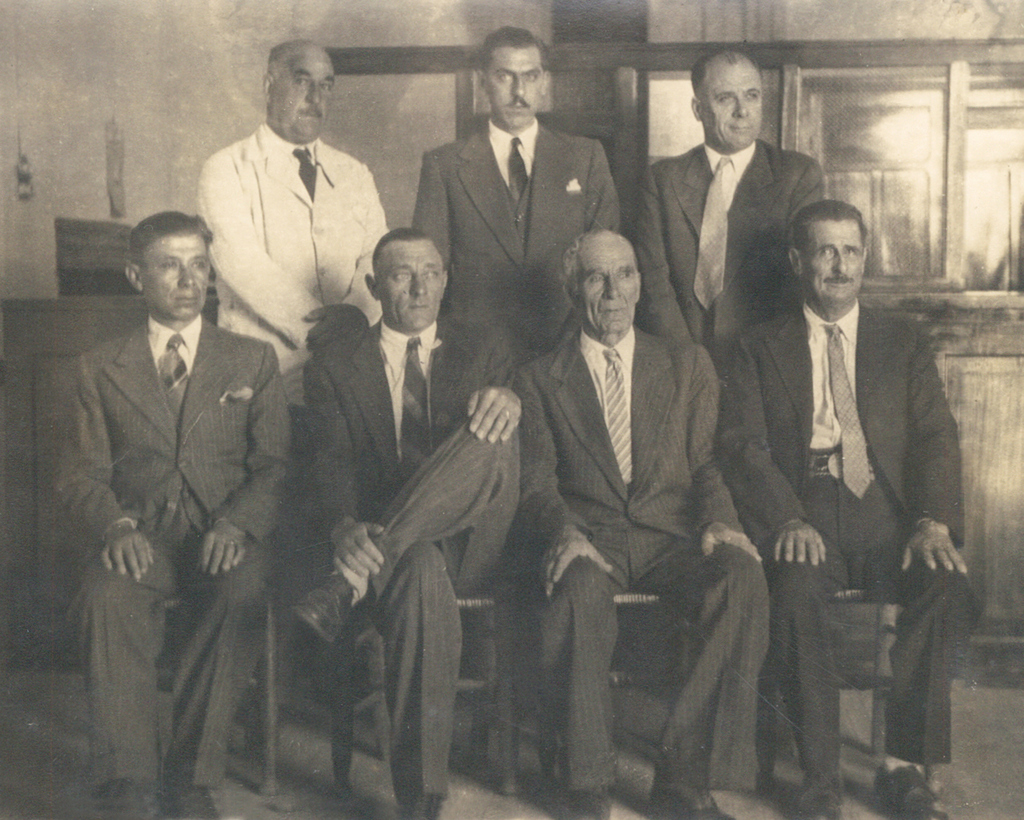

- Location within Argentina
- Country: Argentina
- Province: Entre Ríos Province
- Department: Gualeguay Department
- Time zone: UTC−3 (ART)

General Galarza is a village and municipality in Gualeguay Department, Entre Ríos Province in north-eastern Argentina.
