= ROU Uruguay =

ROU Uruguay is the name of the following ships of the Uruguayan Navy, named for Uruguay:

- ROU Uruguay (DE-1), ex-USS Baron, a Cannon-class destroyer escort acquired in 1952, stricken in 1990, and sunk as a target in 1995
- ROU Uruguay (01), ex-Commandant Bourdais, a Commandant Rivière-class frigate acquired from France in 1991 and decommissioned in 2008

== See also ==
- Uruguay (disambiguation)
