= Tomás de Rocamora =

Argentine politician (1740–1819)

Juan Tomás Julián Marcos de Rocamora y del Castillo (27 April 1740 – 16 March 1819) was the governor of three provinces and the founder of several towns in Entre Ríos Province, Argentina.

Born in Granada, Nicaragua, he moved to Spain at an early age. In 1750 he entered the Spanish Royal Guard. As an officer he came to the Río de la Plata to fight in Montevideo, Uruguay against the Portuguese. In 1782 he was sent to explore and pacify the area of the settlements around the Uruguay River by the newly installed Viceroy Juan José de Vértiz y Salcedo. He founded five towns in present-day Entre Ríos, among them Gualeguay, Concepción del Uruguay and Gualeguaychú. He was also the first to use (in letters to the viceroy) the name Entre Ríos (literally "Between Rivers") for the land whose southern limits are the rivers Uruguay and Paraná.

Rocamora was the governor of three provinces of the Argentine Mesopotamia: Entre Ríos, Corrientes and Misiones. He was the governor of Misiones when the May Revolution of 1810 installed the first national government in Buenos Aires, and accepted its authority. He was relieved from his post at the age of 71, and in 1812 he retired from the army as a colonel.

Rocamora died in 1819, at the age of 79. Today, his remains rest at the Basilica of Our Lady of Mercy in Buenos Aires. By a decree of the government of Entre Ríos, since 1958 Rocamora's work is remembered on 11 August.

== Sources ==
- LaCalle. Fundación de la histórica ciudad de Concepción del Uruguay.
- University of Commercial Sciences, Nicaragua. El Granadino Tomás de Rocamora.
