= Beatriz Bonnet =

Argentinian actor (1930–2020)

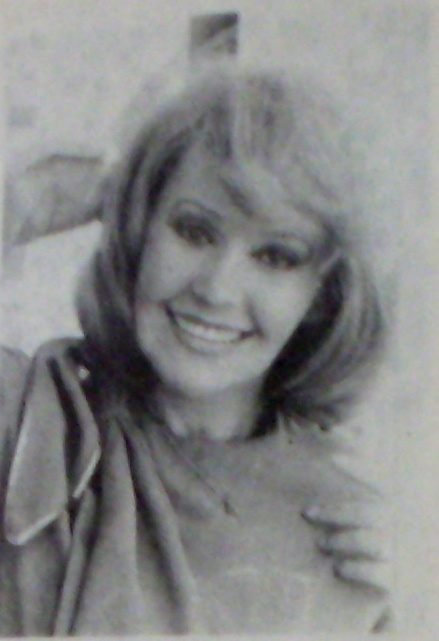
- Beatriz Bonnet in 1982
- Born: Nelly Beatris Bonnet; 11 December 1930; Gualeguay
- Died: 19 February 2020 (aged 89); Buenos Aires
- Occupation: Actress
- Awards: Martín Fierro Award

Nelly Beatriz Bonnet (born Nelly Beatris Auchter Bonnet; 11 December 1930 – 19 February 2020) was an Argentine film and television actress and comedian.

== Biography ==
Beatriz Bonnet was born in Gualeguay, Entre Ríos on 11 December 1930 to Mariana Amelia Bonnet, a single mother. Mariana's father was Ernest Bonnet, an English immigrant man.

At 15, Bonnet married a man named López Verde, but the couple split a year later. She moved to Buenos Aires, where she studied dance, singing, and acting. While working at a candy shop, Bonnet was recruited by Pedro R. Bravo to act in Mansedumbre, the first film to be shot in Tucumán Province. In mid-1951, she joined the staff of the Cinematographic Institute of the National University of Tucumán, at that time being funded by the Argentine government.

Bonnet entered the Institute of Modern Art in Buenos Aires and was hired by theatre director Francisco Gallo to perform in comedies in the Astral Theater. She took classes with Hedy Crilla.

On television, Bonnet made her debut performing in operettas on Televisión Pública Argentina's Channel 7. She was the replacement actress for Rosita Quintana in a production My Fair Lady, performing so well in one day that the audience cheered for her and indefinitely replaced Quintana. Bonnet would also play in TV musical comedies such as La dama del Maxim's, Descalzos en el parque, and Mame.

== Filmography ==
Year	Title	Role	Notes
1953	Mansedumbre		
1953	El pecado más lindo del mundo		
1955	Canario rojo		
1956	Novia para dos		
1962	Operación G		
1963	Los que verán a Dios		
1964	El club del clan		
1965	La pérgola de las flores		
1966	Con el más puro amor		
1966	Villa Delicia: playa de estacionamiento, música ambiental		
1966	Necesito una madre		
1968	Un muchacho como yo	Mercedes Ramos	
1969	El bulín	M.D. Livingstone	
1970	Pasión dominguera		
1973	Um Caipira em Bariloche	Nora	
1976	El profesor erótico		
1984	Sálvese quien pueda	Luisa	
1998	Mar de amores	Adela	
