= Fiat Materfer 7131 =

Argentine diesel multiple unit railcar class

Fiat–Materfer 7131
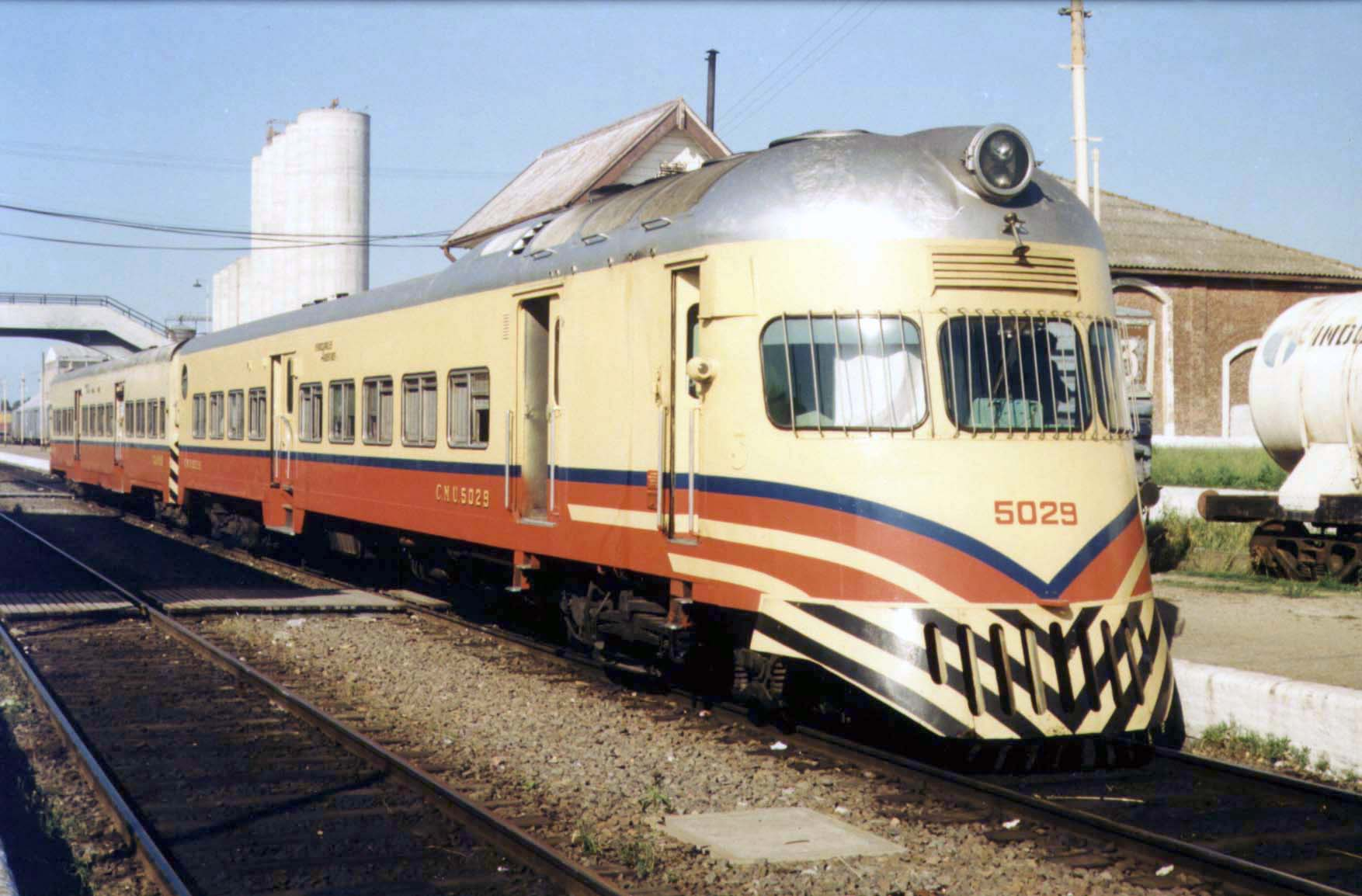
- A 7131 railcar at Cañuelas station, 1990.
- Manufacturer: FIAT Ferroviaria; Materfer
- Built at: Italy; Ferreyra, Córdoba, Argentina
- Constructed: 1960-1963
- Entered service: 1962-c.1995
- Number built: 339
- Number preserved: 2
- Formation: 2-6 cars per trainset
- Capacity: 72-107 seats
- Operators: Ferrocarriles Argentinos
- Lines served: Roca, Urquiza, Mitre, Sarmiento

Specifications
- Doors: 2 per side
- Maximum speed: 50 mph (90 km/h)
- Prime mover(s): Diesel
- Coupling system: Buffer and chain
- Track gauge: 1,435 mm (4 ft 8 1/2 in); 5 ft 6 in (1,676 mm)

The 7131 was an Argentine diesel multiple unit class, first produced in Italy by Fiat Ferroviaria, then licensed to Argentine company Materfer to continue the manufacturing. Those railcars were introduced in the 1960s to replace the existing rolling stock of most of the urban services of Argentina, such as Roca, Urquiza, Mitre and Sarmiento lines.

Following the privatisation of the Argentine railways in the early 1990s, the 7131 fell into disuse, being replaced by other light models built by Materfer. They are commonly nicknamed Chanchas (Spanish for Piggies)

== History ==
=== Background ===
In 1958 the Ministry of Transport of Argentina signed an agreement with Fiat Ferroviaria to acquire 210 brand-new railcars. Those machines were formed by 2 units powered by a FIAT diesel engine at 660 HP. The railcars could reach speeds of 115 km/h. Their low weight made them suitable to run on any railway line. The vehicles also had two driver cabins, one on each end of the car, which reduced the time of manoeuvres at termini stations, particularly in urban services.

At the time, the Mitre and Sarmiento lines still used the Drewry Car Co. railcars, acquired in the 1930s. Those coaches had become obsolete due to the increasing number of passengers carried by those lines, which required rolling stock with higher capacity.

=== Production ===
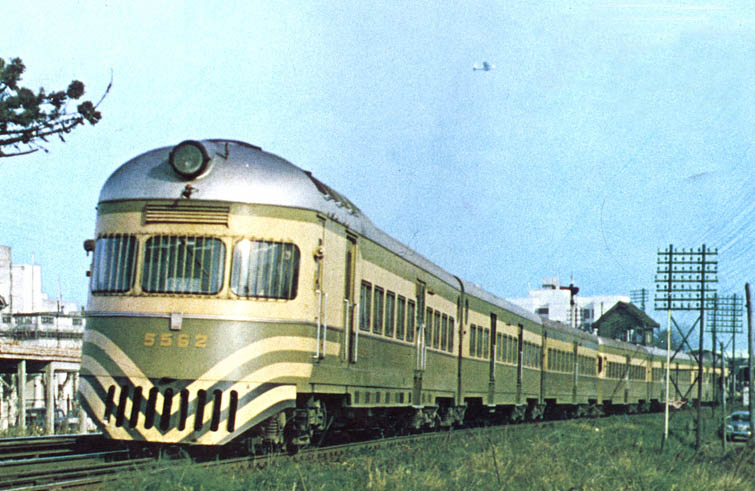
The first 7131 railcars painted in green and ochre, c. 1963.

Railcars were built in the FIAT factories of Turin, Decauville and Córdoba. Although the first railcars were manufactured in Italy and France, most of them were made in Argentina, in a factory specially designed for that assignment located in Ferreyra, Córdoba and named "Materfer".

Some versions stated that the 7131 was inspired on the 1934 Pioneer Zephyr, a diesel-powered railroad train formed of railroad cars permanently articulated together with Jacobs bogies, built by the Budd Company in 1934 for the Chicago, Burlington and Quincy Railroad (CB&Q), commonly known as the Burlington. The train featured extensive use of stainless steel, was originally named the Zephyr, and was meant as a promotional tool to advertise passenger rail service in the United States.

The first 7131 models made their debut in all the standard and broad gauges lines (Roca, Mitre, Urquiza and Sarmiento railways, with the exception of the San Martín railway, which renewed its rolling stock with material by Ganz Works). The first units were painted in green and ochre, although later all would be painted in the official Ferrocarriles Argentinos colors (yellow, blue and red).

In 1962, the first 7131, manufactured by FIAT Concord, made its debut on the Villa Ballester–Zárate and Victoria–Capilla del Señor sections of Mitre Railway. Those light cars replaced Ganz railcars that had been running on those lines since 1938. The 7131 also served in some lines of Santa Fe province.

On the Roca and Sarmiento lines the 7131 replaced old Drewry, Birmingham and Armstrong Whitworth coaches in the Temperley–La Plata–Cañuelas; Haedo–José Mármol, Merlo–Lobos, Pereyra–Ensenada, La Plata–Pipinas–Atalaya–Magdalena; Moreno–Luján–Mercedes, Lobos–Navarro, among other suburban branches. The 7131 also served on Bahía Blanca–Darregueira–Carmen de Patagones; Constitución–TandilNecochea, covering a large area of the south and west of Buenos Aires Province.

=== Decline ===
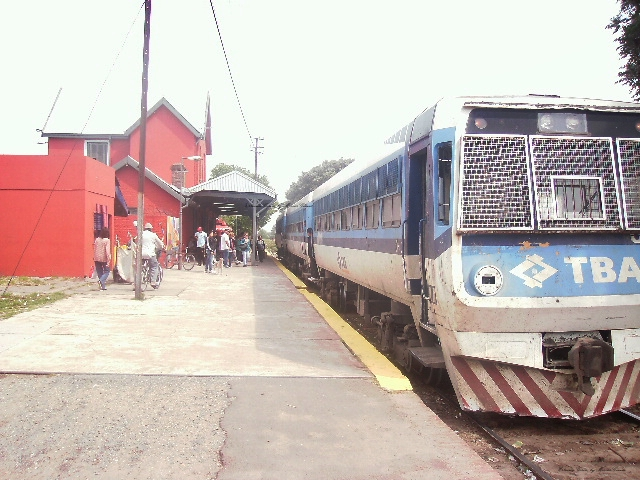
Light cars by Materfer replaced 7131 under the TBA's administration.

By the 1990s, the 7131 only served on some local services (Temperley–Haedo, La Plata, Río Santiago; Merlo–Lobos and Villa Ballester–Zárate). The lack of maintenance by parent company Ferrocarriles Argentinos resulted in the deterioration of the coaches, that were frequently damaged with some units being even on fire. As a result, the number of units suitable for service decreased considerably.

With the privatisation of the Argentine railways, the 7131 railcars were declared obsolete and replaced by other models manufactured by Materfer. The last line served by the 7131 was the Victoria–Capilla del Señor line on the Mitre railway. The Mitre Line's concessionary, Trenes de Buenos Aires, then acquired 8 new units made by Materfer and soon nicknamed them Pitufos (a Spanish translation for "Smurfs") due to their small size. Nevertheless, the low passenger capacity and poor damping of those units resulted in many of the 7131 remaining active.

During those years, a cooperative named "Ferroser" announced the reopening of the Ringuelet-Brandsen line, using 7131 railcars. Nevertheless, the project was never carried out.

A short revival of the 7131 occurred in 2008, when defunct company Trenes Especiales Argentinos used a railcar (that had been previously refurbished) to run the Gran Capitán service between F. Lacroze to Posadas, Misiones.

== See also ==
- Rail transport in Argentina
- Materfer
