= Trolleybuses in Mendoza =

Coordinates: 32°53′S 68°49′W

Mendoza trolleybus system
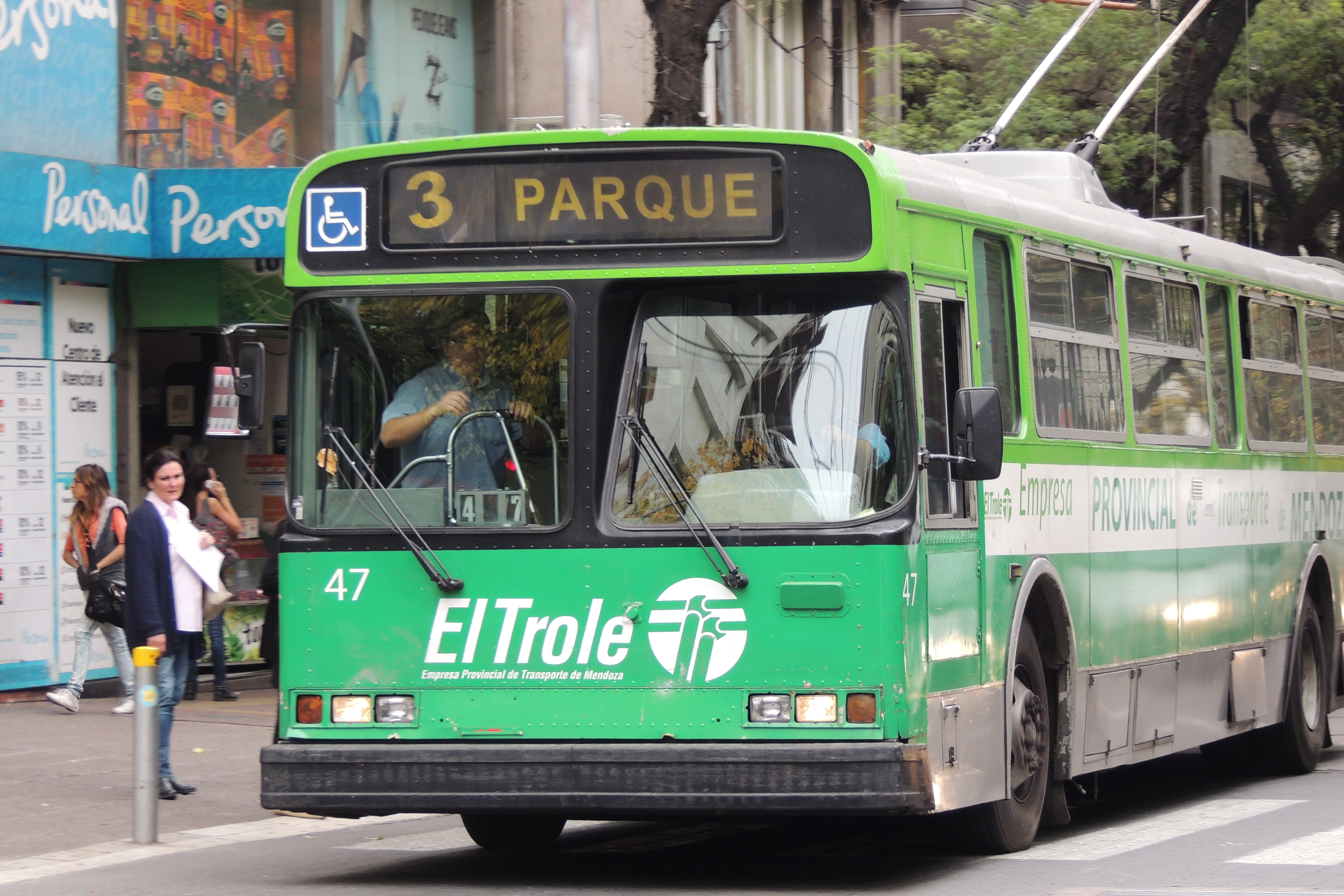
- An ex-Vancouver Flyer trolleybus in Mendoza in 2014

Operation
- Locale: Mendoza, Argentina
- Open: 14 February 1958
- Close: February 2021
- Status: Closed
- Routes: 1 (6 until 2017)
- Owner: Province of Mendoza
- Operators: 1958–2016: Empresa Provincial de Transportes de Mendoza (EPTM); 2017-2021: Sociedad de Transporte de Mendoza, SA (STM)

Infrastructure
- Electrification: 600 V DC

The Mendoza trolleybus system (Spanish: Sistema de trolebuses de Mendoza) formed part of the public transport network in Mendoza, the capital city of Mendoza Province, Argentina. It was owned by the provincial government.

Opened in 1958, the system expanded to three routes by 1961 and remained relatively static in size and configuration until 1989, when a fourth route opened. Additional routes opened in 2004 and 2005, bringing the system to its maximum extent of six routes, which linked the city center with some of its metropolitan suburbs. However, one of the original routes (Villanueva) was suspended from 2005 to 2011, and consequently no more than five routes were operating concurrently during that period.

In the 2010s, the provincial government entity that had always operated the system, the Empresa Provincial de Transportes de Mendoza (EPTM), began to experience increasingly worsening financial problems, due in large part to difficulties in keeping its fleet of approximately 30-year-old trolleybuses operating reliably. Construction projects around the city, including work on the new Metrotranvía Mendoza light rail system, also disrupted trolleybus service, and the actual number of trolleybuses in service declined considerably.

At the end of 2016, the provincial legislature voted to dissolve EPTM entirely and replace it with a new company, the Sociedad de Transporte de Mendoza (STM), and this change was put into effect on 1 January 2017. All remaining trolleybus service was suspended on 4 May 2017. A plan to make the suspension a permanent closure gave way to one calling for retention of trolleybus service on one route, the Parque route (the system's very first route, dating to 1958), with the other five routes permanently closed. The suspension lasted 16 months, and trolleybus service resumed on the Parque route in January 2019. Service was discontinued again, this time permanently, in February 2021. Dismantling of the overhead wires began in September 2023.

== History ==
=== 20th century ===
The system traces its origins to law number 825, enacted in 1958 with the goal of making a trolleybus system one of the main means of transport in the city and the suburbs surrounding it.

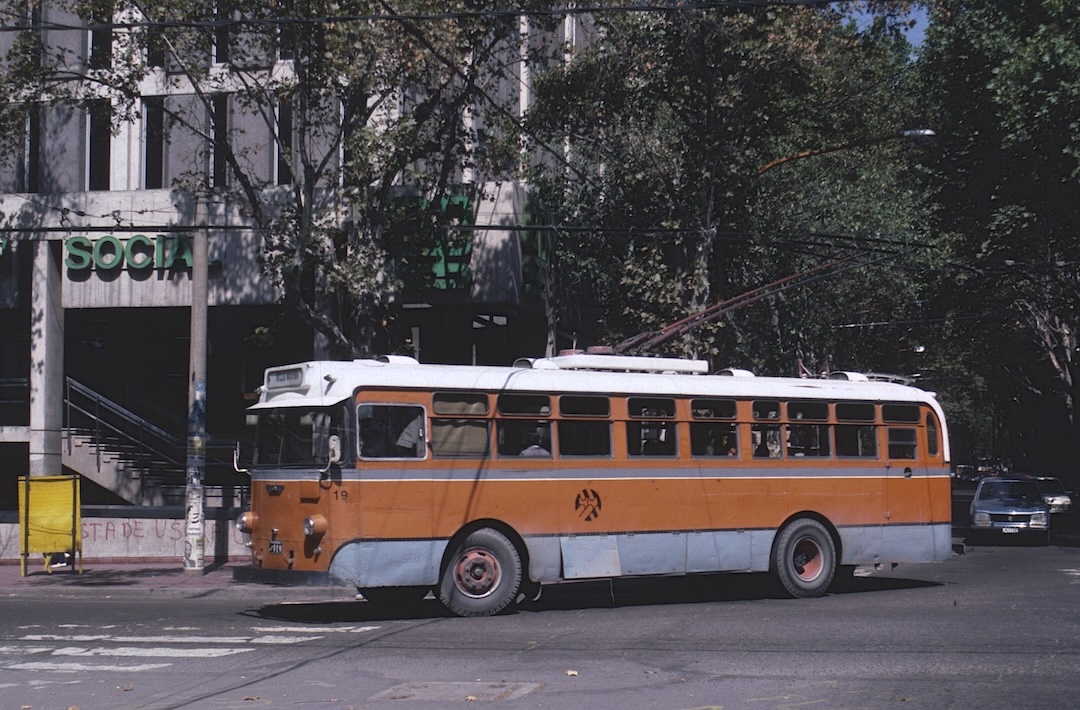
For more than 20 years, the entire fleet consisted of Japanese-built Toshiba trolleybuses delivered in 1962.

On 14 February 1958, at the intersection of 9 de Julio and Necochea streets, Dr. Isidoro Bousquet formally opened Mendoza's trolleybus system. The first line to be put into service by the system's operator, the Empresa Provincial de Transportes de Mendoza (EPTM), was the "Parque" line, also known as line number 1. To this day, that line still follows the same route (9 de Julio, Colón, Arístides Villanueva, Boulogne Sur Mer, Jorge A. Calle, Perú and Godoy Cruz streets). The system's second line, "Villa Nueva", opened in February 1959 and the third, "Dorrego", in March 1961. Publicly, the routes were designated by names only, not numbers, and this practice continued until the mid-1990s and was revived in the 2010s.

=== 21st century ===
The Mendoza trolleybus system was still expanding significantly as recently as the mid-2000s, with the construction of a long new line connecting Godoy Cruz with Las Heras, and of a shorter line connecting the bus terminal with the National University of Cuyo. These opened in April 2004 and October 2005, respectively. The Las Heras – Godoy Cruz line is 15 km (9.3 mi) long. More recently, in November 2013, an extension of the Dorrego route was opened.

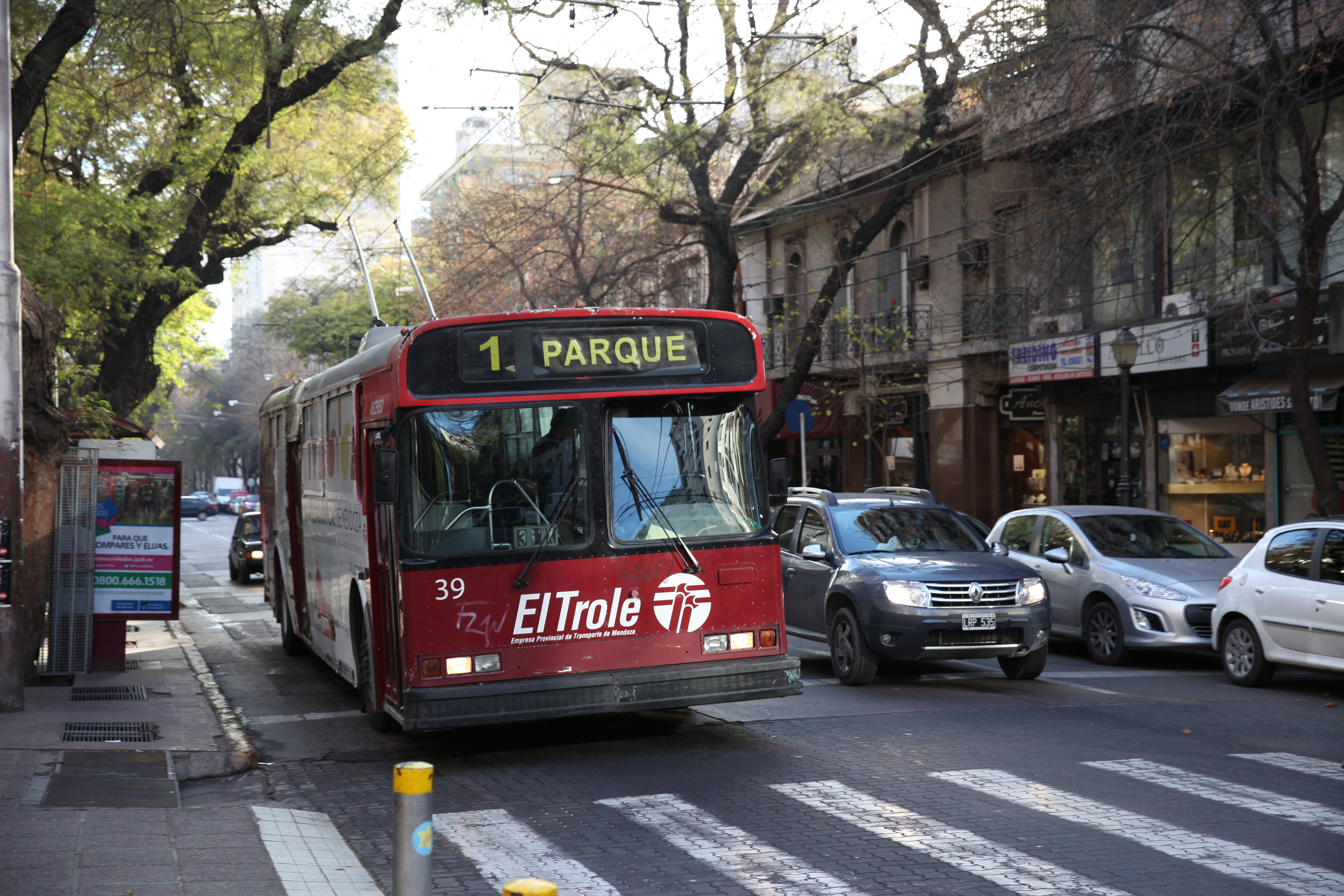
One of the ex-Vancouver vehicles in service on the Parque route in 2014. These vehicles were retired in 2017.

In 2009–10, the entire trolleybus fleet was replaced with Flyer trolleybuses acquired secondhand from the Vancouver trolleybus system, in Canada. Although already 26 years old at the time, these vehicles were believed to be in better condition than EPTM's then-existing fleet of secondhand German trolleybuses built in the 1970s. EPTM refurbished them before placing them in service. The number of serviceable trolleybuses in the fleet grew to 60 by 2010, and the scheduled peak vehicle requirement was 48. Service on the Villa Nueva (alternatively spelled Villanueva) route resumed in 2011, ending a six-year suspension attributed mainly to long delays in work to renew or refurbish its deteriorated overhead wiring.

However, by early 2011 EPTM was having trouble keeping the ex-Vancouver vehicles running reliably. By the end of 2011, the situation had already worsened considerably, with only 40 of the 60–62 vehicles being listed as serviceable but only around 25 typically available for service after subtracting nominally serviceable vehicles that were awaiting correction of minor defects. During several periods in the early 2010s, one or two routes (from among three affected routes) were temporarily operated by motorbuses for extended periods due to the need for detours caused by construction of the Metrotranvía Mendoza light rail system.

In 2012, EPTM took delivery of a new low-floor trolleybus built in Argentina by Materfer, which EPTM had helped to design. It entered service in June 2012, at which time 47 Flyer trolleybuses were considered serviceable. Additional new Materfer vehicles were purchased subsequently, and a total of 13 were built, but only 12 ever entered service.

Meanwhile, EPTM continued to experience reliability problems with the Flyer trolleybuses, now more than 30 years old, and a large number were withdrawn from service between 2013 and 2015. In mid-September 2016, only eleven Flyers were available for service, along with 12 Materfer trolleybuses.

==== Change of operator, suspension ====
At the end of 2016, the provincial government dissolved EPTM, which had been the trolleybus's only operator for its entire history up to that time (nearly 59 years), after concluding that its financial losses were too great. It was immediately replaced, on 1 January 2017, by a new operating company named Sociedad de Transporte de Mendoza (STM), a newly formed single-shareholder public corporation (a Sociedad Anónima Unipersonal, or SAU), a private company that is, however, still owned by the provincial government. In late 2016, the Villa Nueva and Godoy Cruz–Las Heras routes were being operated by motorbuses due to a shortage of serviceable trolleybuses. On 1 January 2017, the provincial authority divided the latter route, the system's longest, into two routes and transferred their operation to a different company, with motorbuses replacing all trolleybus service in that corridor.

In late March 2017, the provincial transport secretary announced plans to close the trolleybus system entirely by the end of the year. Later, it was decided that all trolleybus service would be suspended, due to ongoing disruption caused by several construction projects around the city, but would resume late in 2017 on one or more routes—but likely for only a few months before a permanent closure. The last day of trolleybus service was 4 May 2017, when just one vehicle (Materfer No. 408) was in service, on the Pellegrini route. By mid-2018, it had been decided that trolleybus service would be reinstated on only one route, the Parque route, with the others being now considered permanently closed. Also, only the modern Materfer trolleybuses would return to service, with all remaining ex-Vancouver Flyer vehicles now permanently retired. The planned resumption of trolleybus service on the Parque route was delayed, and test runs using trolleybuses along the route (after reinstatement of some wiring removed for road construction) only started in October 2018. Trolleybus service resumed on 2 January 2019 – operating only on the Parque route, as planned, and ultimately, only eight of the 12 Materfers returned to service. Due to technical issues, by February 2021 only two Materfer trolleybuses remained operational and trolleybus service was discontinued.

== Lines ==
At its peak, the system had six lines:

- 1 – Parque (Park): A large one-way loop that includes Avenida Boulogne Sur Mer (including the 'Portones', the entry to the General San Martín Park), the city center (Avenida 9 de Julio and Avenida Colón) and Avenida Aristides Villanueva
- 2 – Villa Nueva: Connecting the city center with the Villa Nueva district, to the east, in Guaymallén Department
- 3 – Dorrego: Connecting the city center with the Dorrego district, in Guaymallén
- 4 – Pellegrini: From the city center to Barrio San Martín, to the northwest, via Calle Pellegrini and other streets
- 5 – Godoy Cruz–Las Heras: connects three Mendoza's Departamentos (administrative divisions): Godoy Cruz, Capital and Las Heras, mostly along the arterial street, Avenida San Martín
- 6 – UNCuyo: Connecting the Universidad Nacional de Cuyo (UNCuyo) with the city center

== Fleet ==
=== Latest fleet ===
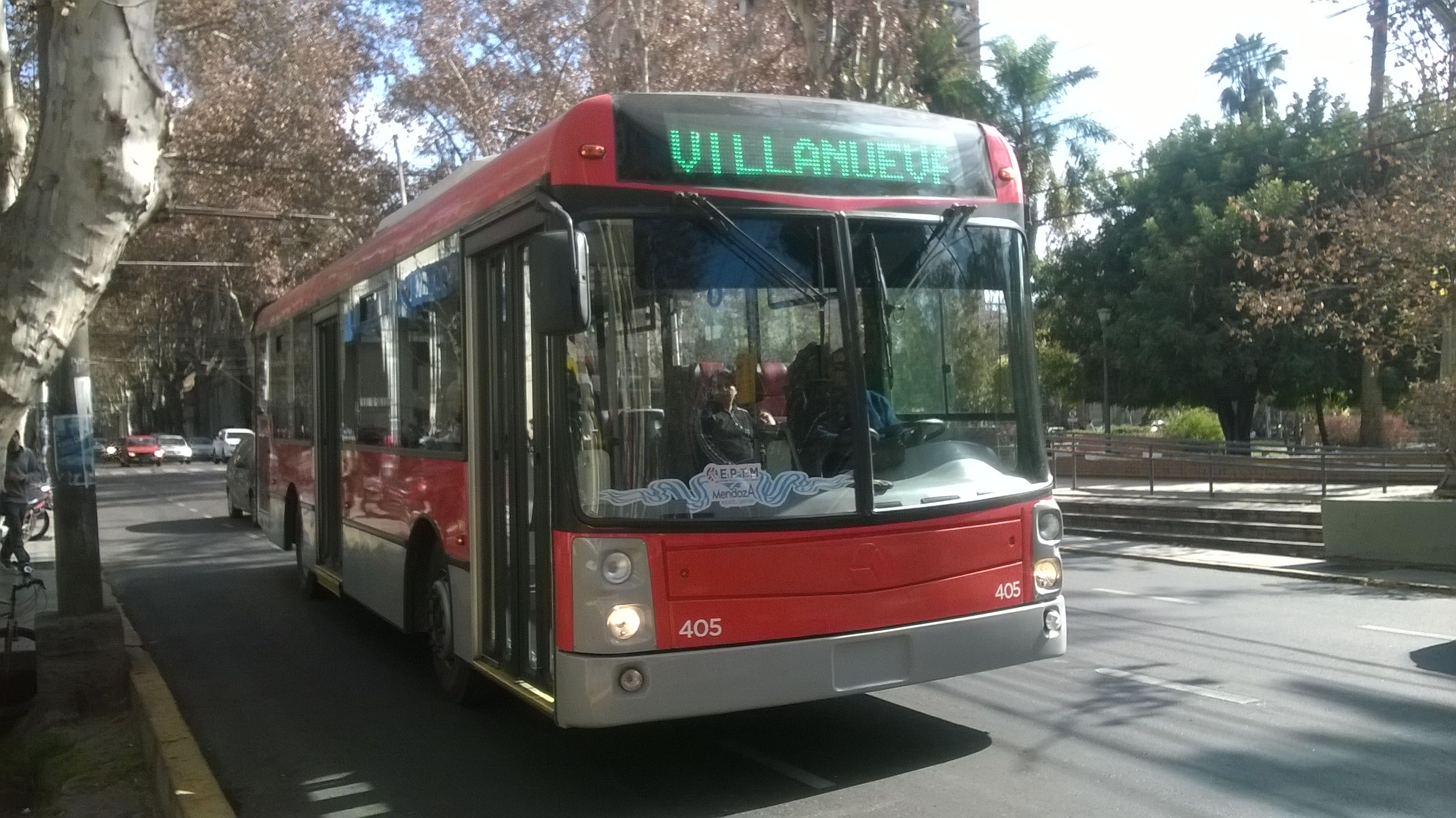
One of the new Materfer trolleybuses in 2015

In the last two years of service only Materfer trolleybuses operated on the system.

EPTM began to consider acquiring all-new trolleybuses, and ultimately partnered with Materfer, an Argentine manufacturer of railway vehicles and buses, to construct a prototype low-floor trolleybus. EPTM designed the new vehicle, and Materfer built it. It was delivered on 1 March 2013 and entered service on the Mendoza trolleybus system on 7 June 2013. Numbered 401, it was the first low-floor trolleybus built in Argentina and EPTM's first all-new trolleybus since the mid-1980s. Its body and chassis were built by Materfer, and its electrical equipment by Siemens, but the latter was replaced by equipment from Schneider Electric later in 2013. EPTM placed an order in July 2013 for 12 more Materfer/Schneider trolleybuses, and the first two were delivered in April 2014. These new trolleybuses are 11.23 metres (36 ft 10 in) long. Six Materfer trolleybuses had entered service by October 2014, numbered 401–406, and by June 2015 the number had reached eleven. The final total quantity built was 13, but the last unit (No. 413) never entered service and was cannibalized of parts to keep the others running. When the system reopened in January 2019, it ran using only eight Materfer trolleybuses.

=== Past fleet ===
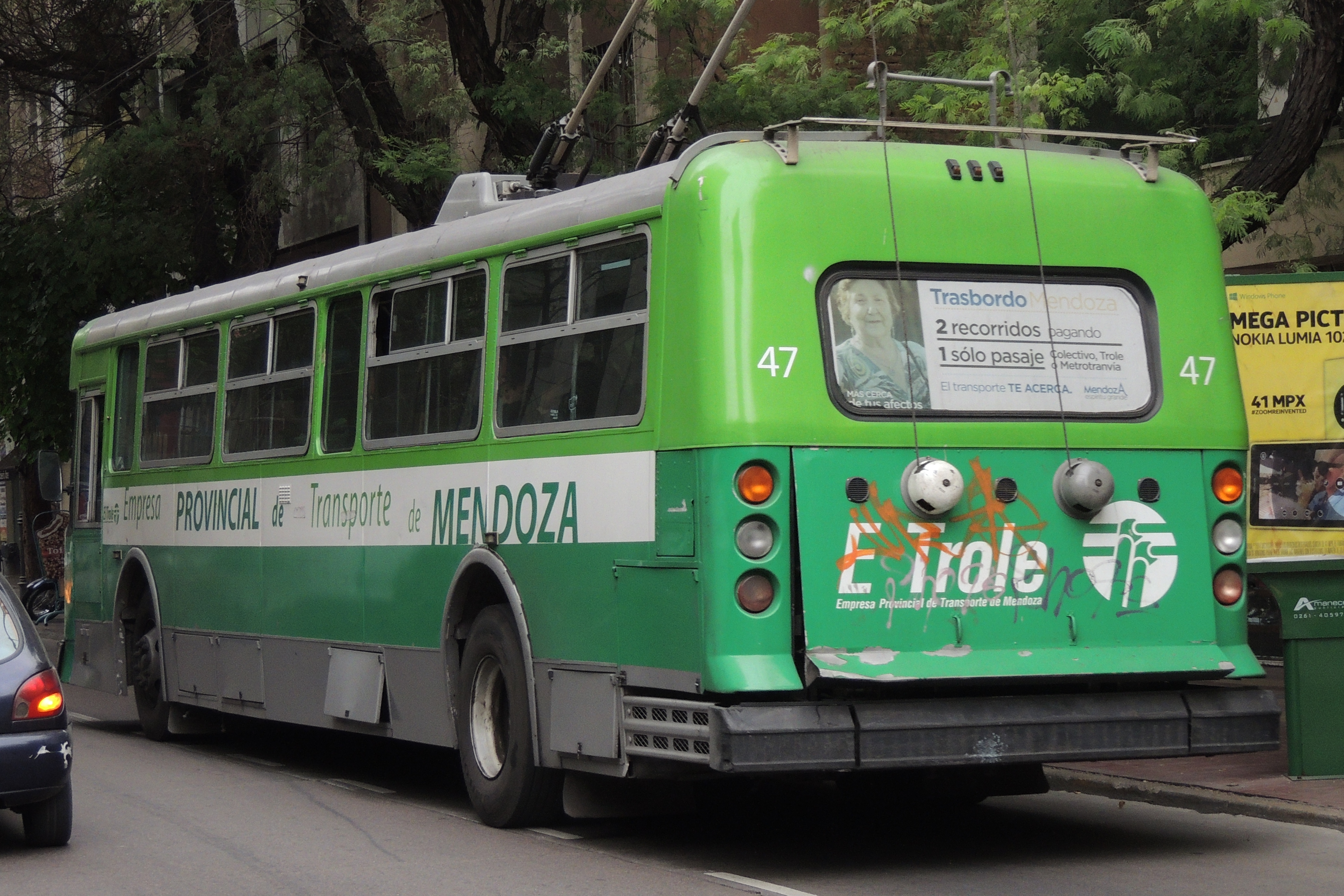
The Vancouver Flyer trolleybuses were repainted in Mendoza and re-lettered with EPTM's name and "El Trole" branding. Two-tone green was only one of five livery variations given to the ex-Vancouver vehicles.

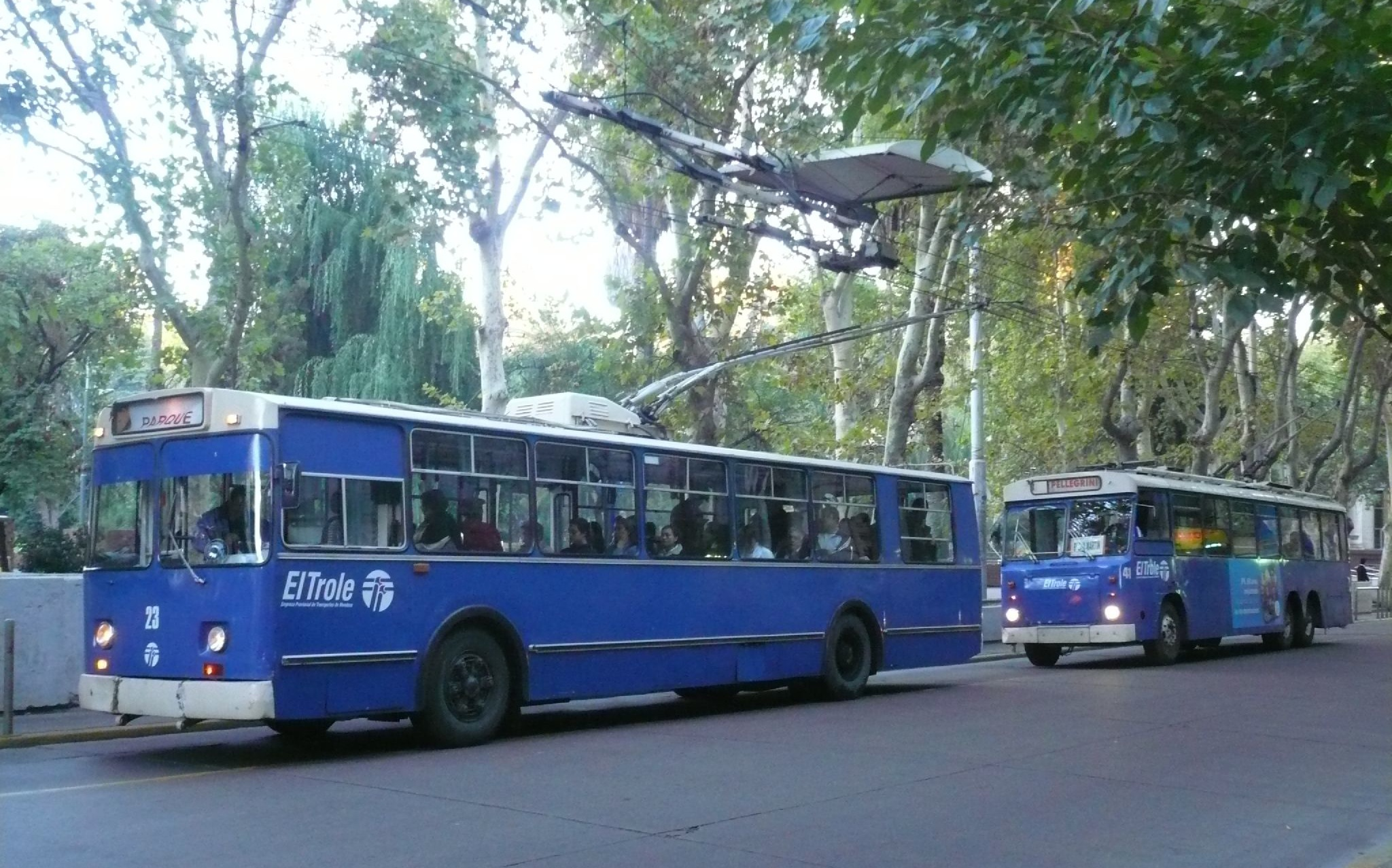
Russian-built ZIU trolleybus and ex-Solingen trolleybus in the city center in 2008

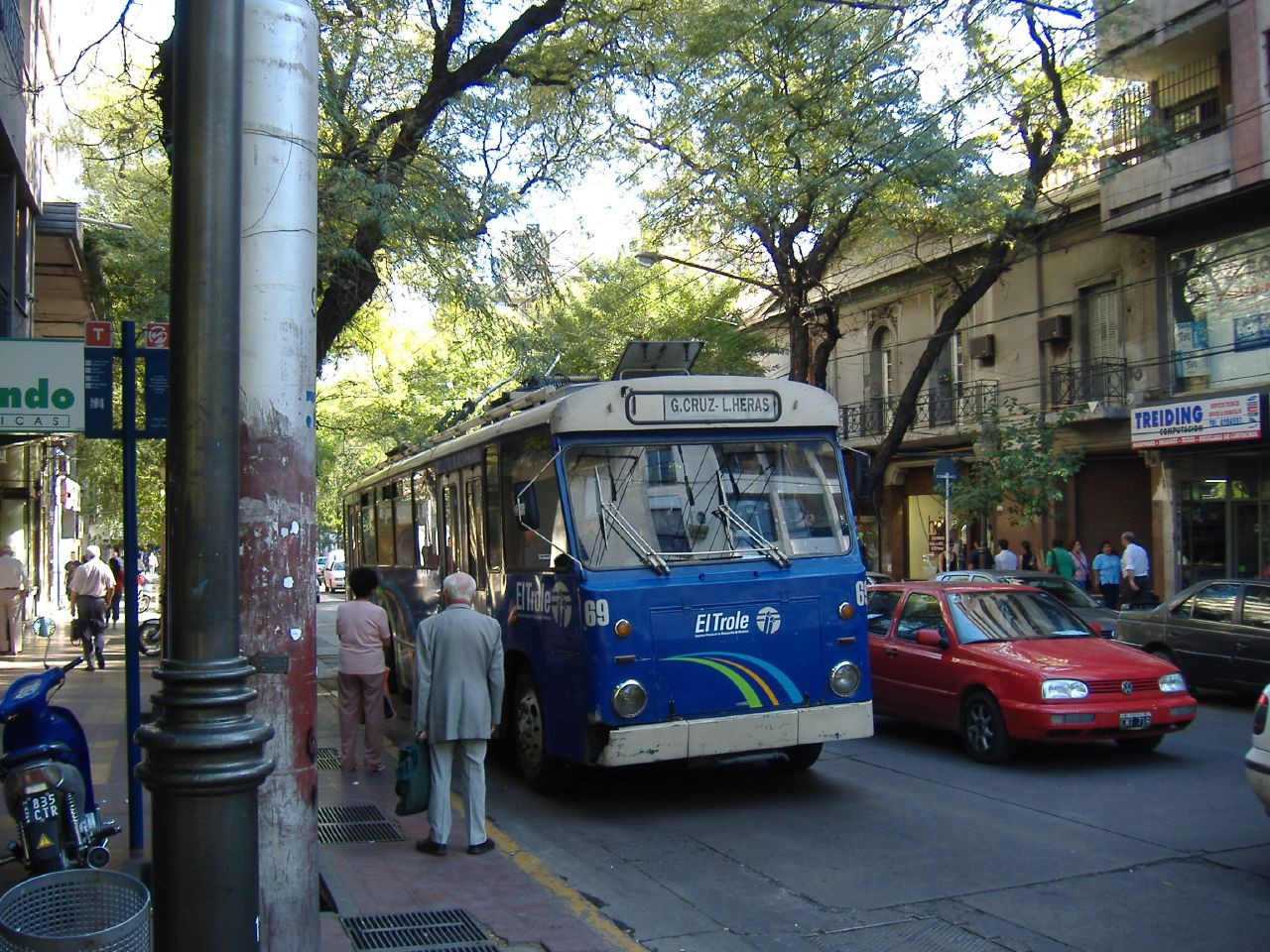
An ex-Solingen TS trolleybus in 2007

Mendoza's initial trolleybuses were a fleet of Mercedes-Benz units bought secondhand from the Buenos Aires trolleybus system, with a final total of 25 being acquired by 1960. However, these were soon replaced by a fleet of 36 Japanese Toshiba vehicles, built new in 1962. All of the Mercedes-Benz trolleybuses were already retired by the end of 1963.

In 1984, the system acquired 17 new ZIU-9 trolleybuses from the Russian Uritsky factory. In 1988, EPTM began replacing the remaining Toshiba vehicles with secondhand trolleybuses that had previously operated on the Solingen trolleybus system in Germany. EPTM acquired 78 of these German trolleybuses, known as Trolleybus Solingen (TS) buses and, in stages over the next several years, put 58 of them back into service.

The remaining 20 TS vehicles were used initially as spare parts donors. However, due to a network expansion in about 2005, even more TS vehicles were reactivated. All of the TS trolleybuses originally kept their Solingen fleet numbers, except with a "0" added before the fleet number in the case of two units whose Solingen numbers were the same as the number of a still-active ZIU trolleybus. However, at the beginning of 1996 they were renumbered into a new, continuous series. In 1997 they were reliveried in blue. Due to their German origins, they were also known in Argentina as los alemanes (the Germans). TS vehicle no. 37 was given a special task. For a time, it was used for tourist sightseeing tours, with a revised interior design and a special livery.

The last five serviceable ZIU trolleybuses were retired in January 2009 and were sold in September to the Córdoba trolleybus system.

From April 2009, Mendoza's TS trolleybuses were successively replaced. By early March 2010, there were only eleven TS vehicles still in use. Their final operating day was 1 May 2010. A German group, the Obus-Museum Solingen e. V., helped to secure the return of one of the TS trolleybuses to Germany, for preservation. No. 51 (ex-Solingen 68) was chosen in 2011, and it was transported back to Solingen in 2014. Another TS trolleybus, No. 80 (ex-Solingen 10) was acquired by the Obus-Museum Solingen and left Mendoza for Germany in October 2019.

==== Vancouver Flyer buses ====
The replacements for the TS vehicles were 80 secondhand Flyer E901A/E902 vehicles from the Vancouver trolleybus system in Canada, which were built in the early 1980s. They began to arrive during December 2008, and all 80 had arrived by February 2009. After being refurbished, repainted and renumbered in Mendoza, they began to enter service on 30 April 2009. By June 2010, 60 had been refurbished and repainted, and 40 had entered service. The repainting involved five different liveries, all with the colours laid out in the same pattern, with each version given to 12 vehicles (in the first 60). They were renumbered from their four-digit Vancouver fleet numbers into the series 01–60.

The Flyer vehicles were intended to allow the EPTM to improve trolleybus services, and to operate extensions of new lines that were already in service. However, by 2011, EPTM had already begun to experience problems maintaining the Flyers, due in part to their age (about 30 years) and in part also to the loss, during shipment, of maintenance manuals and a crate of spare parts shipped from Canada in 2009. In December 2011, more than one-third of the Flyer trolleybuses were reported to be out of service due to chronic maintenance problems.

In 2017, after all trolleybus service was temporarily suspended, EPTM announced that the ex-Vancouver Flyer trolleybuses would not return to service when the system reopens, only the Materfer vehicles. The last use of any Flyers took place in May 2017. Although the last 17 Flyers were sold for scrap in April 2018, some were bought by private individuals and at least three are known to still exist mostly intact (Nos. 35, 48, 59).

== See also ==
- List of trolleybus systems
- Metrotranvía of Mendoza
