= Club Atlético Engranaje =

Argentine football club

Engranaje
- Full name: Club Atlético Engranaje
- Nickname(s): Mecánico
- Founded: August 4, 1954
- Ground: Villa Sol, Concepción del Uruguay, Entre Ríos Province, Argentina
- League: Liga de fútbol de Concepción del Uruguay
Home colours	Away colours

Club Atlético Engranaje, known simply as Engranaje, is an Argentine football club located in Concepción del Uruguay, Entre Ríos Province. The team currently plays in the Liga de fútbol de Concepción del Uruguay.

The club was founded on August 4, 1954, by staff, students and graduates of the local vocational school Escuela de Aprendices. The peculiar name of the club comes from the Spanish word for gear, an important element in mechanical engineering.

== See also ==
- List of football clubs in Argentina
- Argentine football league system
