= Gualeguay, Entre Ríos =

Gualeguay
- City
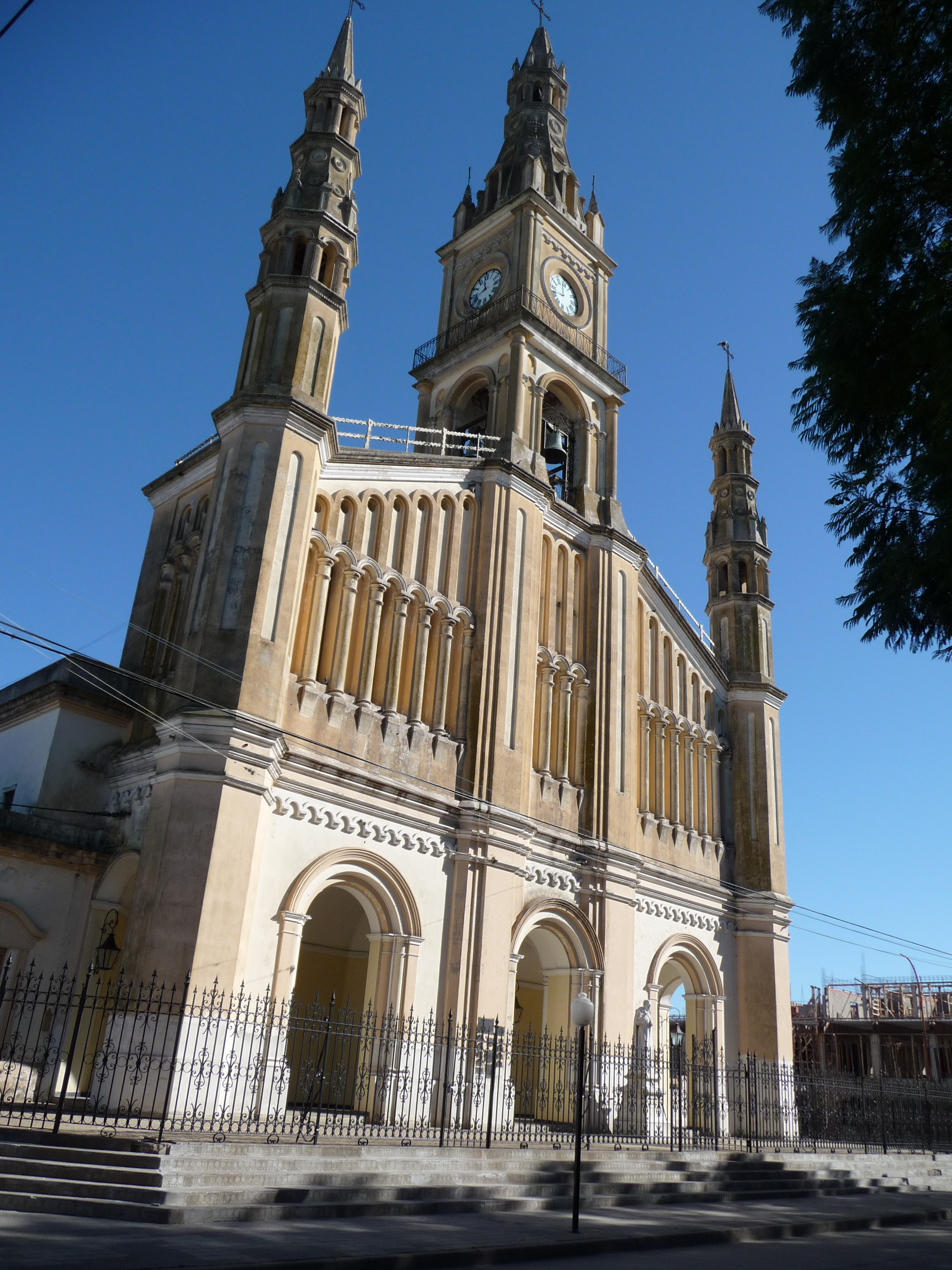
- San Antonio Church

- Location of Gualeguay in Argentina
- Coordinates: 33°9′S 59°20′W
- Country: Argentina
- Province: Entre Ríos
- Department: Gualeguay

Government
  - Intendant: Dora Bogdan (UCR)

Population (2010 census)
  - Total: 40,507
- Time zone: UTC−3 (ART)
- CPA base: E2840
- Dialing code: +54 3444

Gualeguay is a city in the province of Entre Ríos, Argentina, on the Gualeguay River, about 226 km from the provincial capital Paraná and 234 km north-west from Buenos Aires. It has a population of about 39,000 inhabitants as per the 2001 census [INDEC]. It should not be confused with Gualeguaychú (another city, 86 km away).

Gualeguay was founded on March 20, 1783, by a military surveyor, Tomás de Rocamora, sent by the Viceroy of the Río de la Plata, Juan José de Vértiz y Salcedo. Rocamora was also the official founder of Gualeguaychú and Concepción del Uruguay and the one who named the province Entre Ríos ("Between Rivers"). The new village received the name of San Antonio de Gualeguay because it was under the protection of St. Anthony.

Gualeguay was the birthplace of post-impressionist painter Cesáreo Bernaldo de Quirós and anthropologist Juan Bautista Ambrosetti (both among the best-known Argentines in their fields), as well as Jorge Burruchaga, a football player and manager and scorer of the winning goal in the 1986 FIFA World Cup final and Fernando Ayala, a major Argentine cinema director and producer. Notable actress and comedian Beatriz Bonnet was born in Gualeguay as well. Lisandro Martínez, centre-back for Manchester United F.C., who won the World Cup with Argentina in 2022, was born in the city in 1998.

Paris Boys Choir

On July 24, 2023, the members of The Paris Boys Choir Petits chanteurs de Sainte-Croix de Neuilly (Los Niños Cantores de París) are made honorary citizens of the city by the municipal council. They give two concerts on this occasion.
