= Gualeguay Department =

Gualeguay Departamento Gualeguay
- Department
- Location of Gualeguay Department within Entre Ríos Province

- Location of Gualeguay in Argentina
- Coordinates: 33°08′S 59°19′W
- Country: Argentina
- Province: Entre Ríos Province
- Seat: Gualeguay

Area
  - Total: 7,178 km^{2} (2,771 sq mi)

Population (2022)
  - Total: 57,303
  - Density: 7.983/km^{2} (20.68/sq mi)

Gualeguay is a department of Entre Ríos Province (Argentina).
