= Uruguay Department =

Uruguay Department Departamento Uruguay
- Department
- Location of Uruguay Department within Entre Ríos Province

- Location of Uruguay in Argentina
- Coordinates: 33°1′S 58°31′W
- Country: Argentina
- Province: Entre Ríos
- Head town: Concepción del Uruguay

Area
  - Total: 5,855 km^{2} (2,261 sq mi)

Population (2022)
  - Total: 116,356
  - Density: 19.87/km^{2} (51.47/sq mi)
- Time zone: UTC-3 (ART)

The Uruguay Department (in Spanish, Departamento Uruguay) is an administrative subdivision (departamento) of the province of Entre Ríos, Argentina. It is located in the south-east of the province, beside the Uruguay River.

The head town is Concepción del Uruguay.
