= Concepción del Uruguay =

- City
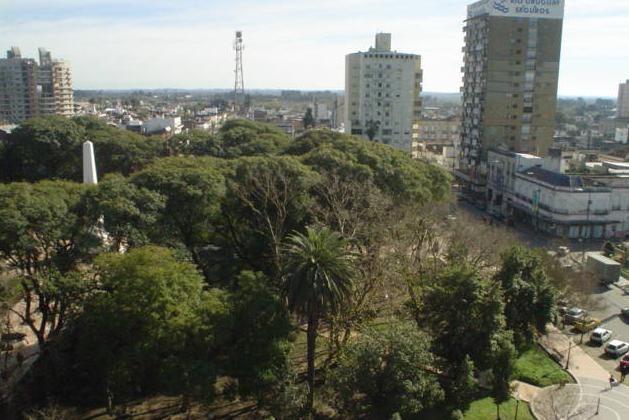
- View of Ramírez Square

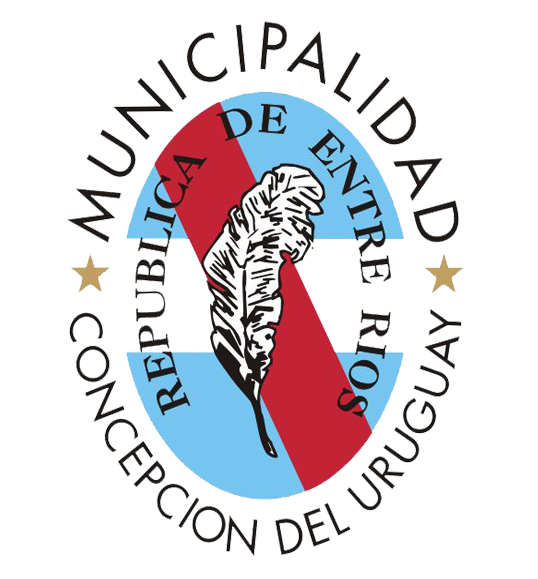
- Coat of arms

- Location of Concepción del Uruguay in Argentina
- Coordinates: 32°29′S 58°14′W
- Country: Argentina
- Province: Entre Ríos
- Department: Uruguay
- Foundation: June 25, 1783
- Founder: Tomás de Rocamora

Government
  - Mayor: José E. Lauritto (Justicialist Party)

Population (2010 census)
  - Total: 72,528
- Demonym: Uruguayense
- Time zone: UTC−3 (ART)
- CPA base: E3260
- Dialing code: +54 3442

Concepción del Uruguay is a city in Argentina.

It is located in the Entre Ríos province, on the western shore of the Uruguay River, some 320 kilometers (200 mi) north of Buenos Aires. Its population is about 80,000 inhabitants (2001 census [INDEC]).

== History ==
The city was founded on June 25, 1783, by Tomás de Rocamora. Rich in ancient monuments, it is sometimes referred to as La Histórica ("The Historical") due to is role in the national formation process. The Palacio San José, the former personal residence of caudillo Justo José de Urquiza, is located only 23 km (14 mi) from Concepción.

=== Background ===
A populated area known as Arroyo de China (which had no foundation), was recorded in approximately 1778 and located north of the namesake creek in what are now the neighborhoods of Puerto Viejo and La Concepción in the extreme south of the city. The same year the first chapel was erected at a place that would subsequently be used as a cemetery.

=== Foundation ===
Commissioned by the viceroy of Vértiz and Juan José Salcedo, Thomas Rocamora founded the town of "Our Lady of the Immaculate Conception of Uruguay" on 25 June 1783, bringing the first town north of the existing population to what is now the administrative and commercial centre of the city.

There are discussions about the full name of the city, as some versions say it was merely "Concepción del Uruguay".

=== Epicentre of the national scene ===
In 1810, aware of the movement that had been raised in Buenos Aires, the city was the first to join the cause of the Revolution.

In 1814 the Supreme Director Gervasio Antonio Posadas, using the extraordinary powers given by the Constituent Assembly, named Concepción del Uruguay as the capital of the province of Entre Ríos at the time of its creation.

On June 29, 1815, General José Gervasio Artigas convened the first congress independence, which was held in the city with the name of Congress East. It was meant for the declaration of independence Argentina and the adoption of the flag created by Belgrano straddles the currency punzó-red diagonal stripe symbolizing federalism.

It was also decided not to attend Congress of Tucumán that was to be held the following year, as a sign of protest toward Directory (unit) to promote the Portuguese invasion in Banda Oriental and attacks on federal deputies.

On February 1, 1820, General Francisco Ramírez, allied with the governor of Santa Fe Estanislao López, who commanded the federal army defeated José Rondeau at the battle of Cepeda, shortly after signing the Treaty of Pilar. Subsequently, Ramírez was distanced from López and September 29 of that year, proclaimed the Republic of Entre Ríos, which included addition to the existing provinces of Corrientes and Misiones, Concepción being the capital of Uruguay. But the life of this republic would be short-lived, since they would disband with the death of Ramírez on July 10, 1821.

In 1826, General Justo José de Urquiza, in his role as the governor of Entre Rios, promoted the law that gave Concepción del Uruguay range city.

In 1848 Urquiza created the Colegio del Uruguay, the first in the country to be of secular character.

In 1851, at the foot of the pyramid's central Plaza, General Francisco Ramirez, the pronouncement of Urquiza took place against Juan Manuel de Rosas, an act that would lead to the battle of Caseros on February 3, 1852, in which Urquiza was the winner and which paved the way for enactment of the National Constitution the following year. Also in 1852, troops from Buenos Aires led by General Madariaga disembark frustrated with the aim of taking the city.

The Provincial Convention gathered in the city in 1860 to punish the provincial Constitution again declare the provincial capital, which would function until the year of the centennial, 1883, when the capital was finally moved to the city of Paraná.

On January 1, 1873, the town was formally created. Also the same year, during the boom of normalcy, Sarmiento created in the city the second Normal School in the country, after the first of Paraná and women.

=== Late 19th and early 20th centuries ===
June 30, 1887 was enabled the rail link across the line which is then integrated into the General Urquiza Rail with the cities of Paraná, Nogoyá and Rosario del Tala. Also that year was reformed port, which in 1910 reached their best time from his office be one of the most important country.

=== Industrial development ===
Throughout the twentieth century, the city continued to hold importance to cultural and economic level, adding to the processes of industrialization underway in the country and settling their major industries.

In 1994, the swearing of the Constitutional Reform was held at the Palacio San José.

== Geography ==
The city is located in the Entre Ríos province, on the western shore of the Uruguay River, some 320 kilometers (200 mi) north of Buenos Aires.

=== Climate ===
Climate data for Concepción del Uruguay (1981–2010)
Month	Jan	Feb	Mar	Apr	May	Jun	Jul	Aug	Sep	Oct	Nov	Dec	Year
Record high °C (°F)	40.4 (104.7)	38.1 (100.6)	38.0 (100.4)	35.3 (95.5)	32.9 (91.2)	27.9 (82.2)	30.8 (87.4)	33.6 (92.5)	36.8 (98.2)	37.9 (100.2)	37.6 (99.7)	40.4 (104.7)	40.4 (104.7)
Mean daily maximum °C (°F)	31.1 (88.0)	29.6 (85.3)	28.0 (82.4)	23.7 (74.7)	20.2 (68.4)	17.2 (63.0)	16.8 (62.2)	19.2 (66.6)	20.7 (69.3)	23.9 (75.0)	26.6 (79.9)	29.4 (84.9)	23.9 (75.0)
Daily mean °C (°F)	24.7 (76.5)	23.5 (74.3)	21.8 (71.2)	17.8 (64.0)	14.3 (57.7)	11.5 (52.7)	11.0 (51.8)	12.9 (55.2)	14.6 (58.3)	17.9 (64.2)	20.7 (69.3)	23.0 (73.4)	17.8 (64.1)
Mean daily minimum °C (°F)	18.5 (65.3)	17.9 (64.2)	16.2 (61.2)	12.5 (54.5)	9.1 (48.4)	6.6 (43.9)	5.9 (42.6)	7.1 (44.8)	8.7 (47.7)	11.9 (53.4)	14.5 (58.1)	16.8 (62.2)	12.1 (53.9)
Record low °C (°F)	8.0 (46.4)	7.3 (45.1)	5.3 (41.5)	0.5 (32.9)	−3.3 (26.1)	−4.2 (24.4)	−4.8 (23.4)	−4.1 (24.6)	−4.3 (24.3)	−0.8 (30.6)	2.0 (35.6)	6.7 (44.1)	−4.8 (23.4)
Average precipitation mm (inches)	109.4 (4.31)	120.8 (4.76)	123.8 (4.87)	130.3 (5.13)	88.1 (3.47)	57.6 (2.27)	49.6 (1.95)	51.4 (2.02)	66.5 (2.62)	109.7 (4.32)	112.6 (4.43)	119.9 (4.72)	1,139.7 (44.87)
Average relative humidity (%)	67	72	74	78	80	82	79	75	73	72	69	66	74
Mean monthly sunshine hours	291.4	231.7	232.5	186.0	176.7	138.0	164.3	182.9	195.0	229.4	264.0	285.2	2,577.1
Mean daily sunshine hours	9.4	8.2	7.5	6.2	5.7	4.6	5.3	5.9	6.5	7.4	8.8	9.2	7.1
Source: Instituto Nacional de Tecnología Agropecuaria

== Uruguayenses ==
To distinguish its citizens from Uruguayan nationals, people from Concepción del Uruguay are called uruguayenses, while Uruguayans are known as uruguayos.

== Economic life ==
Today the city has three major industries: the port, the industrial park (poultry, woods, auto-parts) and the state administration (including five faculties). The Uruguay Department produces 47% of the nation's poultry, and Concepción del Uruguay together with Gualeguay and Colón make up 85% of Argentine chicken exports.

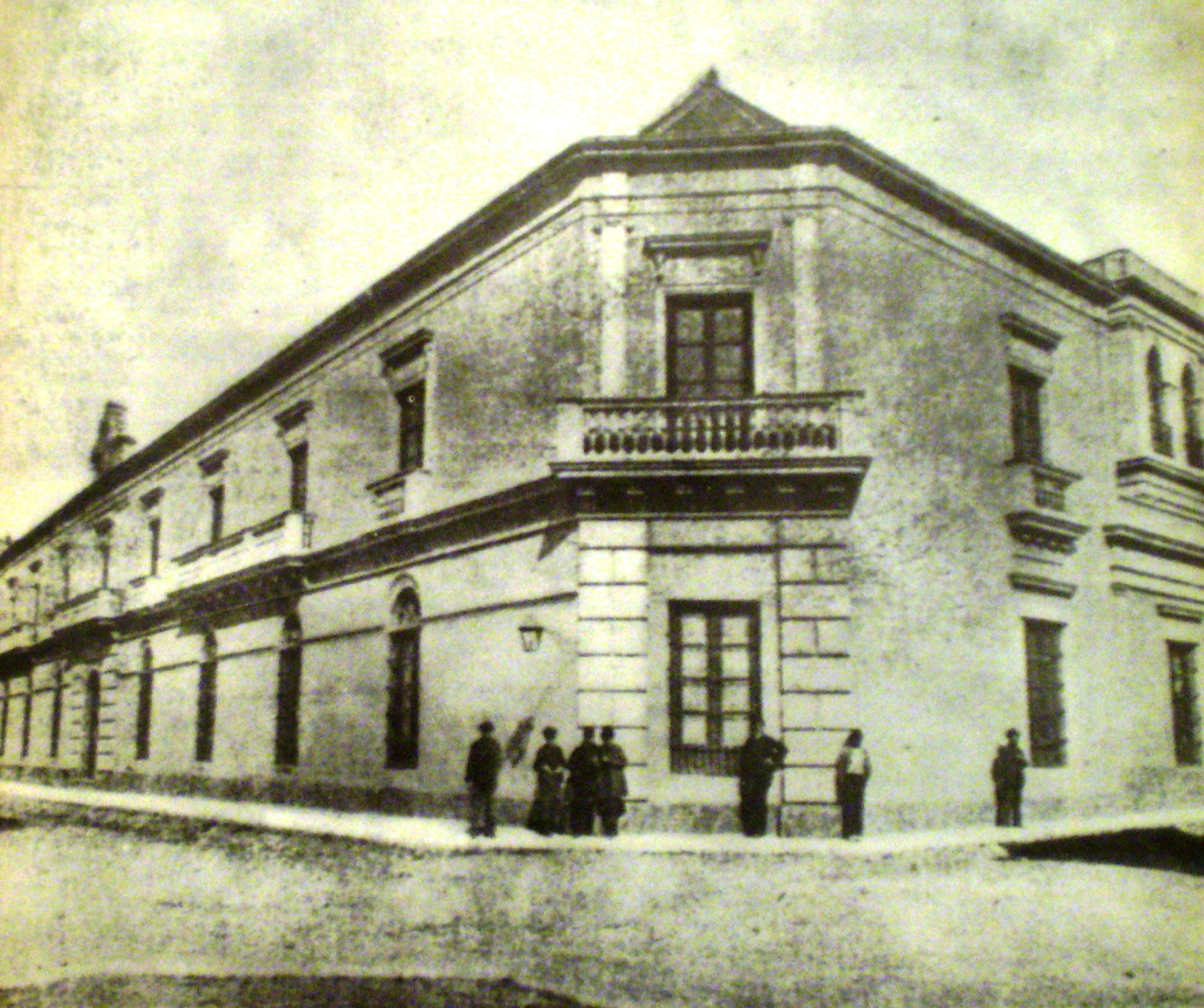
Secondary school, c. 1900

== Education ==
The city has four universities, of which three are public (two national and one provincial) and the other one is private. They totalled ten faculties, thereby providing a broad academic offerings in different areas. In turn, two of the aforementioned institutions have headquarters in the city of his rectory, confirming its importance as the largest educational center in the region.

Amongst the city's secondary schools is the historical Colegio del Uruguay, where many of Argentina and Paraguay's presidents studied.

== Sports ==
- Club Atlético Engranaje, football club

== Notable people ==
- Mohamed Alí Seineldín (1933-2009) soldier
- Domingo Santo Liotta (1924-2022) cardiologist
- José Chamot (1969-) footballer
