= Alta Italia station =

Metrotranvía Mendoza station

Alta Italia station Parador Alta Italia
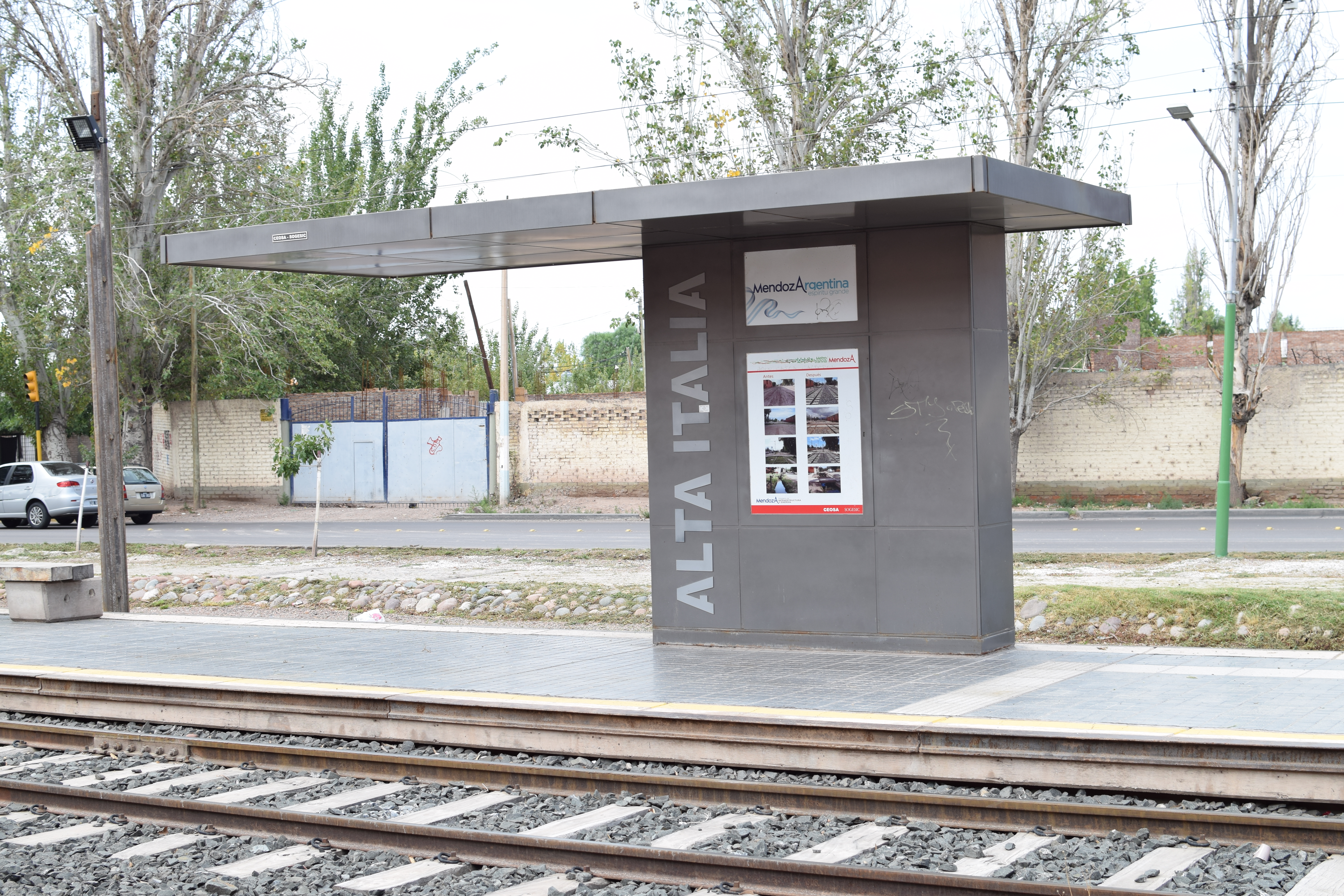

General information
- Location: General Gutiérrez, Mendoza; Argentina
- Coordinates: 32.954895°S 68.795326°W
- Transit authority: Sociedad de Transporte Mendoza
- Platforms: 2 side platforms
- Tracks: 2

History
- Opened: 28 February 2012

Services
| Preceding station | STM | Following station |
|---|---|---|
| Maza towards General Gutiérrez | Metrotranvía Mendoza | Piedra Buena towards Avellaneda |

Alta Italia is a light rail station located on the intersection of Alta Italia and Hipólito Yrigoyen Streets in the town of General Gutiérrez, Maipú Department, Mendoza Province, Argentina. The station opened on 28 February 2012, as part of Metrotranvía Mendoza.

== Images ==
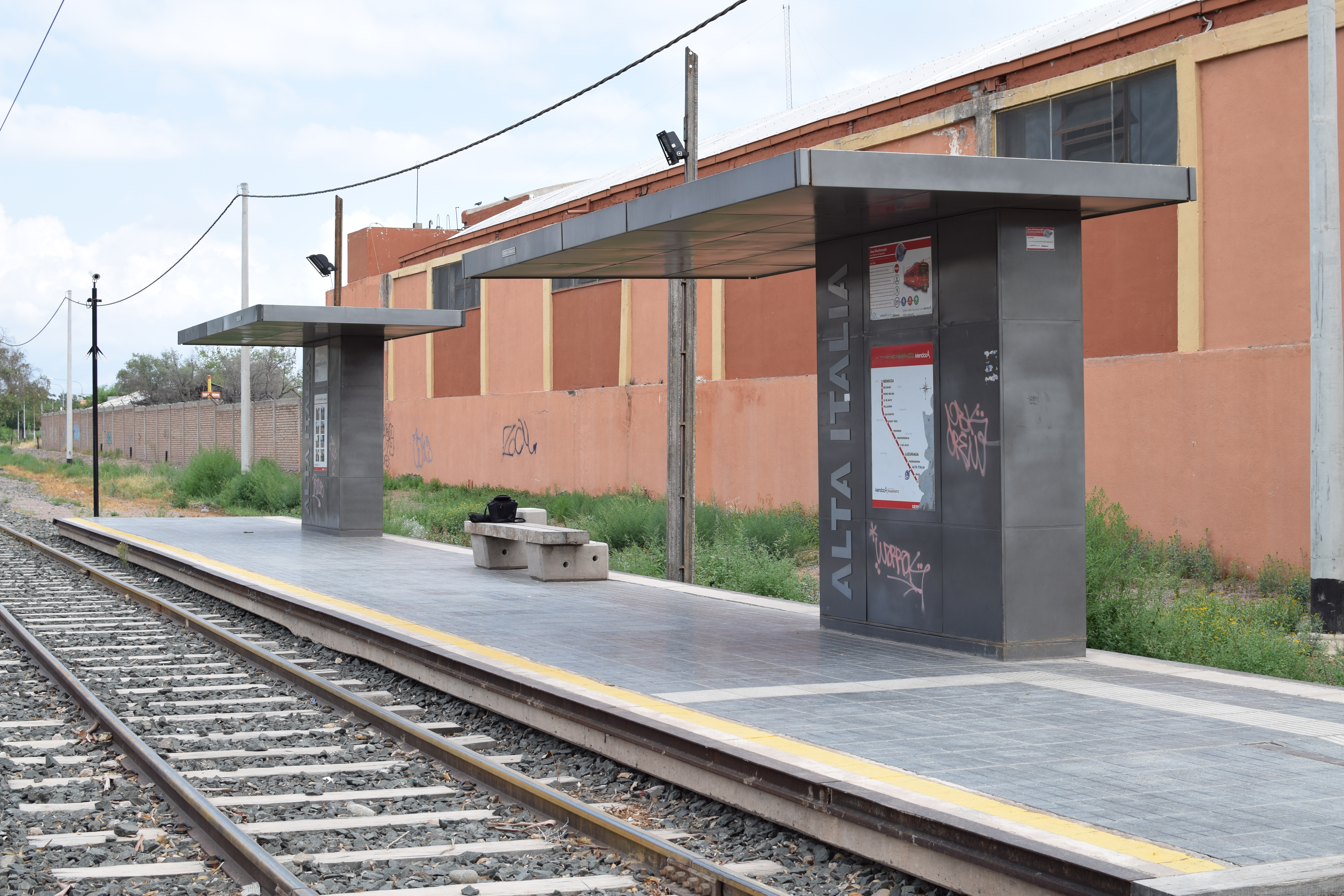

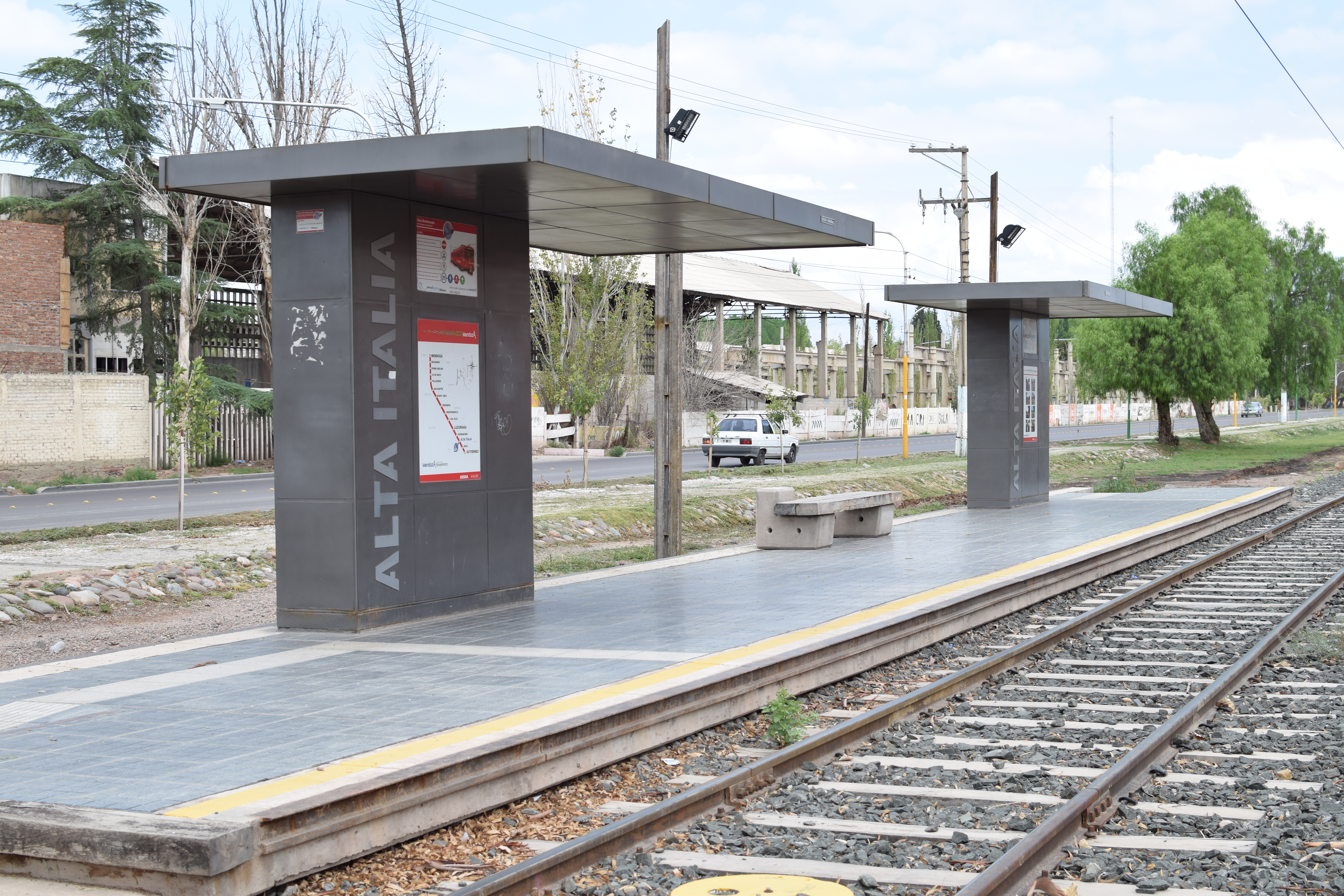
