= Piedra Buena station =

Metrotranvía Mendoza station

Piedrabuena station Parador Piedrabuena
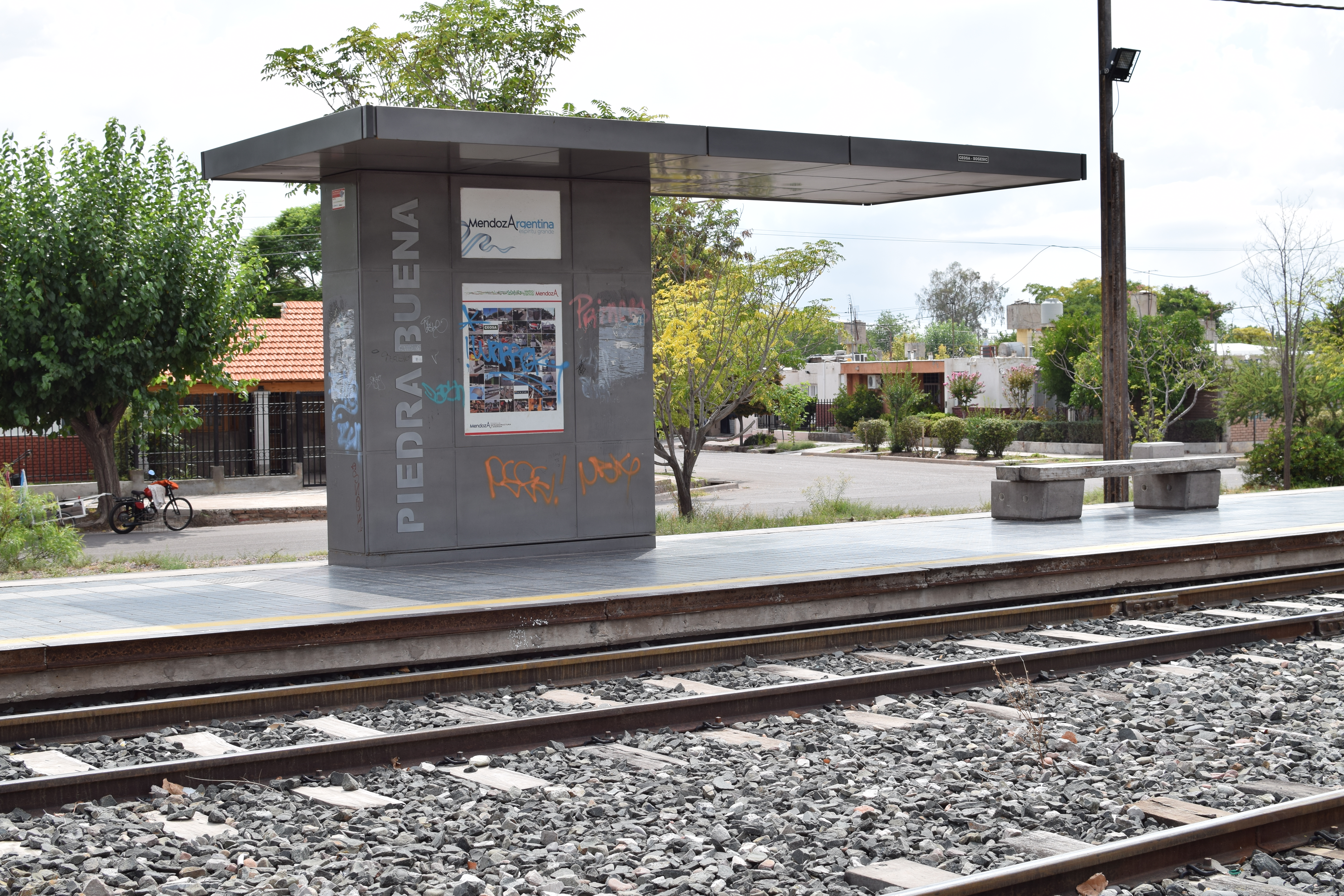

General information
- Location: General Gutiérrez, Mendoza; Argentina
- Coordinates: 32.952558°S 68.801140°W
- Transit authority: Sociedad de Transporte Mendoza
- Lines: Metrotranvía Mendoza (passenger); General San Martín Railway (freight)
- Platforms: 2 side platforms
- Tracks: 3

History
- Opened: 28 February 2012

Services
Preceding station	STM	Following station
Alta Italia towards General Gutiérrez	Metrotranvía Mendoza	Luzuriaga towards Avellaneda
Location

Piedrabuena is a station located on the intersection of Piedrabuena and Olivera Streets in the town of General Gutiérrez, Maipú Department, Mendoza Province, Argentina. The station opened on 28 February 2012, as part of Metrotranvía Mendoza.

== Images ==
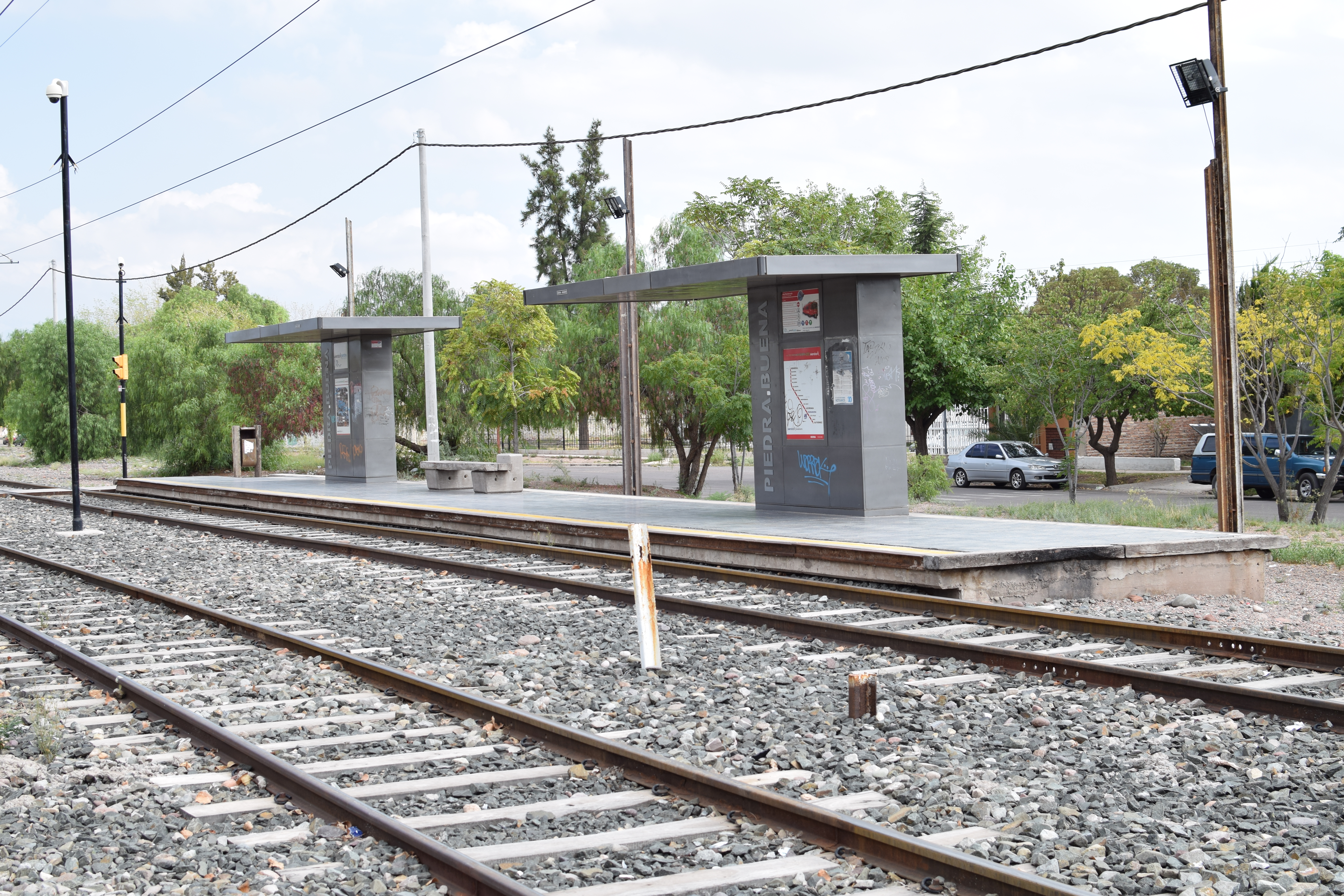

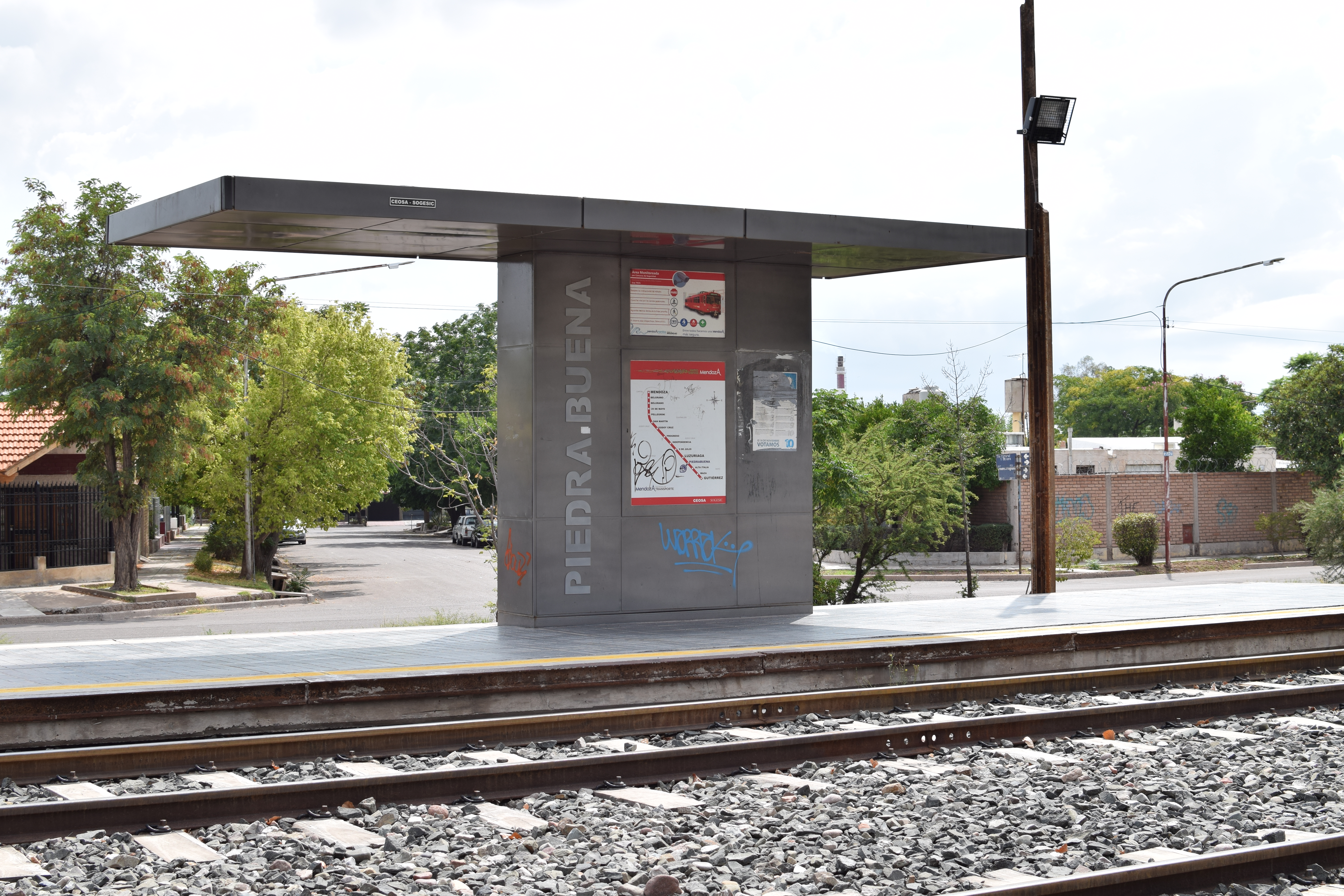
