= 9 de Julio station (Mendoza) =

Metrotranvía Mendoza station

9 de Julio station Parador 9 de Julio
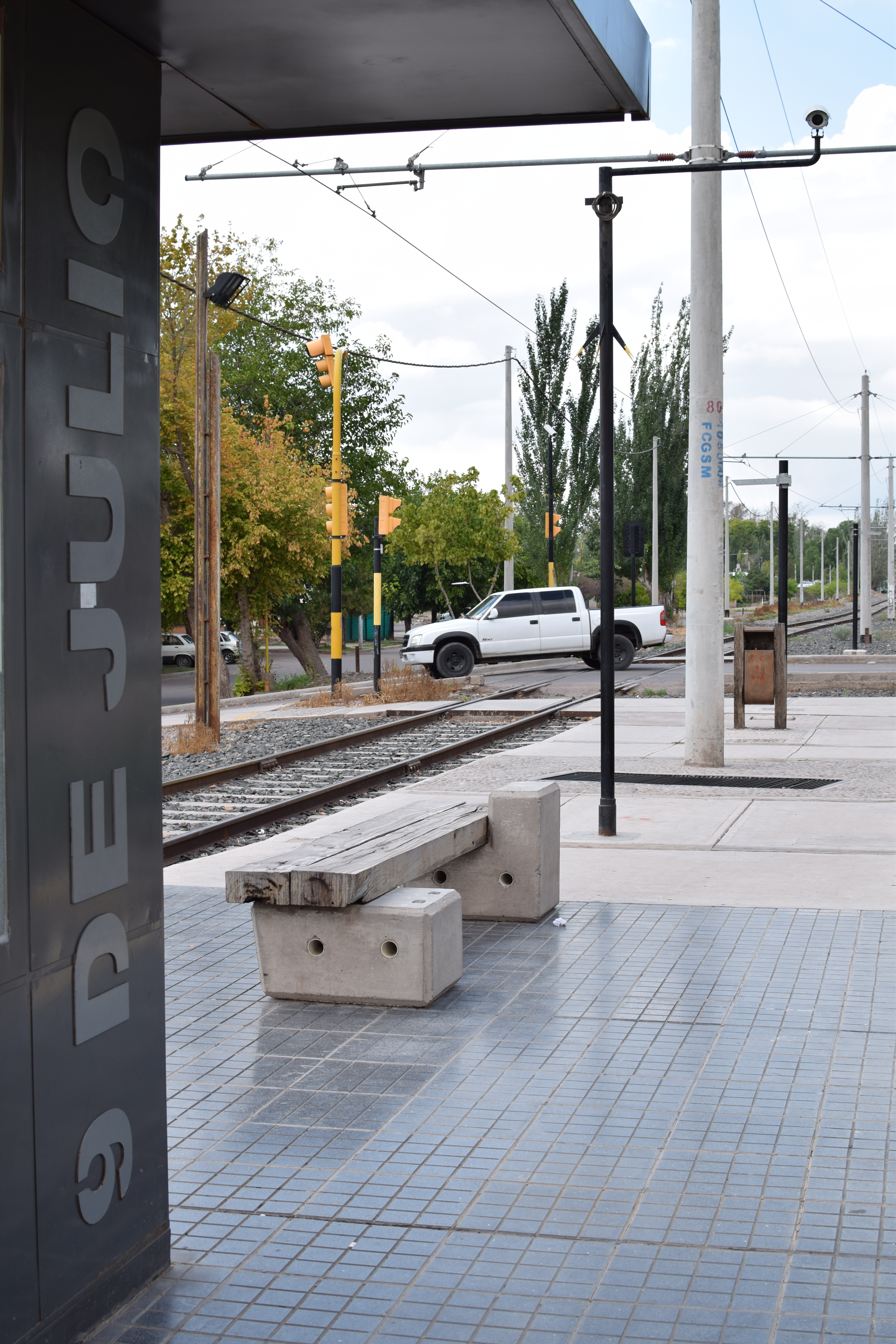

General information
- Location: Luzuriaga, Mendoza; Argentina
- Coordinates: 32.941692°S 68.815092°W
- Transit authority: Sociedad de Transporte Mendoza
- Platforms: 1 island platform
- Tracks: 2

History
- Opened: 28 February 2012

Services
Preceding station	STM	Following station
Luzuriaga towards General Gutiérrez	Metrotranvía Mendoza	Parque TIC towards Avellaneda

9 de Julio is a light rail station located on the intersection of 9 de Julio and Valle Grande Streets in Luzuriaga, a place in Maipú Department, Mendoza Province, Argentina. The station opened on 28 February 2012, as part of Metrotranvía Mendoza.

== Images ==
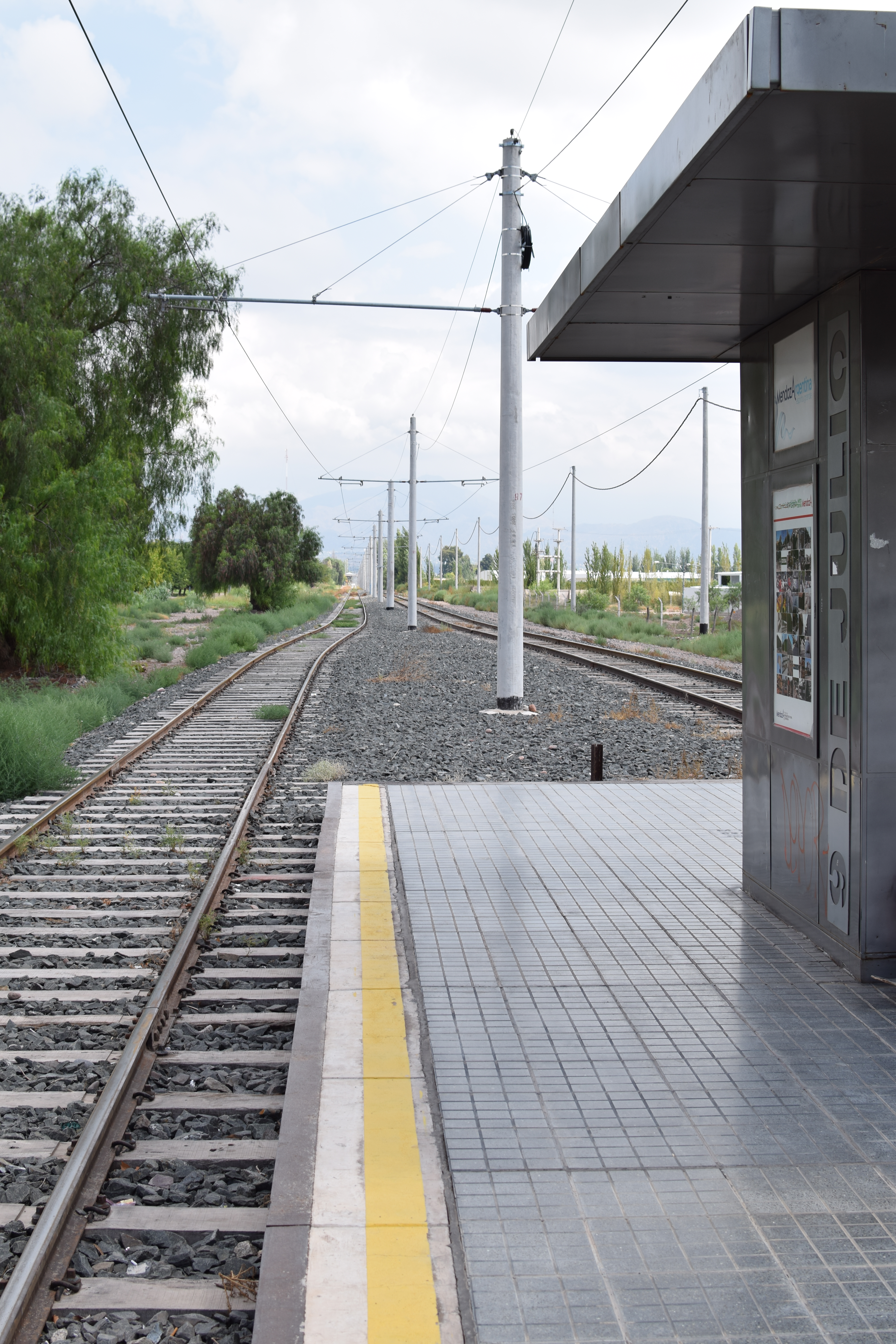

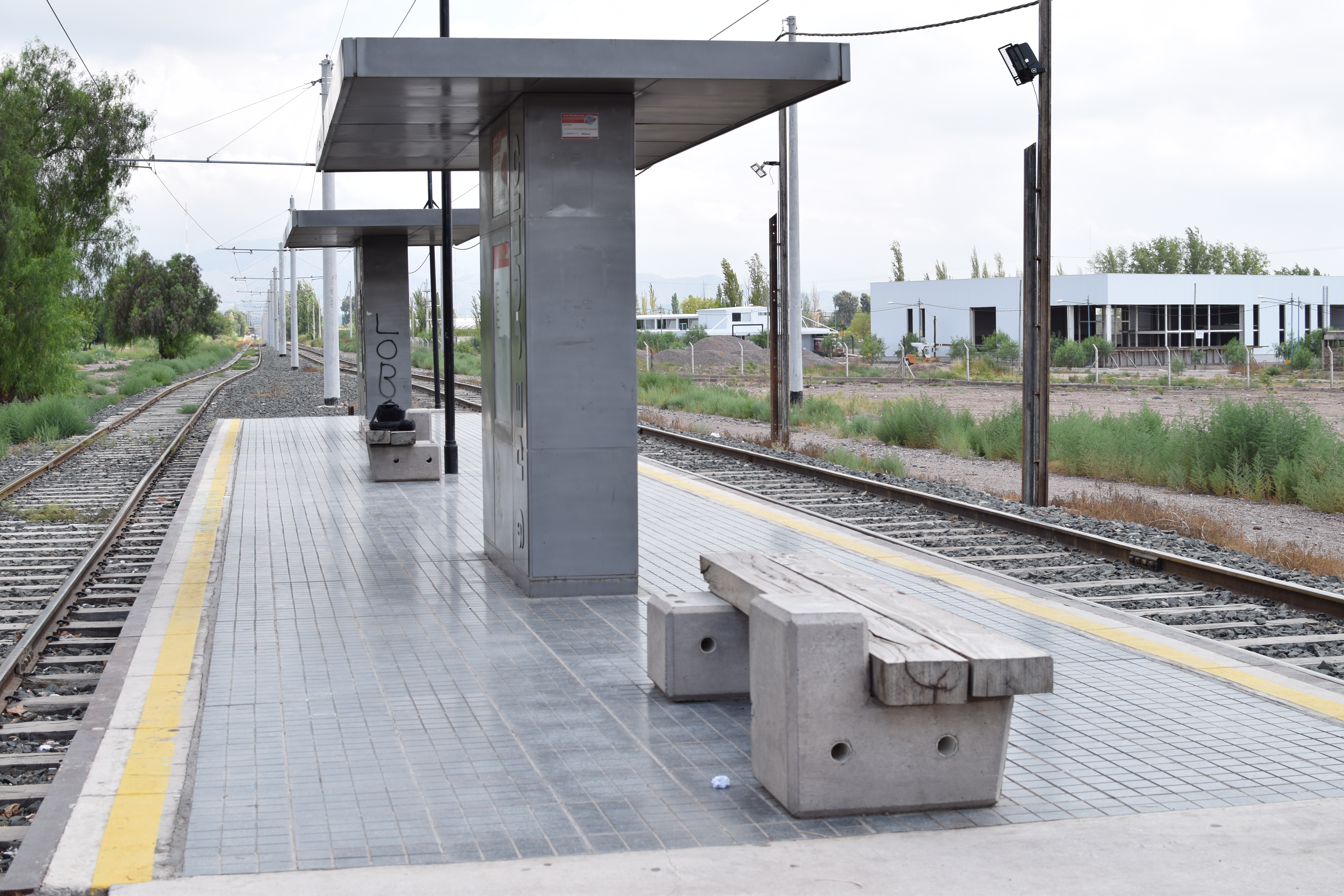

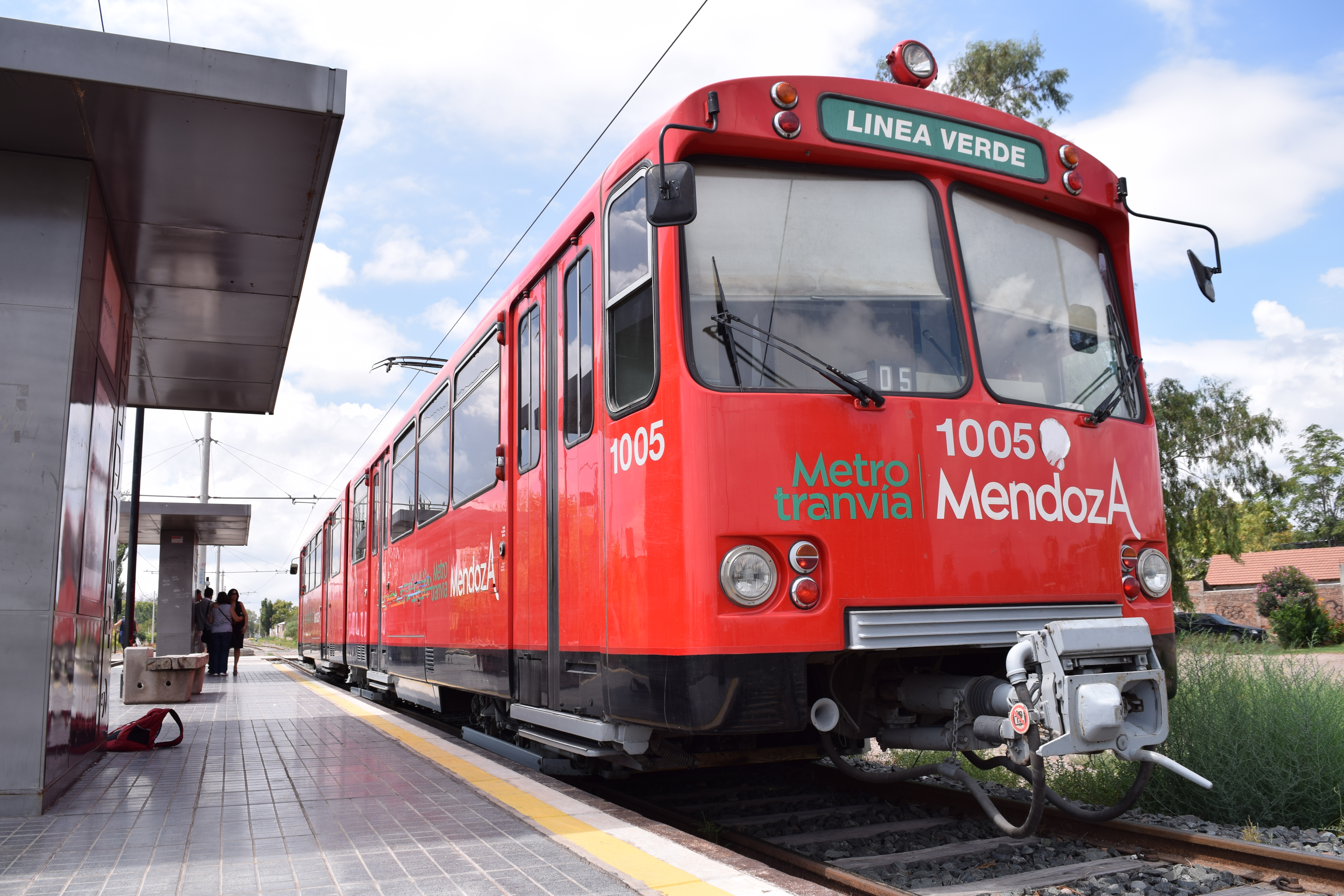
