= Luzuriaga station =

Metrotranvía Mendoza station

Luzuriaga station Parador Luzuriaga
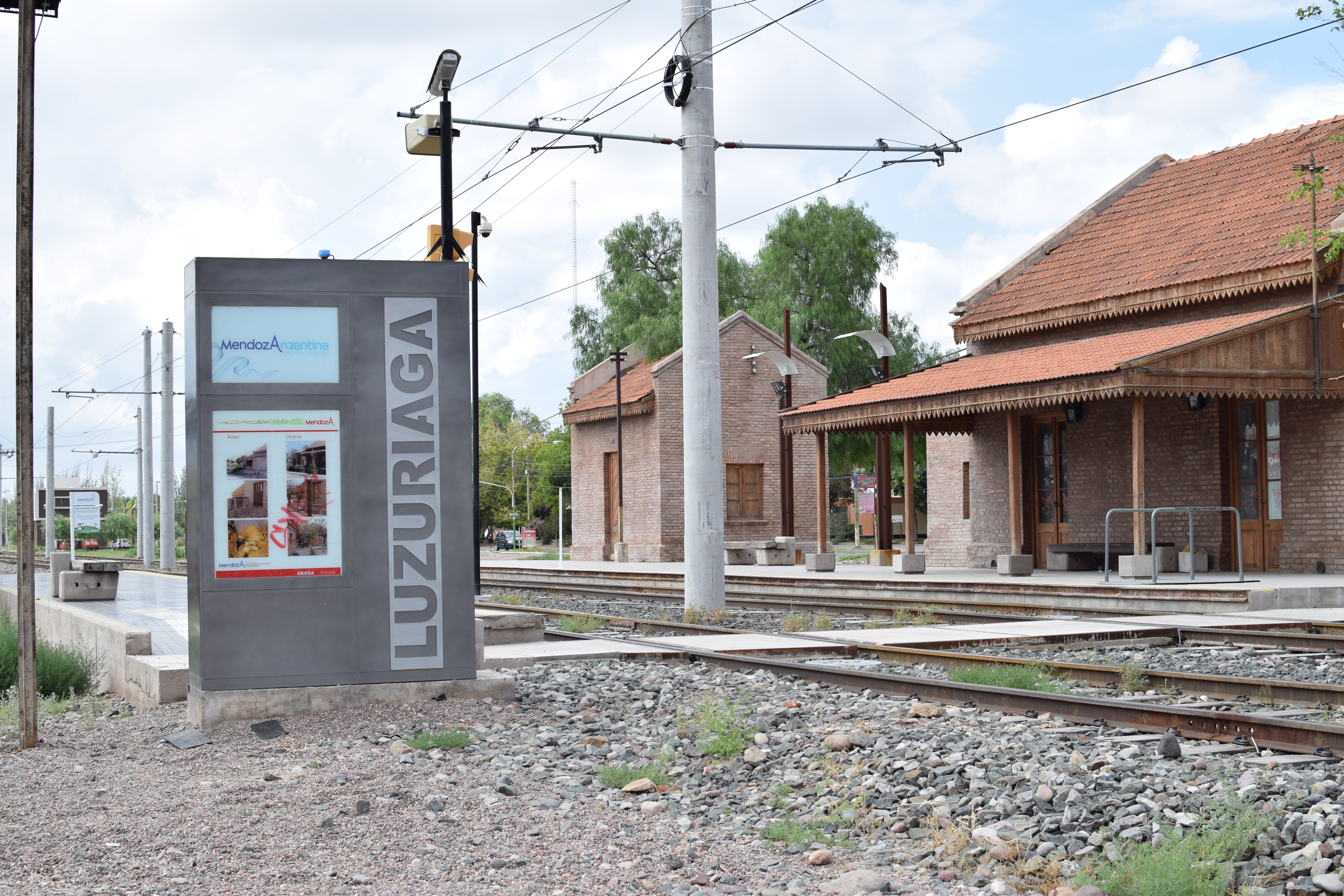

General information
- Location: Luzuriaga, Mendoza; Argentina
- Coordinates: 32.947371°S 68.808168°W
- Transit authority: Sociedad de Transporte Mendoza
- Lines: Metrotranvía Mendoza (passenger); General San Martín Railway (freight)
- Platforms: 2 side platforms
- Tracks: 3

History
- Opened: 28 February 2012

Services
Preceding station	STM	Following station
Piedra Buena towards General Gutiérrez	Metrotranvía Mendoza	9 de Julio towards Avellaneda
Location

Luzuriaga is a light rail station in the city of Luzuriaga, Mendoza, in Maipú Department, Mendoza Province, Argentina. The station opened on 28 February 2012, as part of Metrotranvía Mendoza.

== Images ==
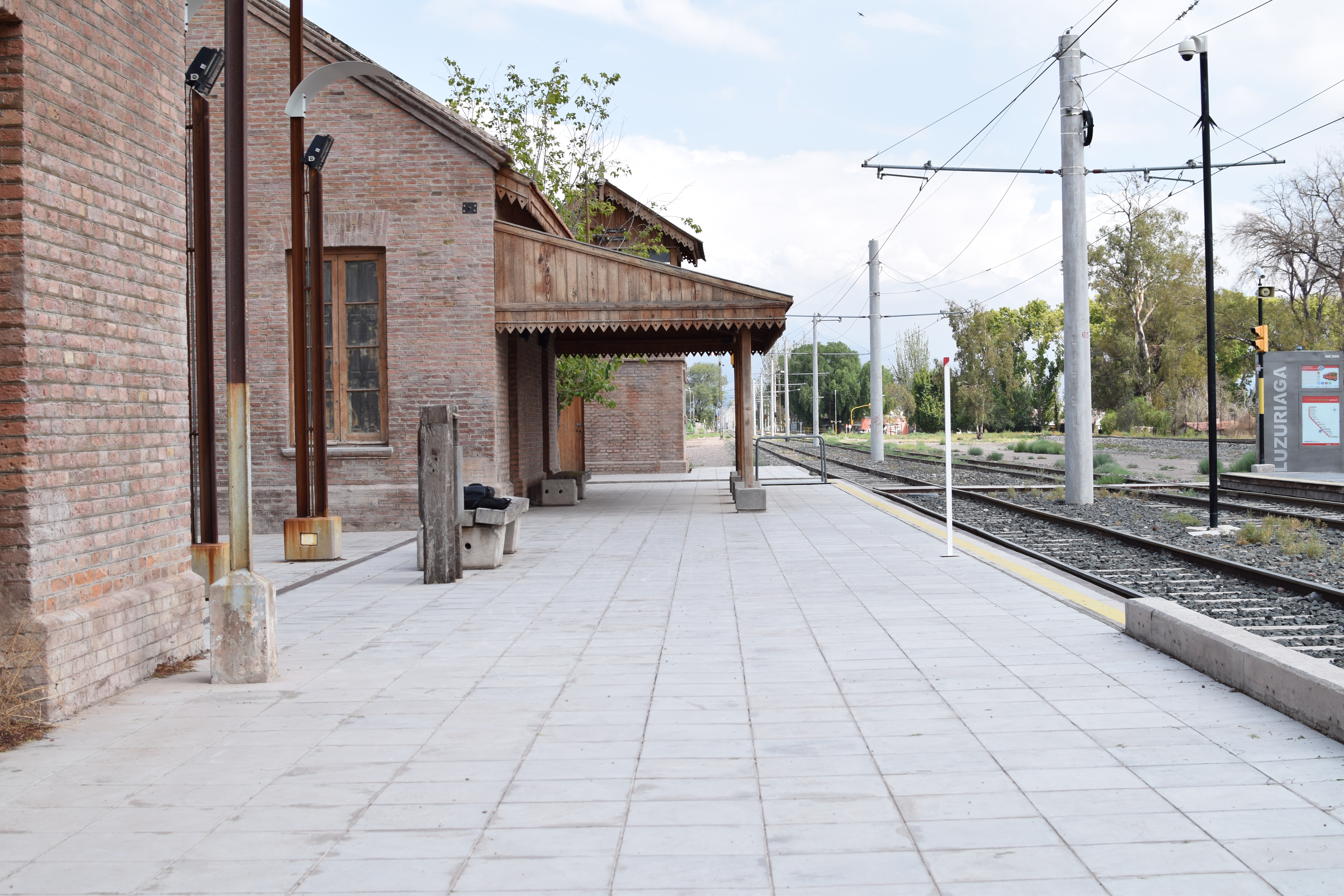

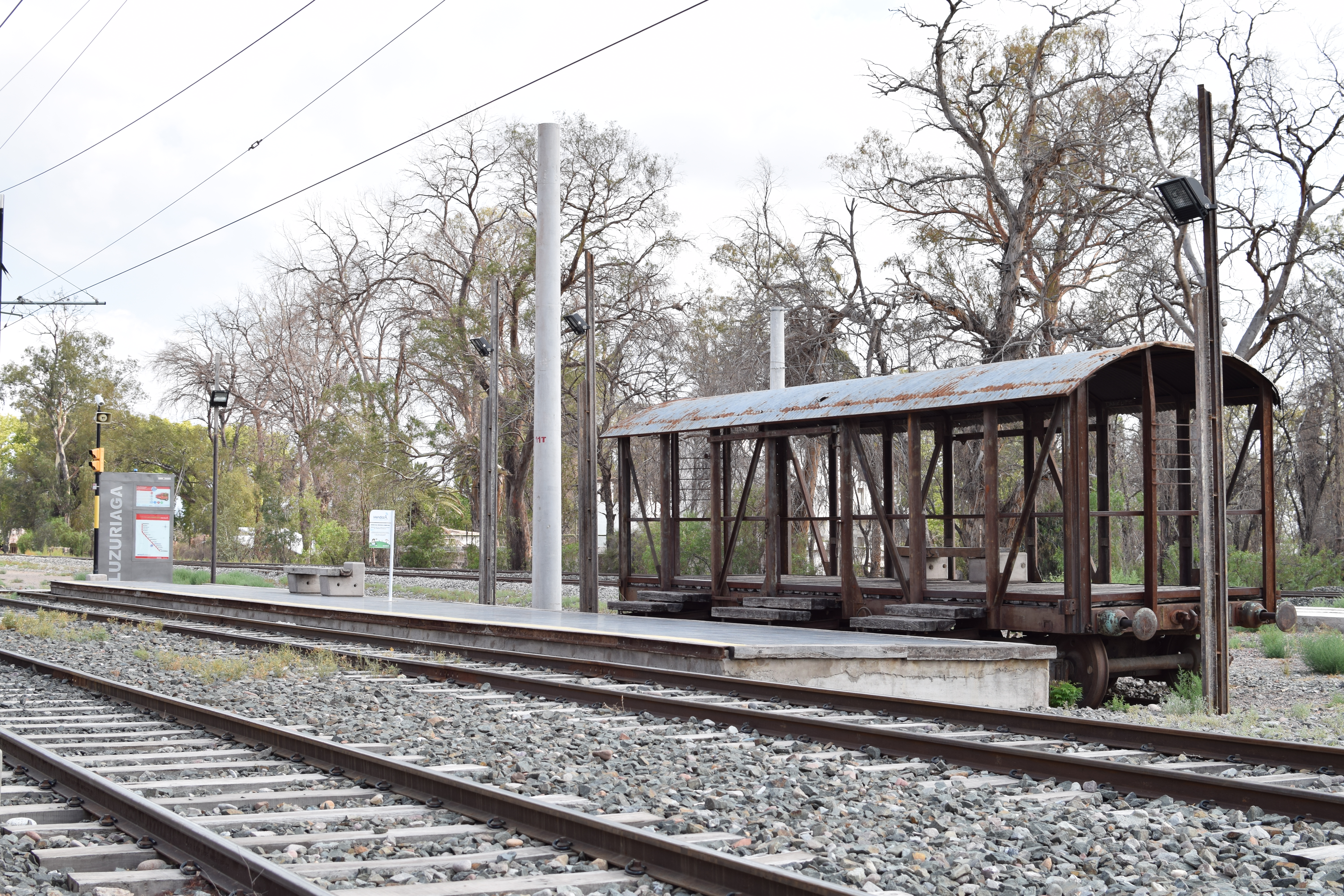

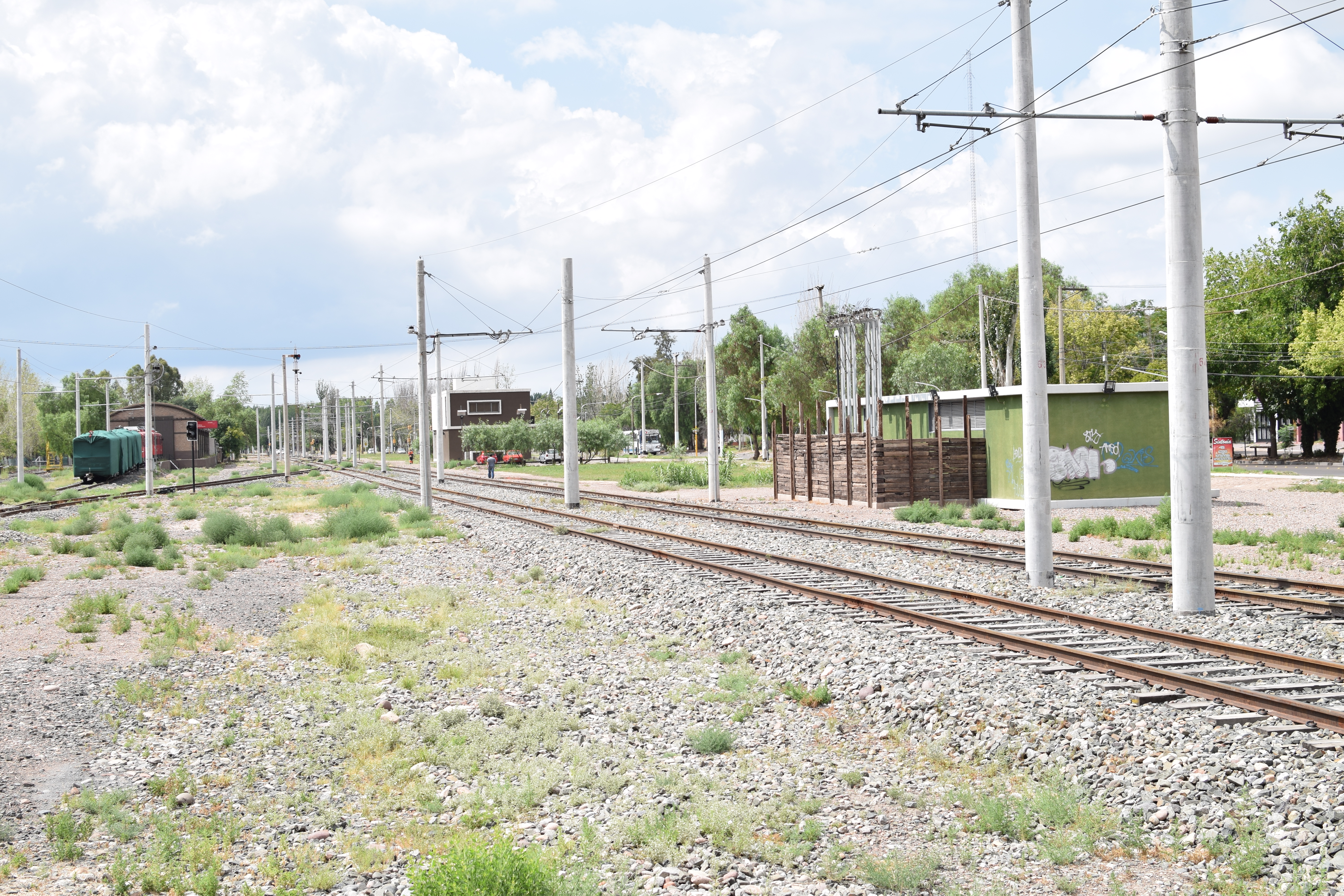

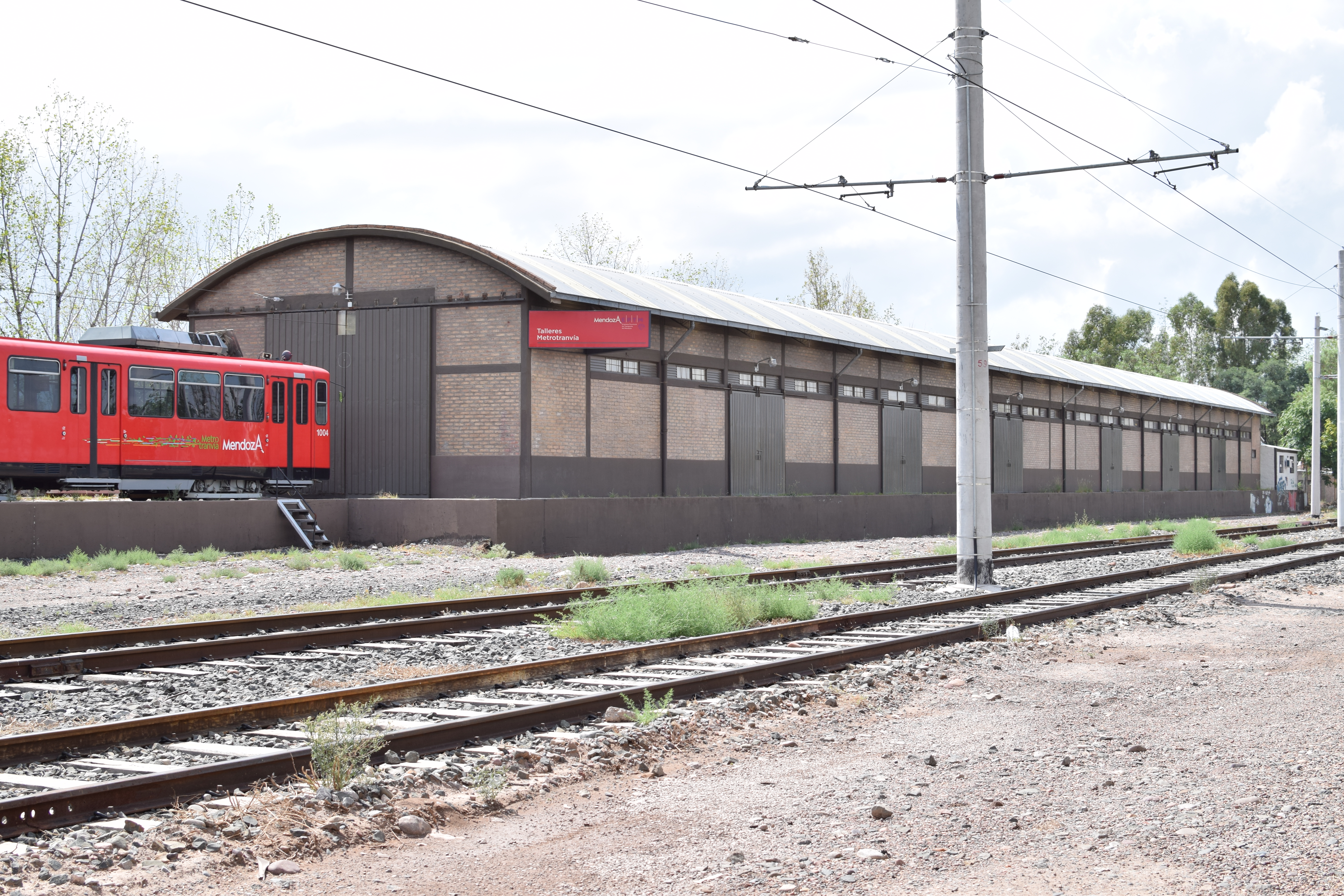

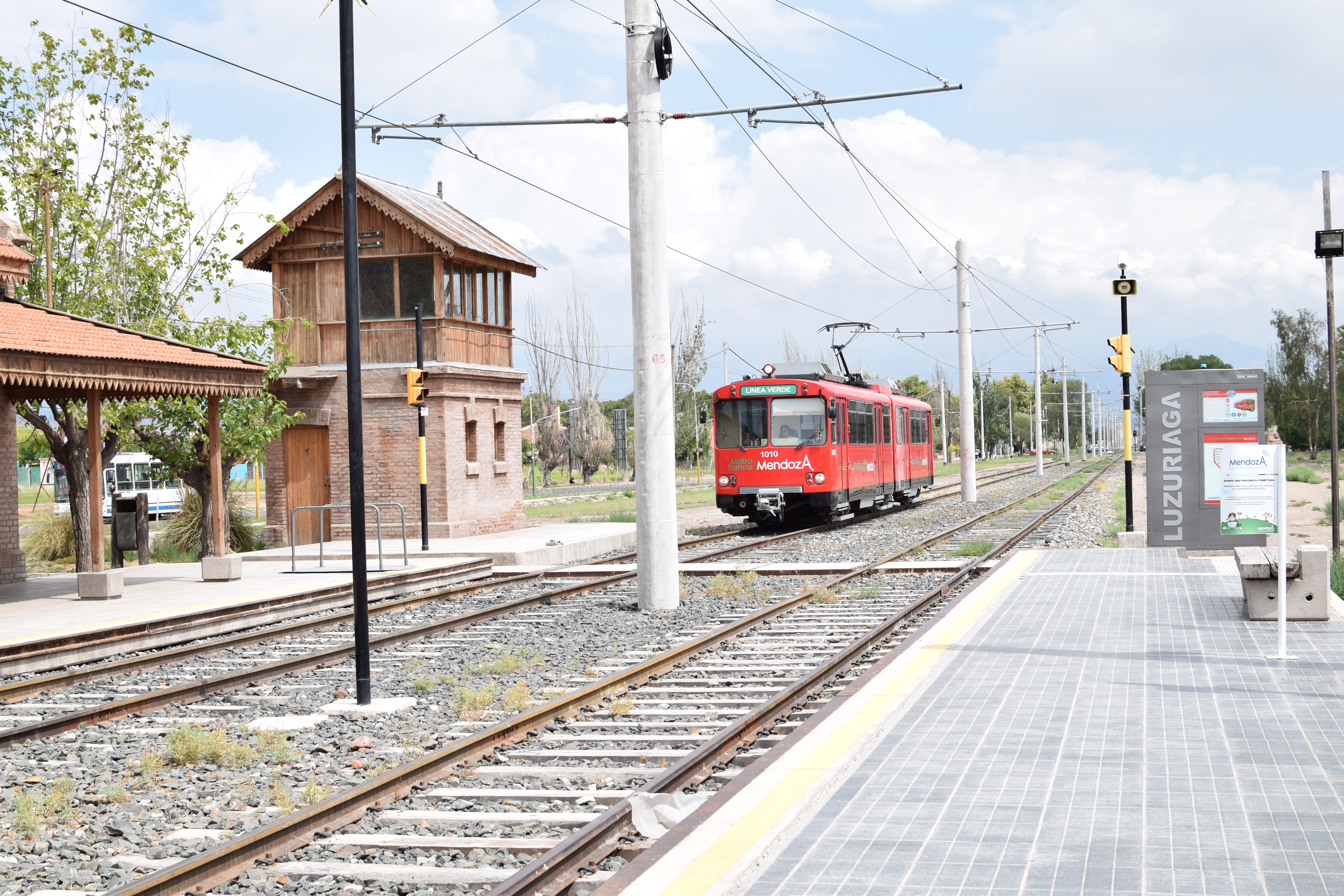

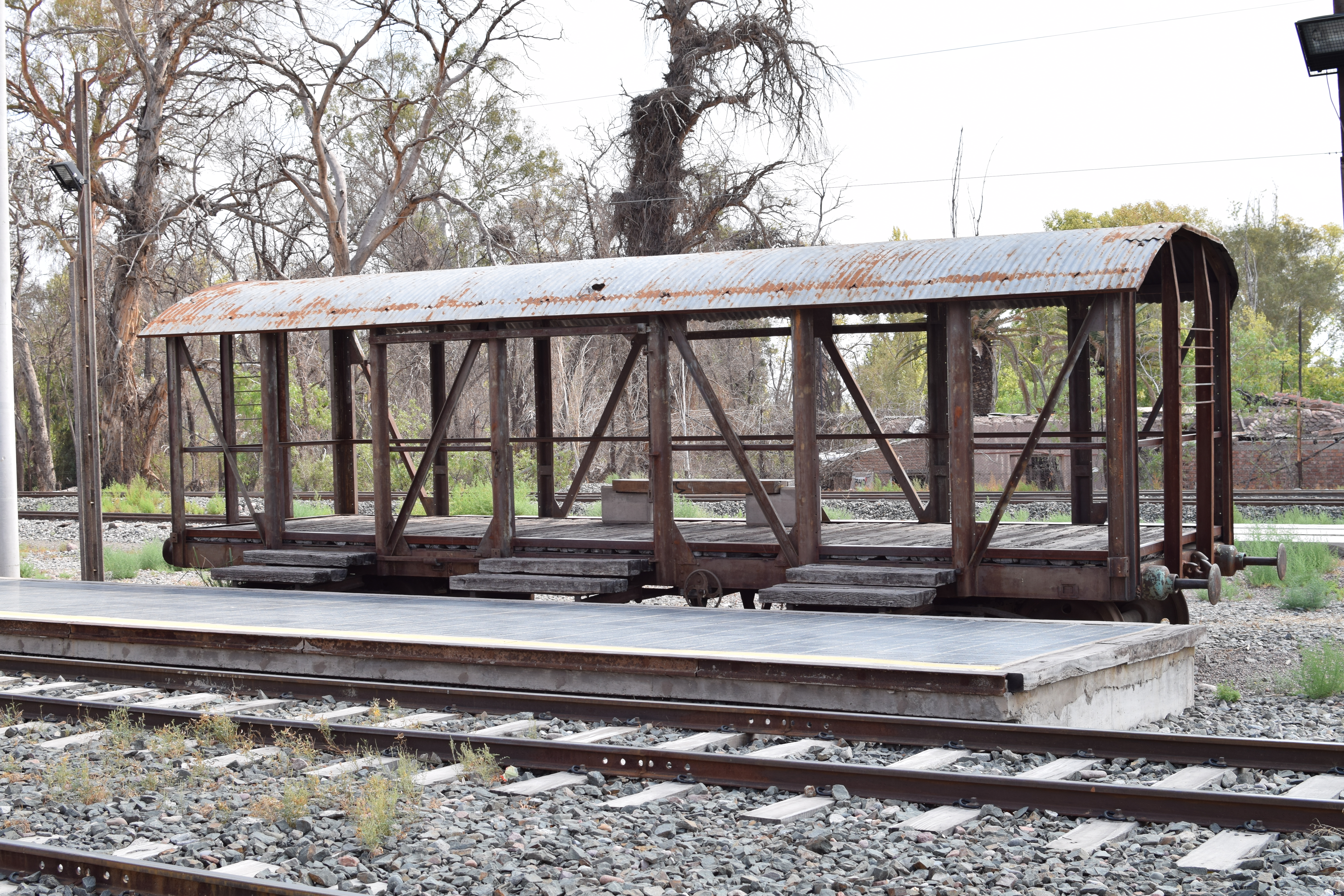

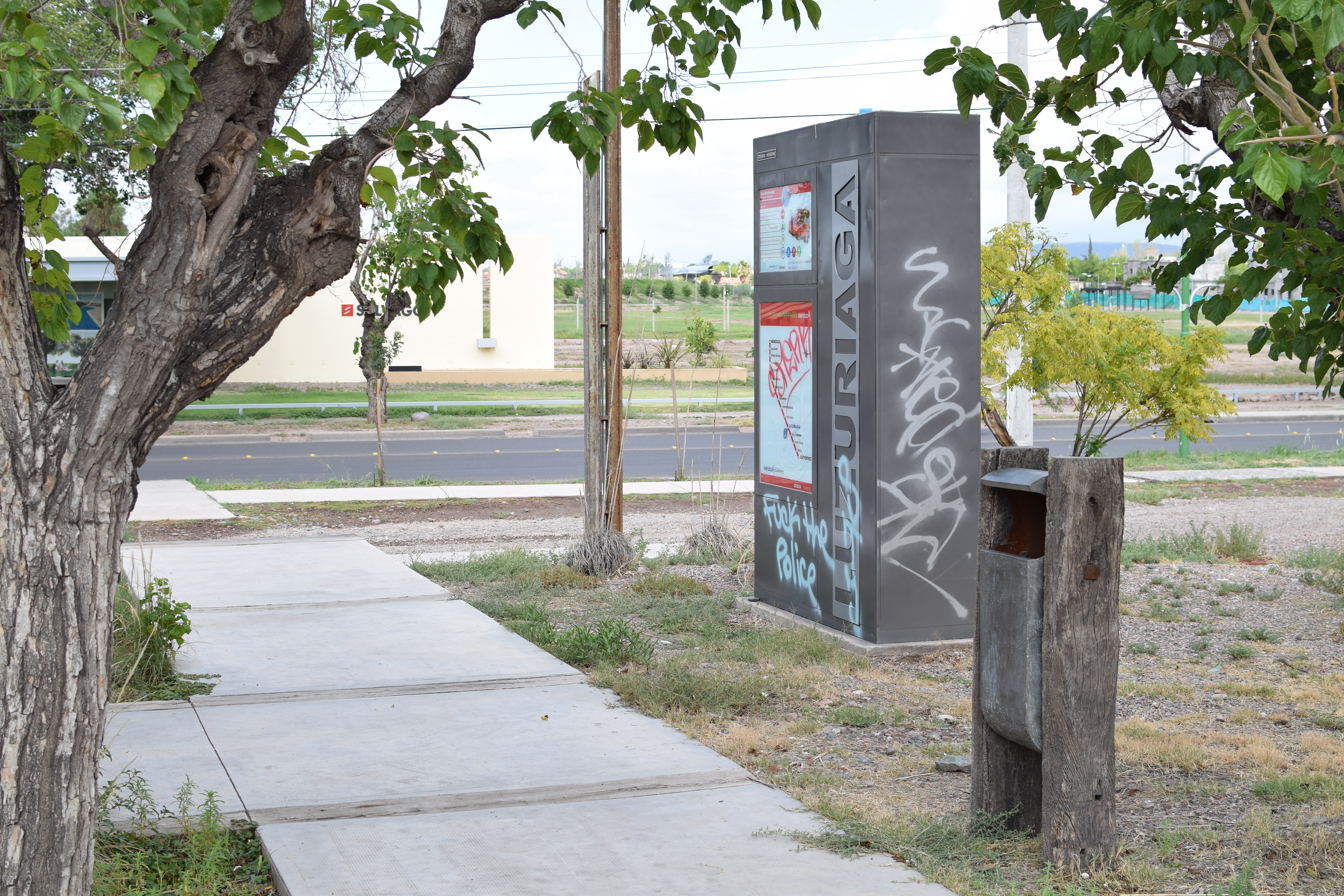
