= Maza station =

Metrotranvía Mendoza station

Maza station Parador Maza
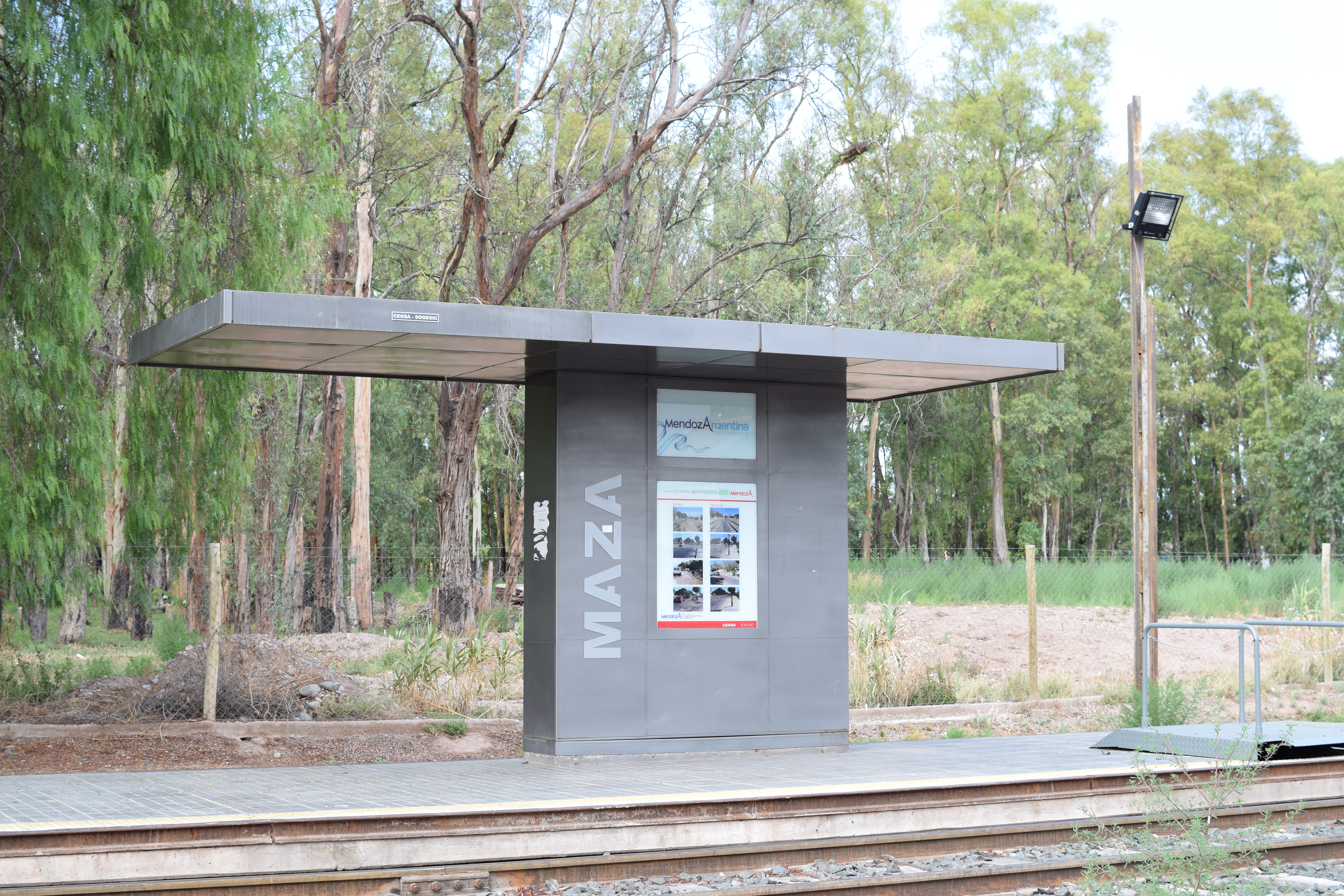

General information
- Location: General Gutiérrez, Mendoza; Argentina
- Coordinates: 32.957128°S 68.789414°W
- Transit authority: Sociedad de Transporte Mendoza
- Platforms: 2 side platforms
- Tracks: 2

History
- Opened: 28 February 2012

Services
Preceding station	STM	Following station
General Gutiérrez Terminus	Metrotranvía Mendoza	Alta Italia towards Avellaneda
Location

Maza is a light rail station located on the intersection of Maza and Soberanía Nacional Streets in the town of General Gutiérrez, Maipú Department, Mendoza Province, Argentina. The station opened on 28 February 2012, as part of Metrotranvía Mendoza.

== Images ==
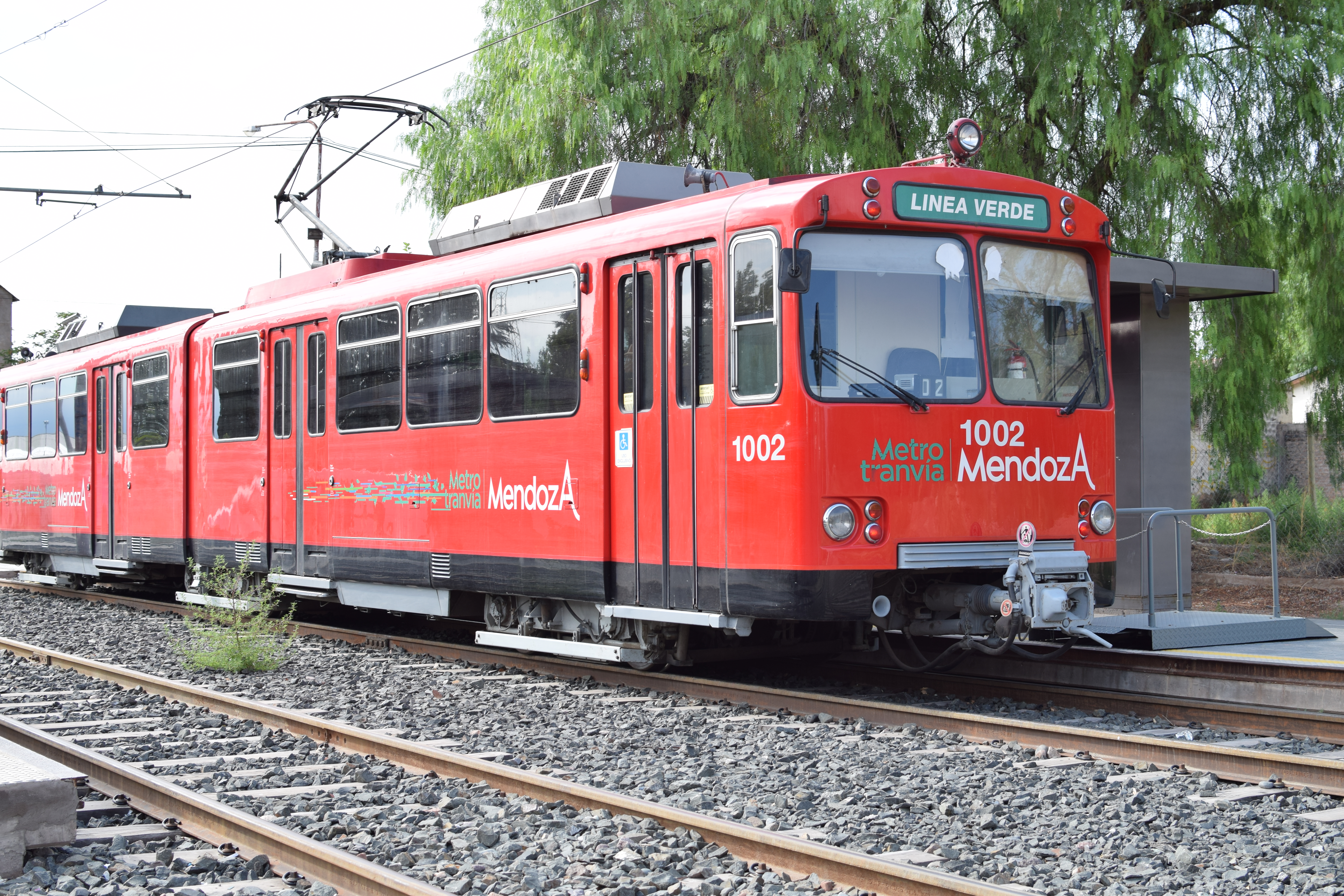

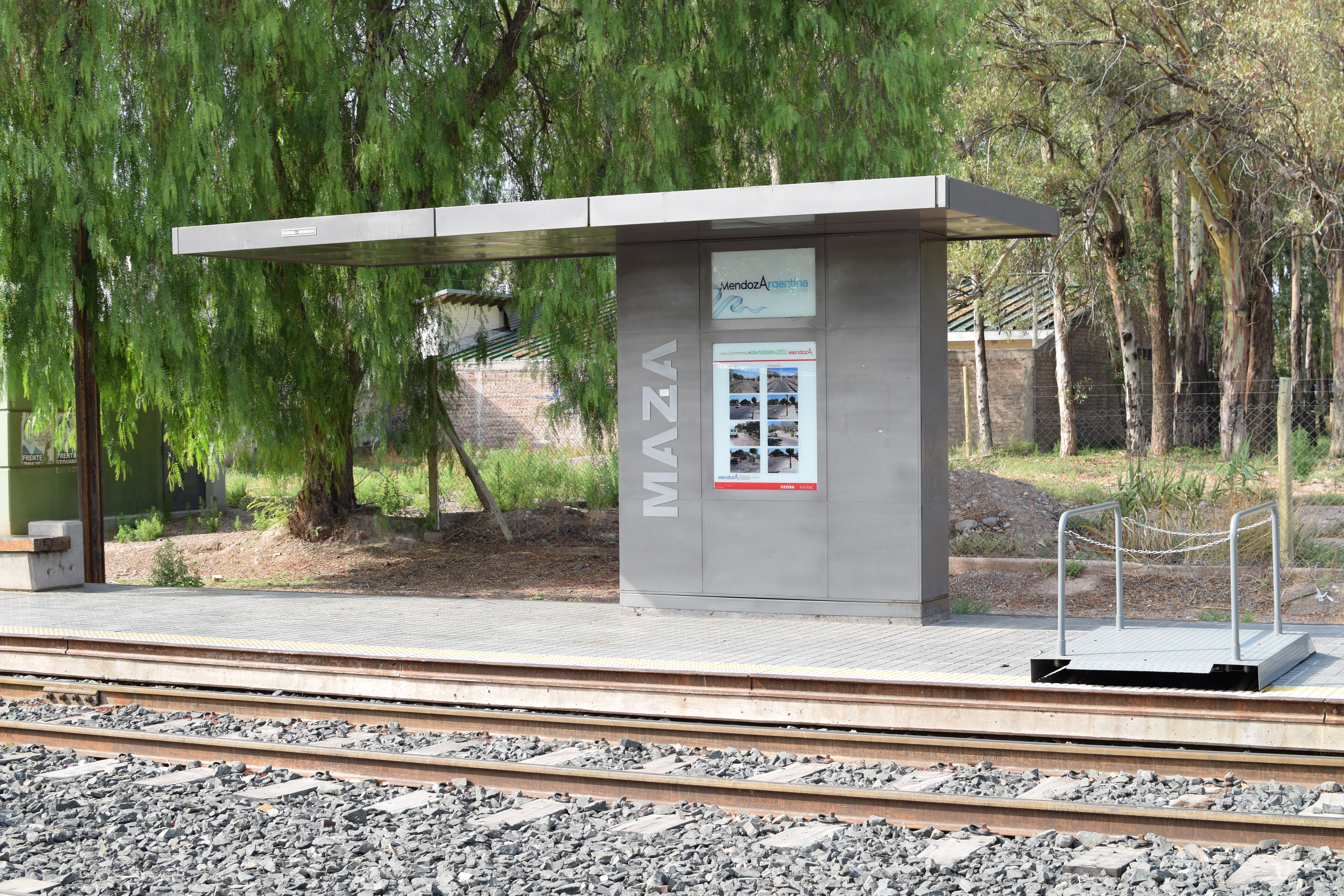

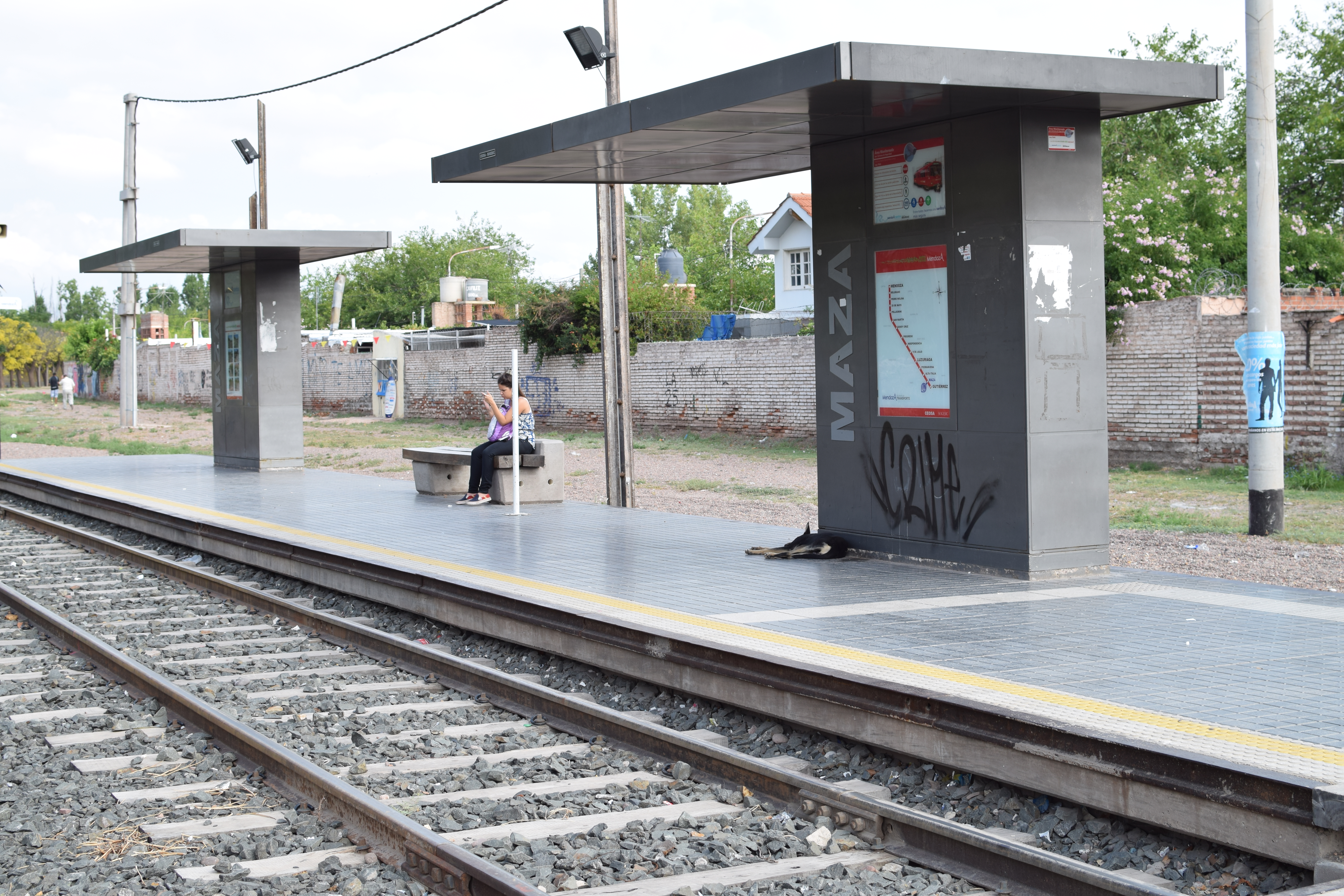
