= Greater Mendoza =

Urban agglomeration in Argentina

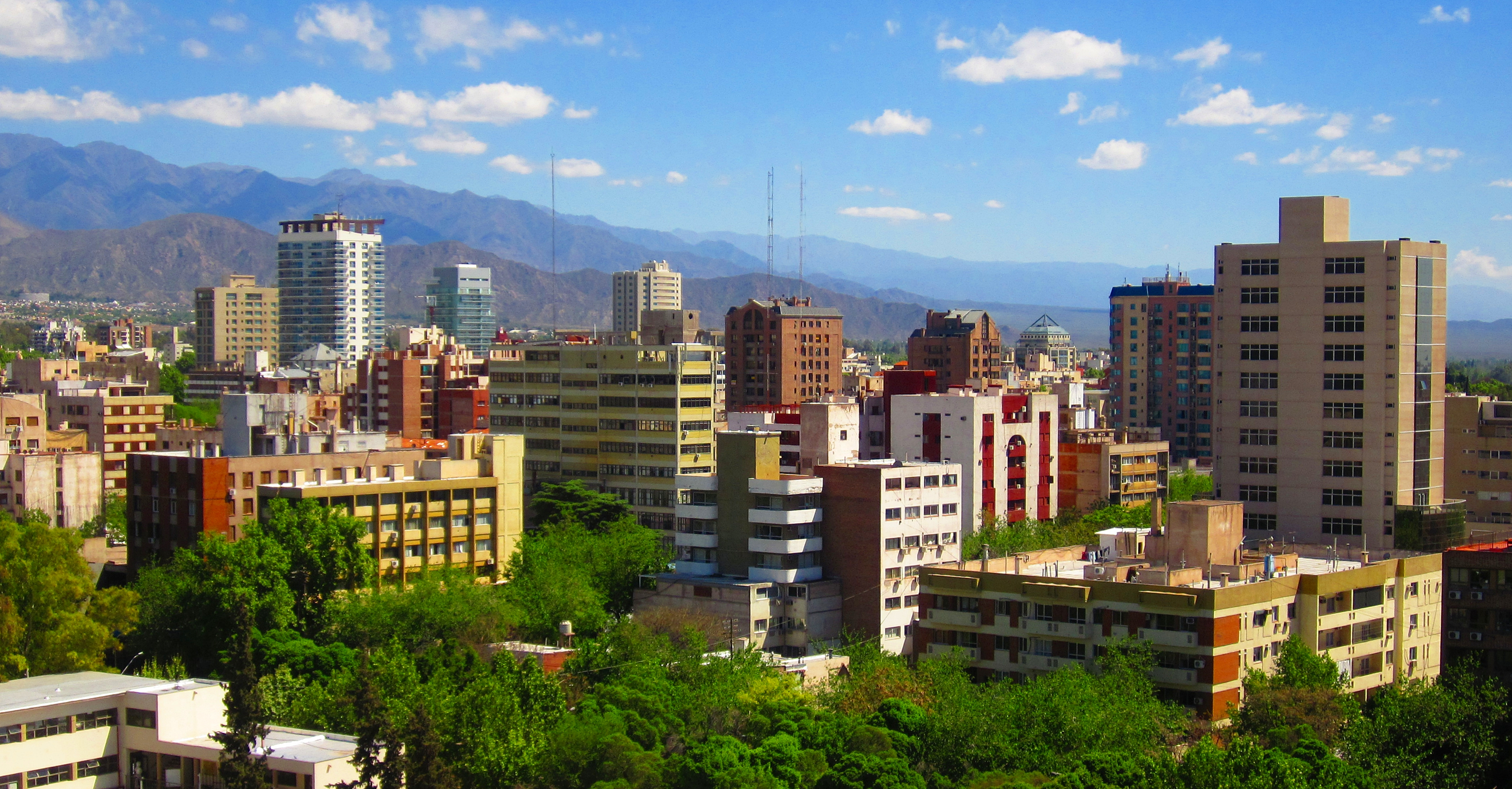
Aerial view of Greater Mendoza.

Gran Mendoza (Greater Mendoza) is the name given to the large urban conurbation around the city of Mendoza in Argentina. The 2001 Census estimated the population of Gran Mendoza as 848,660 making it the 4th largest urban conurbation in Argentina.

The population of Gran Mendoza represents nearly 54% of the population of Mendoza Province.

== Component towns ==
Town	Department	Population
Guaymallén	Guaymallén Department	280.880
Las Heras	Las Heras Department	203.507
Godoy Cruz	Godoy Cruz Department	189.578
Maipú	Maipú Department	172.861
Luján de Cuyo	Luján de Cuyo Department	124.418
Mendoza	Capital Department	114.822
Total		1.086.066

== Transportation ==
The urban area has an urban transport system consisting of numerous bus lines. Likewise, the area also has a system of several trolleybus lines, known as Mendotran. These services are managed by the STM, a government company.

The Terminal del Sol is the bus terminal, which serves the entire area, for this purpose it is located in the center of the agglomerate.

== Health ==
Greater Mendoza works together in health among its departments, so hospitals, clinics and health centers are distributed throughout all the municipalities that make up the urban agglomerate. The main hospitals are:

Mendoza Central Hospital (Mendoza)

Dr Humberto J. Notti Pediatric Hospital (Guaymallén)

Luis Carlos Lagomaggiore Hospital (Mendoza)

Cuyo Polyclinic (Mendoza)

Spanish Hospital (Godoy Cruz)

Italian Hospital of Mendoza (Guaymallén)

José Nestor Lencinas Hospital (Godoy Cruz)

Del Carmen Hospital (Godoy Cruz)

Diego Paroissien Regional Hospital (Maipú)

University Hospital (Mendoza)

Mendoza Military Hospital (Mendoza)

Minister Ramón Carrillo Hospital (Las Heras)
