= Lunlunta =

- District
- Location of Lunlunta in Argentina
- Coordinates: 33°02′S 68°49′W
- Country: Argentina
- Province: Mendoza
- Department: Maipú Department
- Elevation: 759 m (2,490 ft)
- Time zone: UTC−3 (ART)
- CPA base: M5517
- Dialing code: +54 261
- Climate: BWk

Route in Lunlunta, Mendoza Province, Argentina

Lunlunta is a district of the Maipú Department in the Mendoza Province, on the western side of Argentina. It is located about 20 minutes from Mendoza City.

The town is home to many wineries and vineyards.

== See also ==
- Mendoza wine
