= Maipú, Mendoza =

Maipú
- City
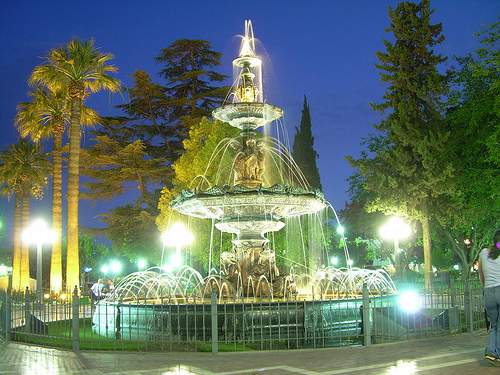
- Fountain of principal square

- Location of Maipú in Argentina
- Coordinates: 32°58′S 68°45′W
- Country: Argentina
- Province: Mendoza
- Department: Maipú Department
- Elevation: 759 m (2,490 ft)

Population (2010 census)
  - Total: 106,662
- Time zone: UTC−3 (ART)
- CPA base: M5515
- Dialing code: +54 261
- Climate: BWk

Maipú is a city in Mendoza Province, Argentina. It is the capital of the Maipú Department. It is located a short distance from the provincial capital, Mendoza.

Maipú is at the centre of an important wine-growing region, and has a wine museum. It has a population of 89,433 (2001 census [INDEC]).

== Gallery ==
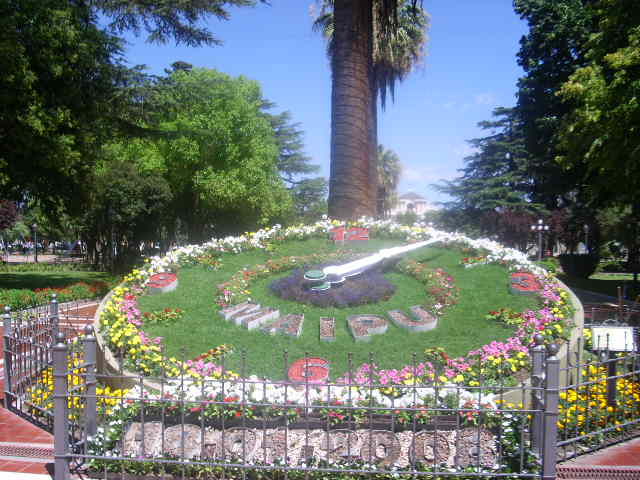
Flower clock of principal square.

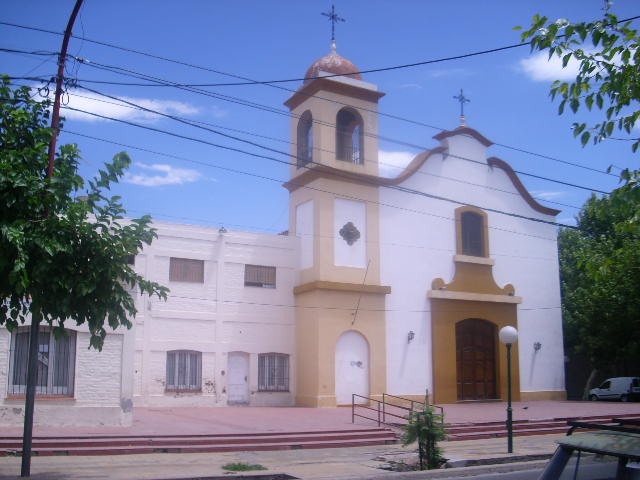
Church of Ntra Señora de la Candelaria.

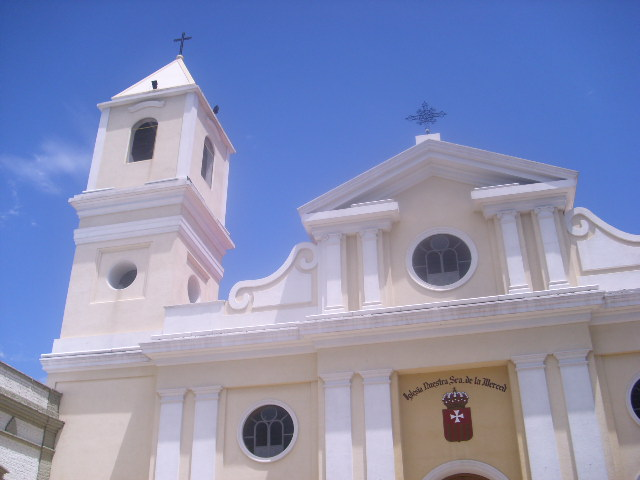
Church of Ntra Señora de la Merced.

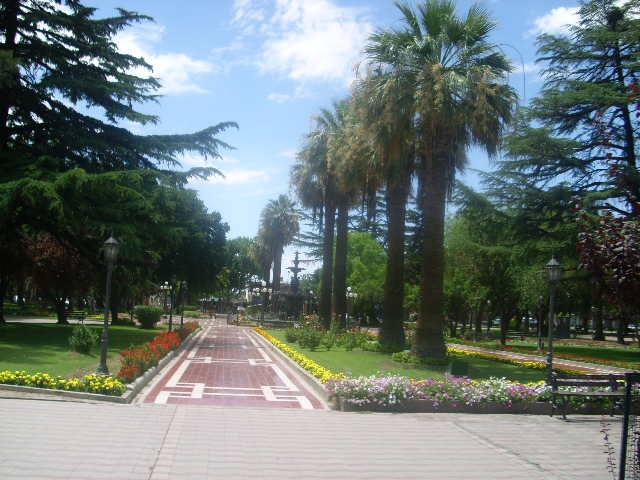
Square 12 de febrero (principal)

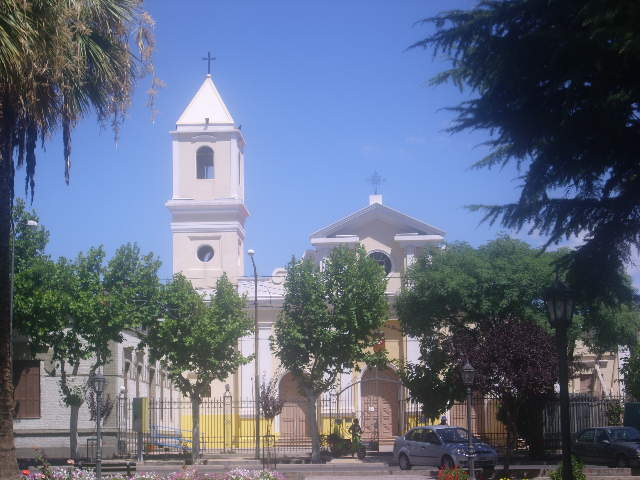
Church La Merced from the square.

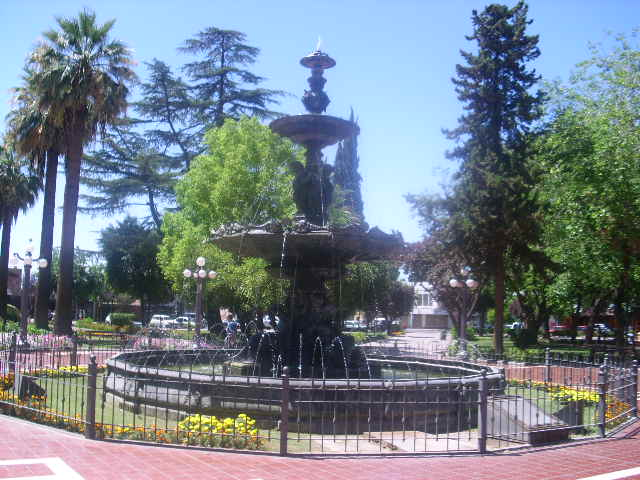
Square's Fountain.

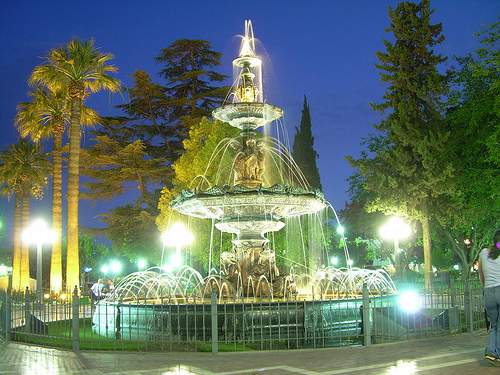
Fountain at night.

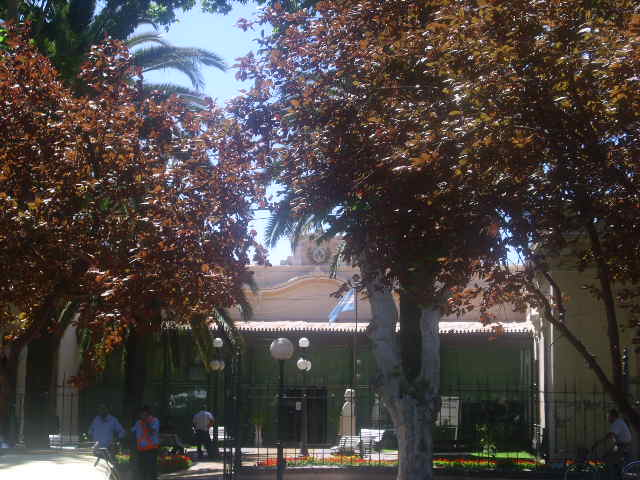
Municipal building

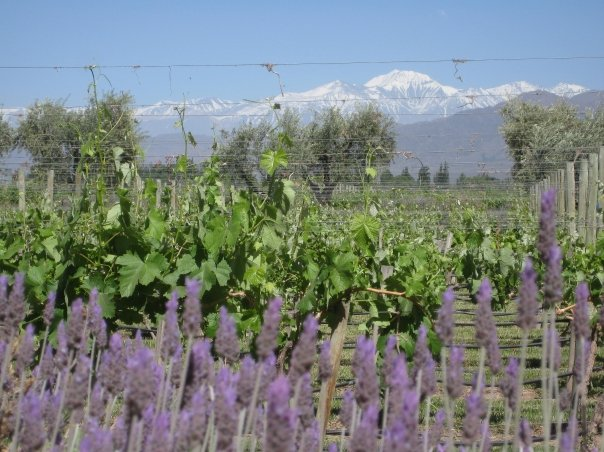
A vineyard with the Andes in the background.

A bicycle beside a vineyard at sunset.

== See also ==
- Mendoza wine
