= Sociedad de Transporte Mendoza =

Public transport company in Argentina

Sociedad de Transporte Mendoza Mendoza Transport Society
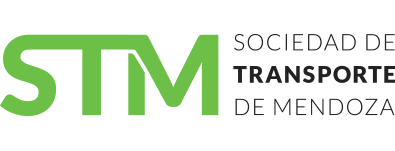

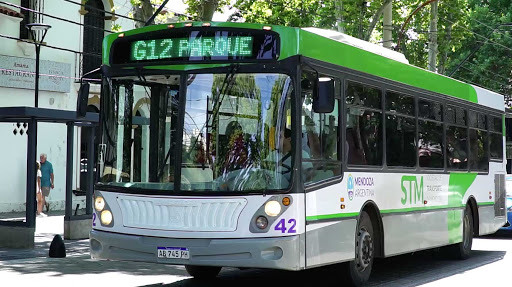
- An STM bus

Overview
- Owner: Government of Mendoza Province
- Area served: Mendoza, Argentina and surrounding areas
- Locale: Greater Mendoza
- Transit type: Buses, light rail, bicycle-sharing system
- Number of lines: 1 light rail line, 6 bus lines
- Number of stations: 25 (light rail)
- Chief executive: Daniel Vilches
- Headquarters: City of Mendoza
- Website: stmendoza.com

Operation
- Began operation: 14 February 1958; 68 years ago (as EPTM); 1 January 2017; 9 years ago (as STM)

Technical
- System length: 45 kilometres (28 mi)

The Sociedad de Transporte Mendoza (STM; Mendoza Transport Society) is a public transportations system owned by Mendoza Province, Argentina. It operates six bus routes, the Metrotranvía Mendoza, and BiciTRAN, a bicycle-sharing system in Greater Mendoza. Additionally, it also formerly operated trolleybuses until they were discontinued in 2021.

The company was founded on 14 February 1958, as the Provincial Transport Company of Mendoza (Spanish: Empresa Provincial de Transportes de Mendoza, EPTM), with the opening of the first trolleybus route. The STM, as it has been known since 2017, is currently under the control of the Undersecretary of Transportation of the province of Mendoza.

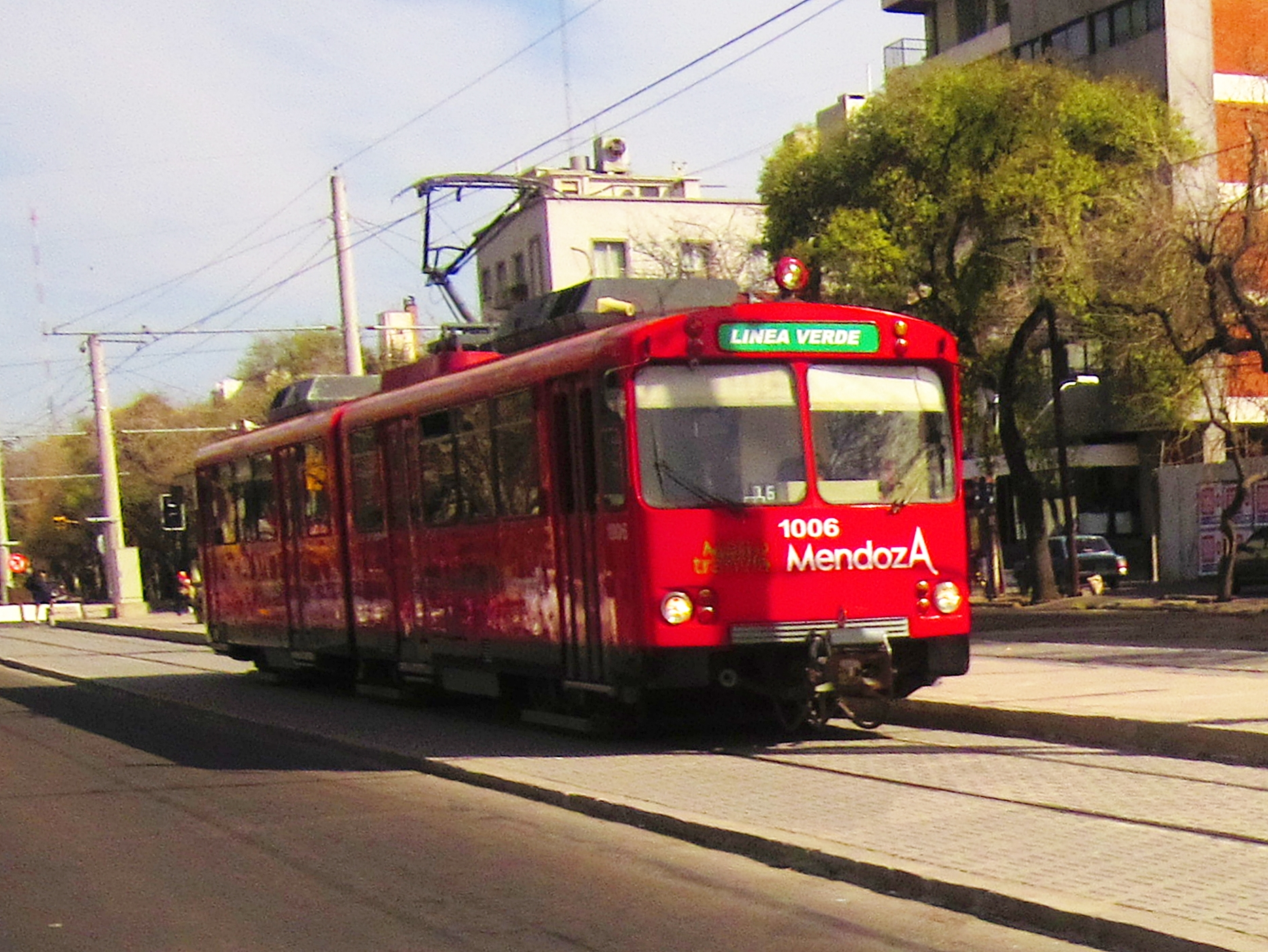
Metrotranvía Mendoza.

Its headquarters and main workshop are located on the intersection of Perú and Carlos Pellegrini Avenues in the City of Mendoza. Today, it has a fleet of 80 vehicles, used on eight lines that have a total length of 45 kilometres (28 mi). On the other hand, the company is also in charge of the operation of the Metrotranvía Mendoza, which opened in 2012.

== Routes ==
Type	Route	Terminals		Links	Notes
Metrotranvía Mendoza	100	General Gutiérrez	Avellaneda		Numbered 100 northbound, and 101 southbound
Metrotranvía Mendoza	101	Avellaneda	General Gutiérrez		Numbered 100 northbound, and 101 southbound
Buses	110	Las Heras	Godoy Cruz		
Buses	120	Guaymallén	Parque San Martín		Via UNCuyo
Buses	121	Guaymallén	Parque San Martín		
Buses	125	Barrio Soberanía	Terminal de Ómnibus		Via UNCuyo
Buses	126	Barrio Soberanía	Terminal de Ómnibus		
Buses	130	Parque Central	Sexta Sección		

== Present day ==
Today, the STM provides services in the departments of Capital, Godoy Cruz, Las Heras, Guaymallen and Maipú, using a wide variety of models. With the commissioning of the new Mendotran transport system in 2019, the STM received certain routes considered trunk and strategic for urban mobility in Greater Mendoza.

Several Chinese battery electric buses built by BYD and Zhongtong were also incorporated into its fleet. These buses mainly provide service on routes 110 and 130, where they replaced the now-retired trolleybuses.

Works are also being carried out for the Metrotranvía to reach Luján de Cuyo and the Francisco Gabrielli Airport.

== Mendotran ==
On January 2, 2019, the Government of the province of Mendoza put into operation the new public transport system called Mendotran. With it, the STM went from a radial system to one where the buses connect the different areas of Greater Mendoza without passing through the city center.

== History ==
=== Trolleybuses ===
On the morning of 14 February 1958, the first of the trolleybuses in Mendoza began operating between Gutiérrez and 9 de Julio. As a result, the EPTM began operations, initiated by the then Federal Comptroller in the province of Mendoza, Isidoro Busquets, who inaugurated the trolleybus service in Mendoza. These first buses, built by Mercedes-Benz, were bought secondhand from Buenos Aires. 25 of them would be acquired by 1960.

The second trolleybus line, the Villa Nueva (or Villanueva) line, opened in February 1959, and a third, the Dorrego line, opened in 1961. In 1962, 36 new trolleybuses built by Toshiba began to arrive. The Mercedes-Benz buses were already retired by 1963.

Those three services were used by an increasing number of passengers. Hence, in 1984, the EPTM bought 17 new ZIU-9 trolleybuses. These buses were built by ZIU in Engels, Saratov Oblast (then part of the Soviet Union; now part of Russia), so the Mendozans nicknamed them rusos (English: Russians). In 1988, the EPTM began replacing the Toshiba buses with secondhand trolleybuses purchased from the trolleybus network in Solingen, West Germany.

Returning to the lines, in April 2004 that the Godoy Cruz-Las Heras trolleybus line was opened. followed by the university line on 14 October 2005.

A few years later, in December 2008, 80 New Flyer trolleybuses bought secondhand from the trolleybus network in Vancouver, began arriving in Mendoza for service on the EPTM. By 2010, the ex-Vancouver buses replaced all of the previous EPTM trolleybuses. However, these buses were soon running unreliably. In 2012, EPTM began receiving 13 Materfer trolleybuses (although only 12 entered service). By September 2016, only 11 New Flyer trolleybuses and 12 Materfer trolleybuses were still in service. In late 2016, the Villa Nueva and Godoy Cruz–Las Heras routes were being operated by motorbuses due to a shortage of serviceable trolleybuses. The last Mendoza trolleybus line was closed by February 2021, due to mechanical issues. By that time, only 2 Materfer buses were left in operation.

=== Transformation of EPTM to STM ===
At the end of 2016, the provincial government dissolved EPTM after concluding that its financial losses were too great. It was immediately replaced, on 1 January 2017, by a Sociedad de Transporte de Mendoza (STM), a newly formed single-shareholder public corporation (a Sociedad Anónima Unipersonal, or SAU), a private company that is, however, still owned by the provincial government. The STM now operates the motorbuses that replaced the trolleybuses in Mendoza, as well as the Metrotranvía Mendoza.
