= Metrotranvía Mendoza =

Public transport system in Mendoza, Argentina

Coordinates: 32°53′26″S 68°51′01″W

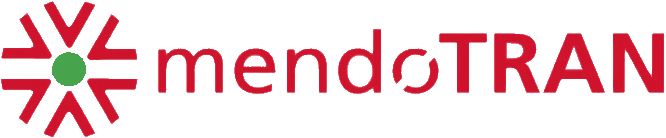

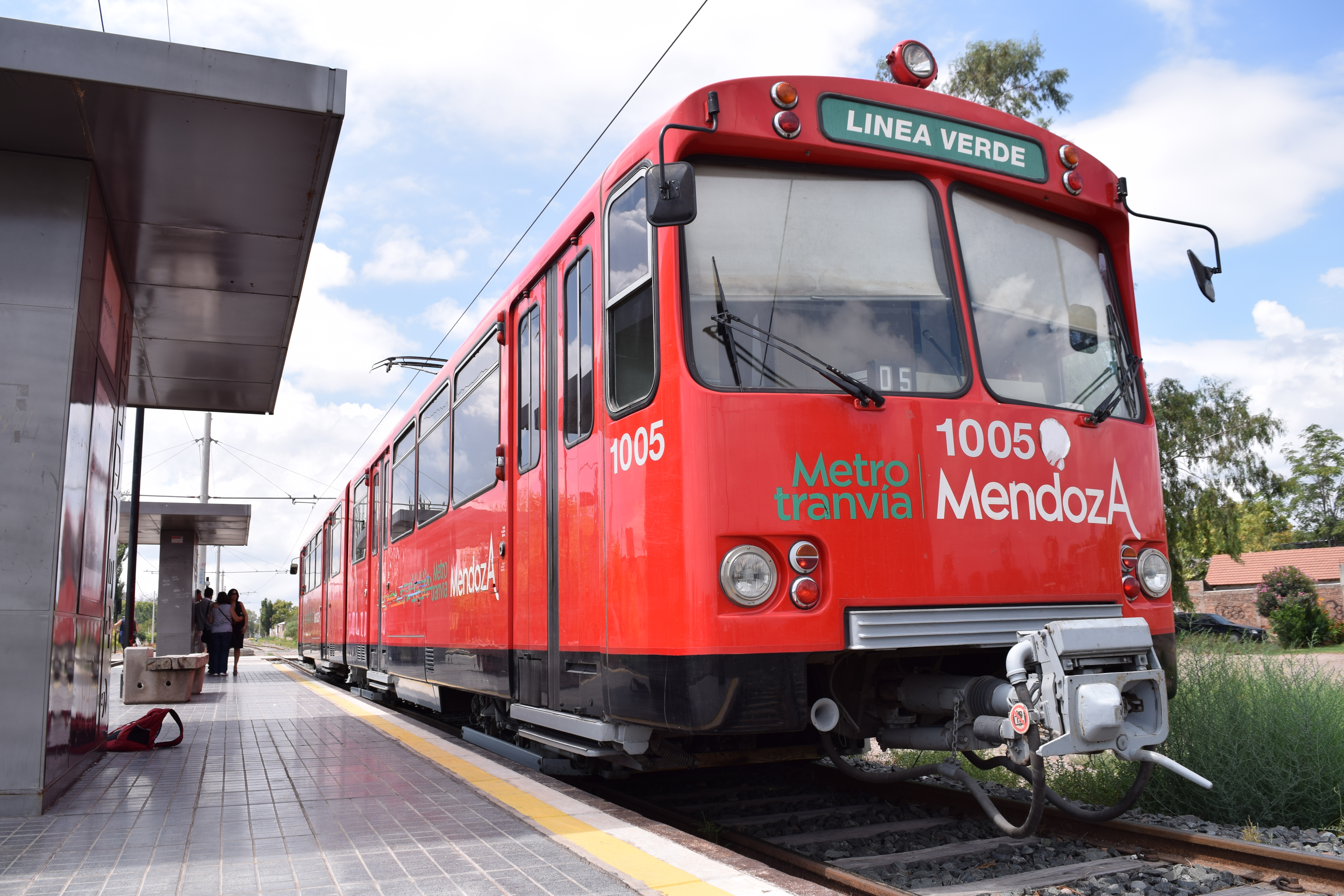
- Train at 9 de Julio station, February 2015

Overview
- Owner: Government of Mendoza
- Area served: Greater Mendoza
- Locale: Mendoza, Argentina
- Transit type: Light rail
- Number of lines: 1
- Number of stations: 26
- Daily ridership: 30,000 (2025)
- Annual ridership: 4.8 million (2024)
- Website: mendoza.gov.ar/mtm

Operation
- Began operation: 8 October 2012
- Operator: Sociedad de Transporte Mendoza (STM)
- Number of vehicles: 50

Technical
- System length: 17 km (11 mi)
- Track gauge: 1,435 mm (4 ft 8 1/2 in) standard gauge
- Electrification: 600 V DC, overhead lines
System map
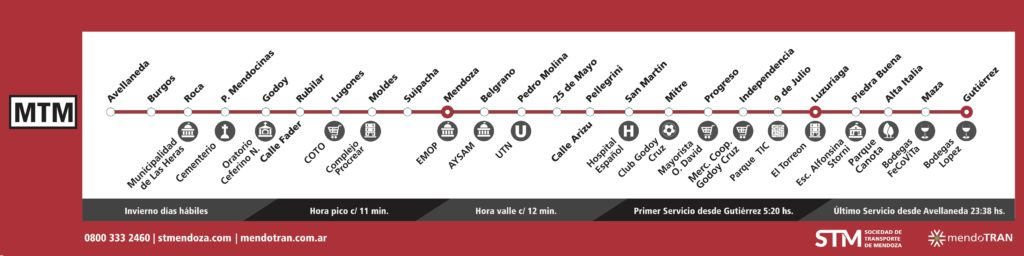

The Metrotranvía Mendoza (Spanish for Mendoza Light Rail or fast tramway) is a public light rail transport system for the city of Mendoza, Argentina, served by articulated light rail cars operating on newly relaid tracks in former-General San Martín Railway mainline right-of-way.

The 17-kilometre (11 mi) line runs between Parador Avellaneda in Las Heras and General Gutierrez in Maipú, on 1,435 mm (4 ft 8 1/2 in) standard gauge double-track rail. The Metrotranvía of Mendoza serves the metropolitan area of Mendoza, which includes the departments of Las Heras, Central district, Godoy Cruz, Maipú and Luján de Cuyo. Service operates from 6:00 to 22:00. The line has been named the Línea Verde, or Green Line. The line operates on the right-hand side like road traffic, in contrast to the left-handed operation of the majority of the Argentine railway network.

== History ==
In 2009 the Government of Mendoza Province signed an agreement to build a tram line between the cities of Mendoza and Maipú, at an estimated cost of AR$ 62,449,732. Works were carried out by private companies Construcciones Electromecánicas del Oeste S.A. (CEOSA) and SOGESIC S.A.

Project included a total refurbishment of Mendoza station, which had operated between 1885 and 1993 when it was closed by the national government. The administrative building was reopened as a cultural centre named "Estación Cultural",

An inauguration ceremony was held in February 2012, but service did not begin at that time, as much of the construction work remained to be completed. Starting on 29 April 2012 passengers were permitted to ride on occasional demonstration/trial services on a portion of the line. The system finally opened for regular service on 8 October 2012.

=== 2019 extension to Las Heras ===
In 2019, the main building at Mendoza railway station was completely remodeled, as part of an extension to Las Heras, Mendoza. The rails used for this extension was manufactured in Spain, while the concrete sleepers were built in Argentina. This extension included the construction of new level crossings, as well as the refurbishment of old railway stations. This extension, bringing the Metrotranvía to Las Heras, Mendoza, opened to the public on 7 May 2019. The Metrotranvía now ends at Avellaneda station, located on Avellaneda Street in Panquehua, a neighborhood in Las Heras.

== Future plans ==
=== Light rail expansion ===
An under-construction project will extend the line 4.8 km (3 mi) from Panquehua to El Plumerillo International Airport, and add another 15 km (9.3 mi) branch from the intermediate Godoy Cruz stop to Luján de Cuyo. As of 2022, the airport extension was expected to open in 2025. However, as of January 2026, it is instead scheduled to open by the end of 2026.

Meanwhile, the Luján de Cuyo branch, which is already under construction, was initially planned to open in 2028. However, on 17 January 2024, it was announced that the Luján extension may open in 2027 instead.

=== Commuter Rail ===
In June 2025, the Eastern Commuter Rail (Spanish: Tren de Cercanías del Este) project was approved, proposing to extend rail service from the current Metrotranvía terminal at General Gutiérrez station (Maipú) to Libertador General San Martín Station, on the border between the departments of San Martín and Junín. The estimated length is approximately 35 kilometres (22 mi), following the route of the old General San Martín Railway branch line. The project includes the rehabilitation of intermediate stations such as Palmira, with the aim of reconnecting the main historical railway towns of eastern Mendoza with Greater Mendoza. It will be financed 50% by the Provincial Government and 50% by private investment, while the National Government, through the National Secretariat of Transportation, has granted the use of the tracks for this purpose. Light diesel multiple units are planned, with frequencies adapted to an estimated demand of around 300,000 passengers.

As of 30 March 2026, it was expected that the contracts for building the commuter train will be rewarded. However, as of June 2026, the contract has yet to be awarded.

As of May 2026, CRRC Tangshan is planned to supply the diesel multiple units for this line. There is also the possibility that the commuter train may share tracks with the light rail via dual gauge trackage, with the commuter rail being a metre-gauge railway and the Metrotranvía being standard gauge.

Eastern Commuter Rail

== Rolling stock ==
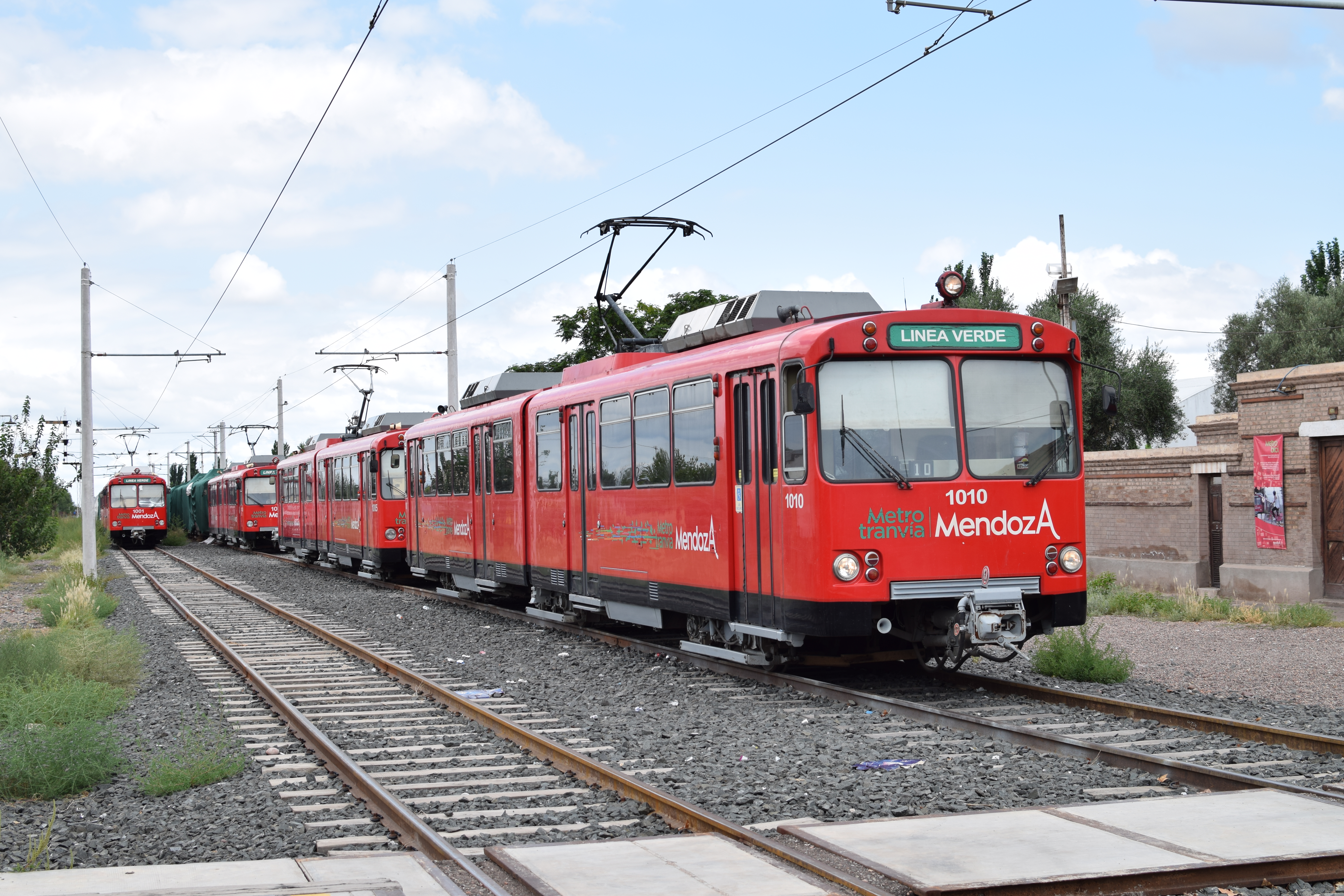
Some of the ex-San Diego Siemens–Duewag U2 light rail vehicles that make up the fleet

The service was initially provided by nine (out of eleven delivered) Siemens–Duewag U2 light-rail vehicles (LRVs) acquired secondhand from the San Diego Trolley system in San Diego, California. The first four (ex-San Diego cars 1028, 1055, 1070, and 1071) arrived in Mendoza in February 2011. More had arrived by November 2011, and the delivery was completed with the final two cars arriving on 27 April 2012. Two cars (ex-San Diego 1055 and 1058) were used for spare parts.

In 2014 another seven cars were delivered, two of which entered service in 2019 (ex-San Diego 1056 and 1057, renumbered to 1009 and 1011), and the remaining serving as spare parts donors.

In February 2022, the San Diego Metropolitan Transit System sent the first three of 39 Siemens SD-100 light rail vehicles to Mendoza. 27 SD100s have been delivered by November 2025.

Current rail fleet
Image	Model	Fleet numbers (Qty.)	Build Date	Retired in San Diego	Entered service in Mendoza
	Siemens–Duewag U2	1001–1011 (11 units, ex-San Diego, where they were numbered in the range 1027–1071)	1985–1989	2010–2015	2012, 2019
	Siemens SD-100	2001–2027 (27 units, 39 expected in total)	1995	2022–2023	2022–present

== See also ==
- Trolleybuses in Mendoza
- Trams in Buenos Aires
- Rosario Tramway
