= General Gutiérrez station =

Metrotranvía Mendoza station

General Gutiérrez station Estación General Gutiérrez
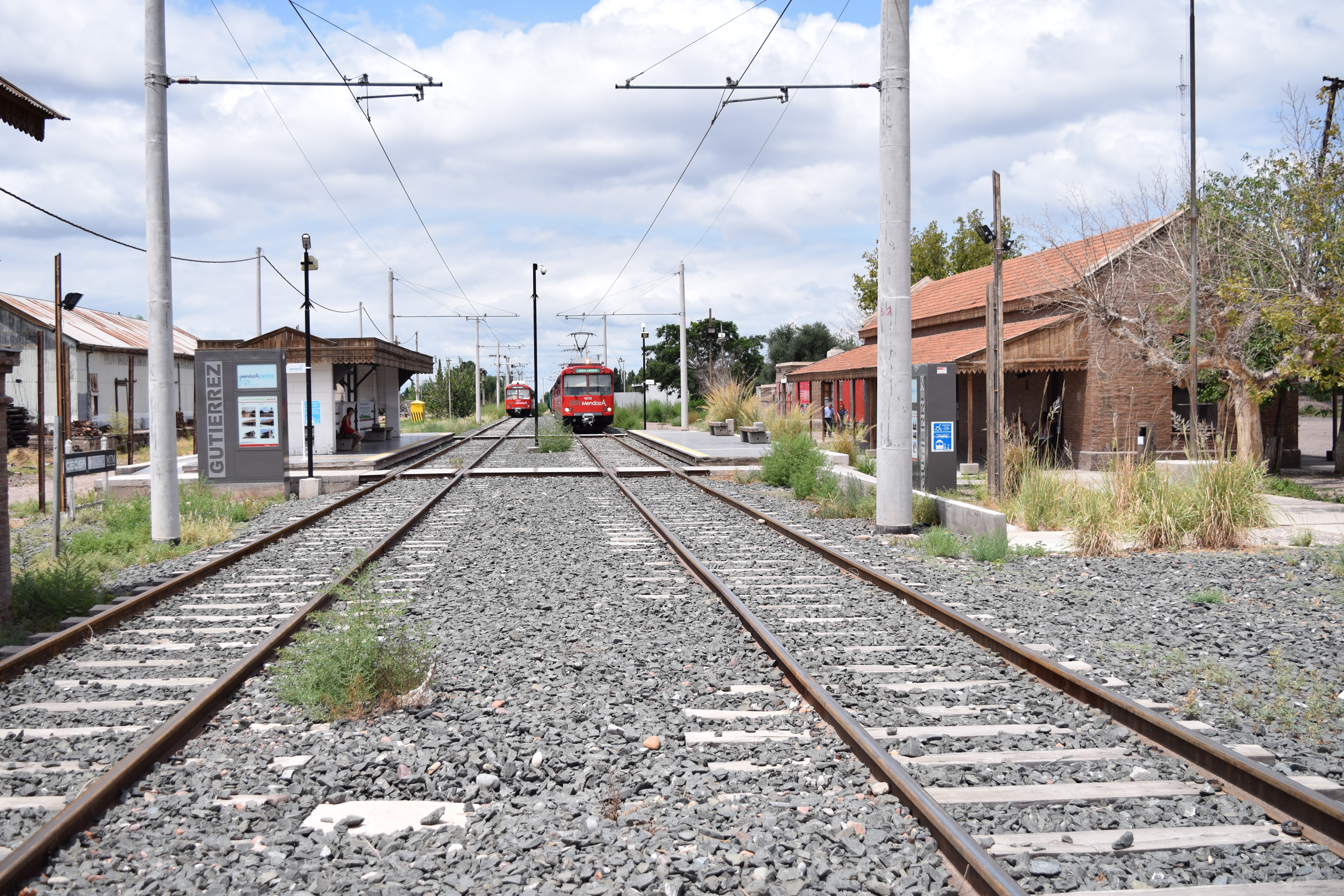

General information
- Location: General Gutiérrez, Mendoza; Argentina
- Coordinates: 32.959652°S 68.782693°W
- Transit authority: Sociedad de Transporte Mendoza
- Platforms: 2 side platforms
- Tracks: 2

History
- Opened: 1885
- Closed: 1993
- Rebuilt: 28 February 2012

Services
Preceding station	STM	Following station
Terminus	Metrotranvía Mendoza	Maza towards Avellaneda
Location

General Gutiérrez station, also known simply as Gutiérrez station, is a light rail station located in the town of General Gutiérrez, Maipú Department, Mendoza Province, Argentina. The station opened on 28 February 2012, as part of Metrotranvía Mendoza.

== History ==
In 1885, the station was inaugurated by the Buenos Aires and Pacific Railway, as part of the branch of Retiro to Mendoza. The station was re-opened on 28 February 2012, as one of the terminals of the Metrotranvía Mendoza.

On 9 September 2022, Trenes Argentinos began the inspection of tracks so that the station becomes the new western terminus of long-distance passenger service on the Retiro-San Luis-Mendoza line, which currently ends in the city of Justo Daract.

=== Proposed commuter rail ===
As of 2025, the General Gutiérrez station is proposed to be a terminus for the Tren de Cercanías del Este (English: East Commuter Rail), a planned commuter rail line from General Gutiérrez to the Libertador San Martín station in Junín.

== Images ==
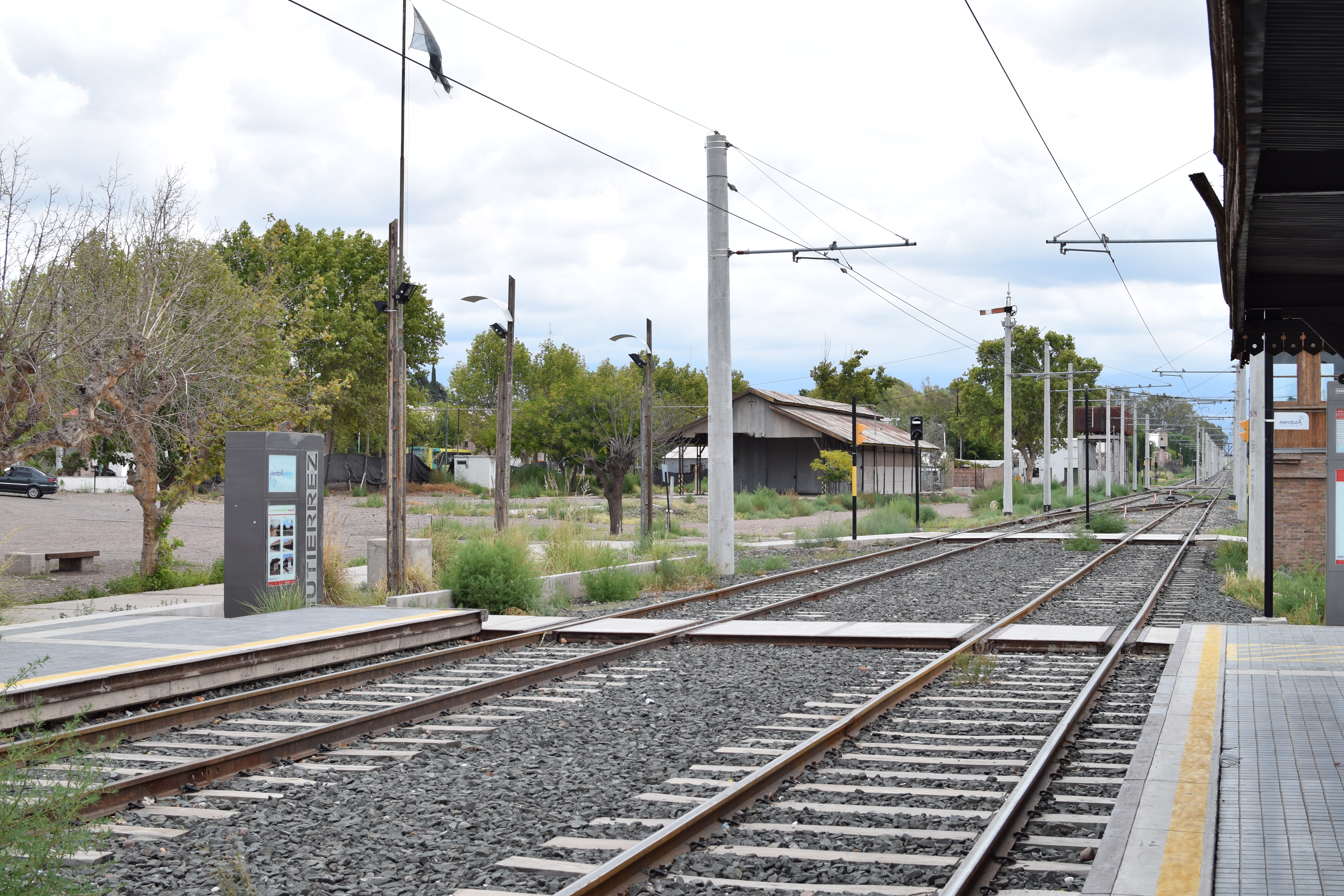

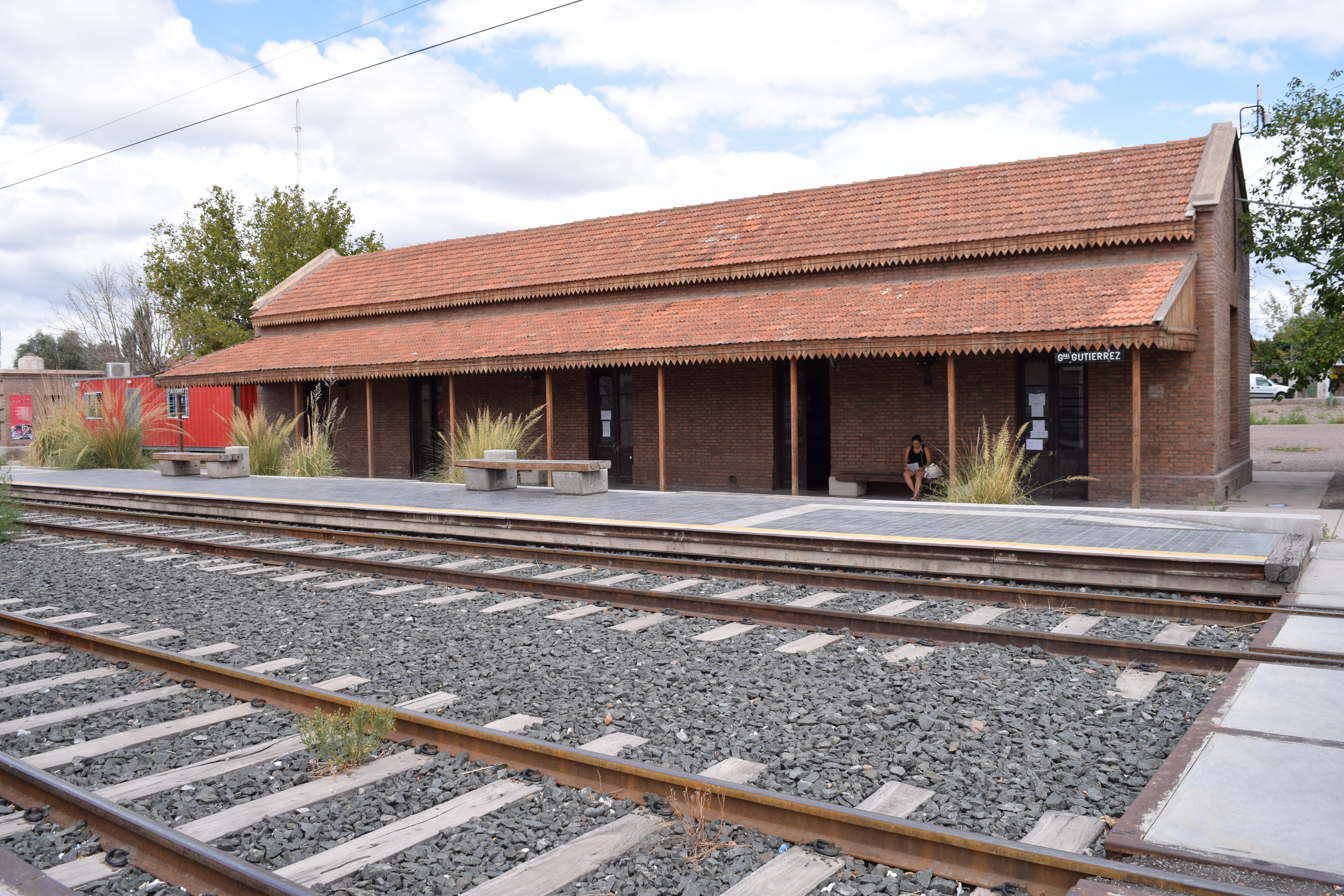

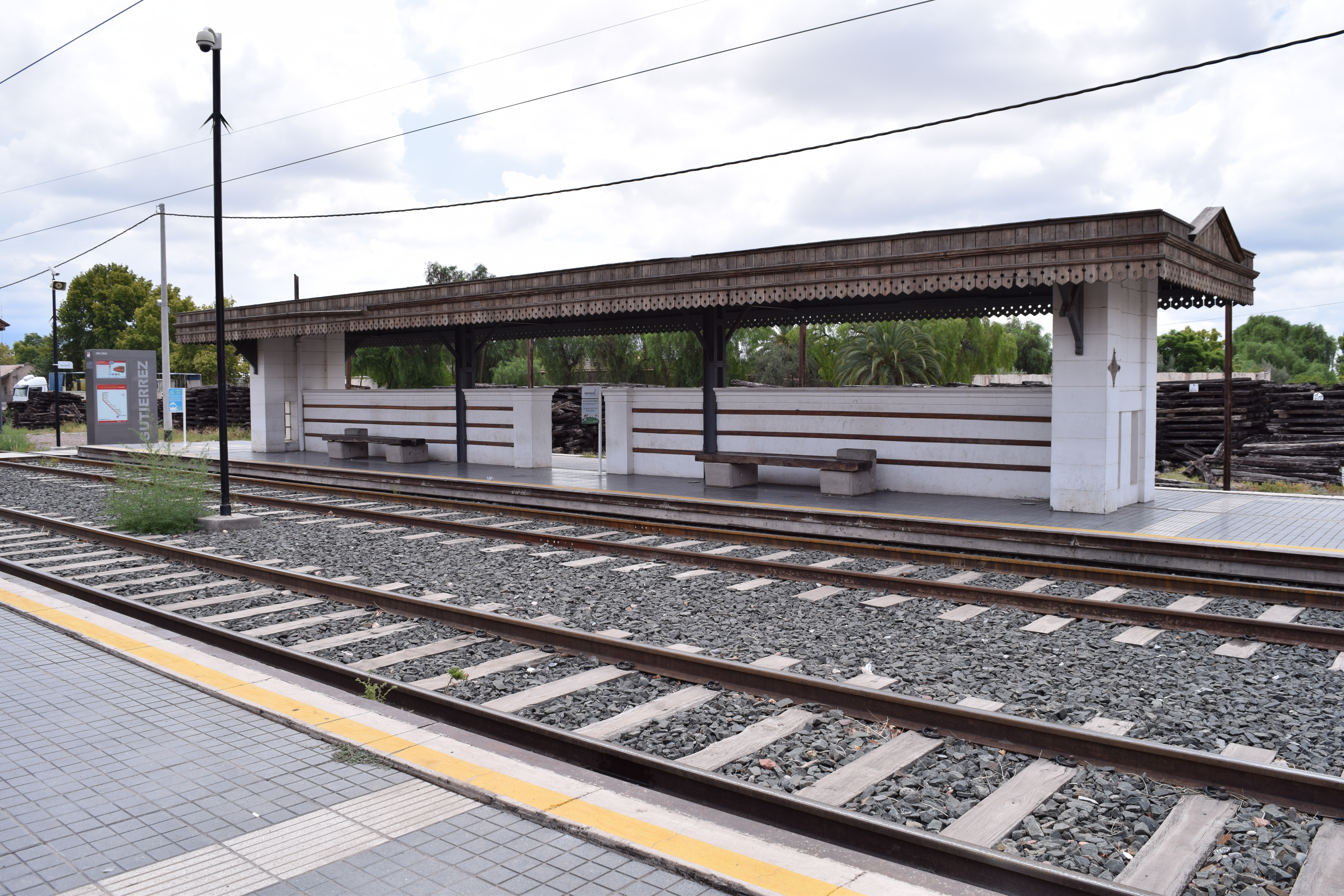

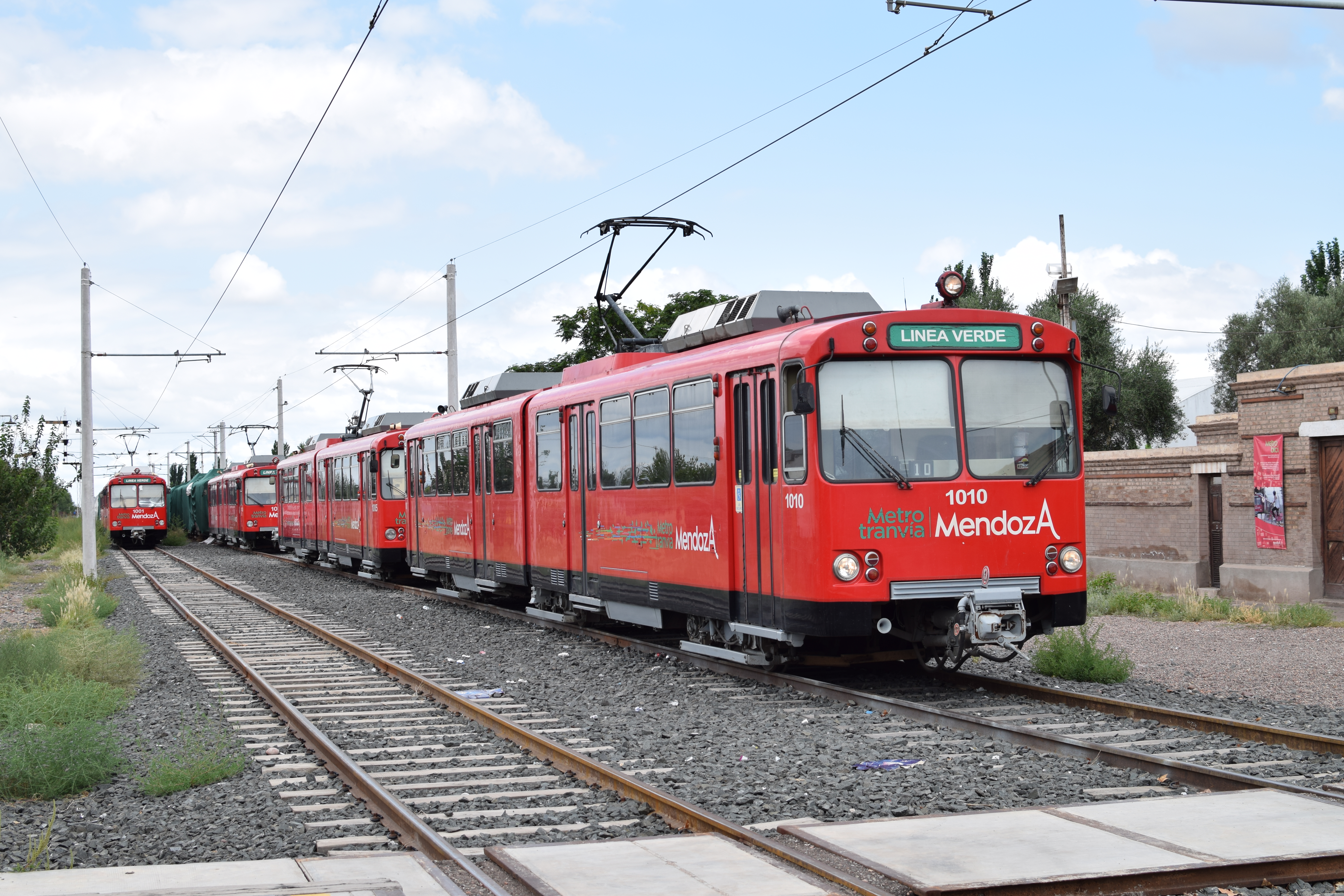

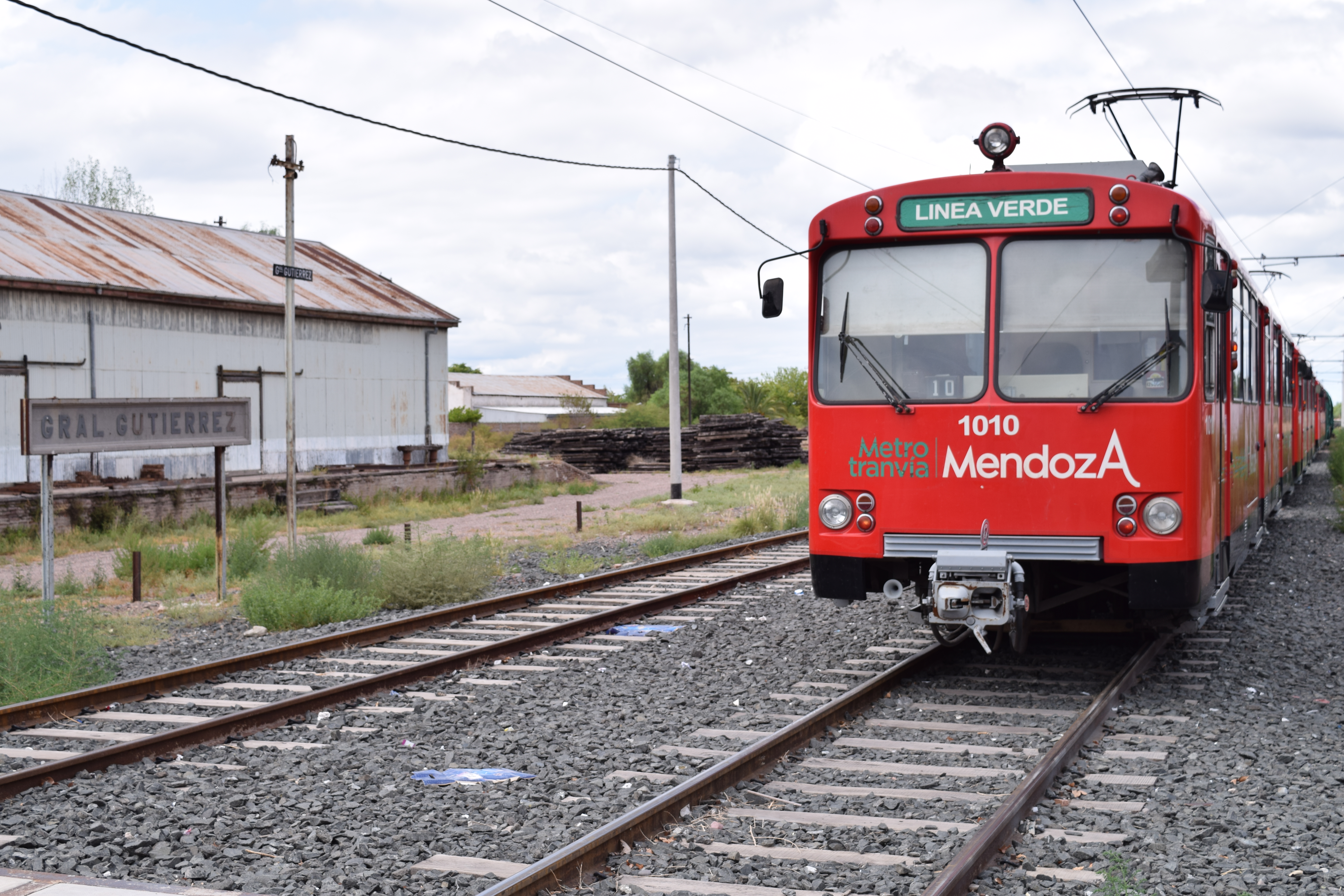

== See also ==
- General Gutiérrez
- Metrotranvía Mendoza
- General San Martín Railway
- Retiro-San Luis-Mendoza line
