= Maipú Department, Mendoza =

Maipú Departamento Maipú
- Department
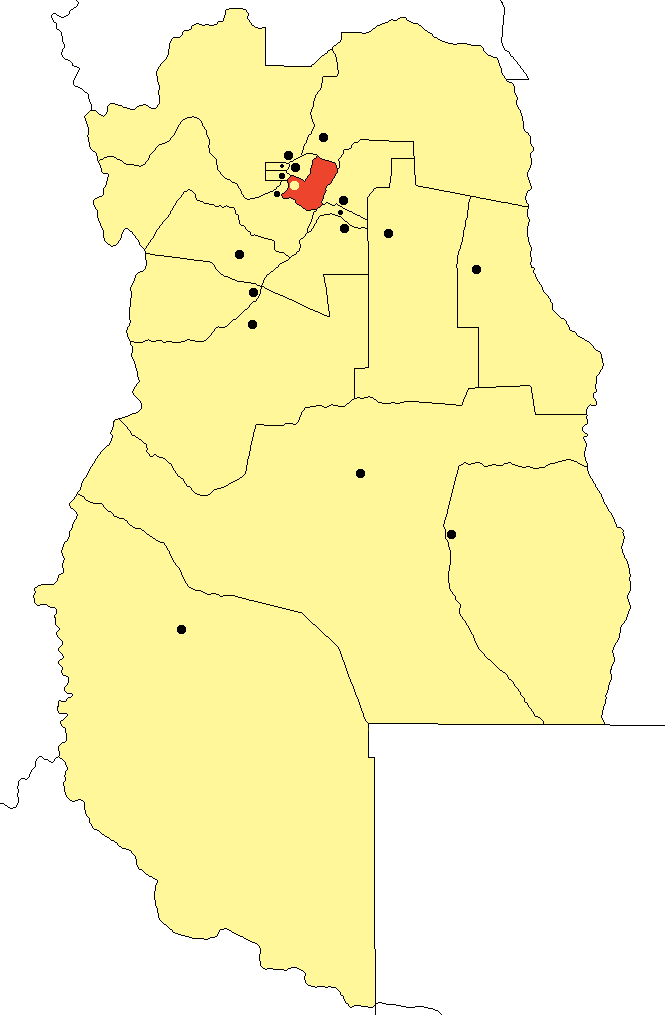
- location of Maipú Department in Mendoza Province
- Coordinates: 32°58′S 68°46′W
- Country: Argentina
- Established: May 31, 1858
- Founder: Juan Cornelio Moyano (Governor of Mendoza)
- Seat: Maipú.

Government
  - Intendant: Matías Stevanato, PJ

Area
  - Total: 617 km^{2} (238 sq mi)

Population (2022 census [INDEC])
  - Total: 219,402
  - Density: 356/km^{2} (921/sq mi)
- Demonym: maipucino/na
- Postal Code: M5515
- IFAM: MZA009
- Area Code: 0261
- Patron saint: ?
- Website: web.archive.org/web/20080106222401/http://www.maipu.gov.ar/

Maipú Department is a department and municipality located in the north west of Mendoza Province in Argentina.

The department covers 617 km^{2} (238 mi^{2}) and a population of 153,600 (2001 census [INDEC]); its capital is Maipú.

The department was created in 1858 and named in memory of the Battle of Maipú, which took place in Chile, 1818 during the South American Wars of Independence.

== Districts ==
- Maipú
- Coquimbito
- Cruz de Piedra
- Fray Luis Beltrán
- General Gutiérrez
- General Ortega
- Las Barrancas
- Lunlunta
- Luzuriaga
- Rodeo del Medio
- Russell
- San Roque

== Tourism ==
Vineyards in Maipú with the Andes in the background

Maipú is one of the main wine tourism areas of Mendoza, with wineries, a wine museum and olive oil producers open to visitors. Touring the wineries by bicycle is a popular activity, particularly among independent travellers and backpackers, as several wineries and olive farms in the area are a short ride from one another.

== Sport ==
Maipú is home to Deportivo Maipú, a football club that play in the regionalised 3rd Division.

== See also ==
- Mendoza wine
- Independence of Chile
- Independence of Argentina
