= Pellegrini station =

Metrotranvía Mendoza station

Pellegrini station Parador Pellegrini
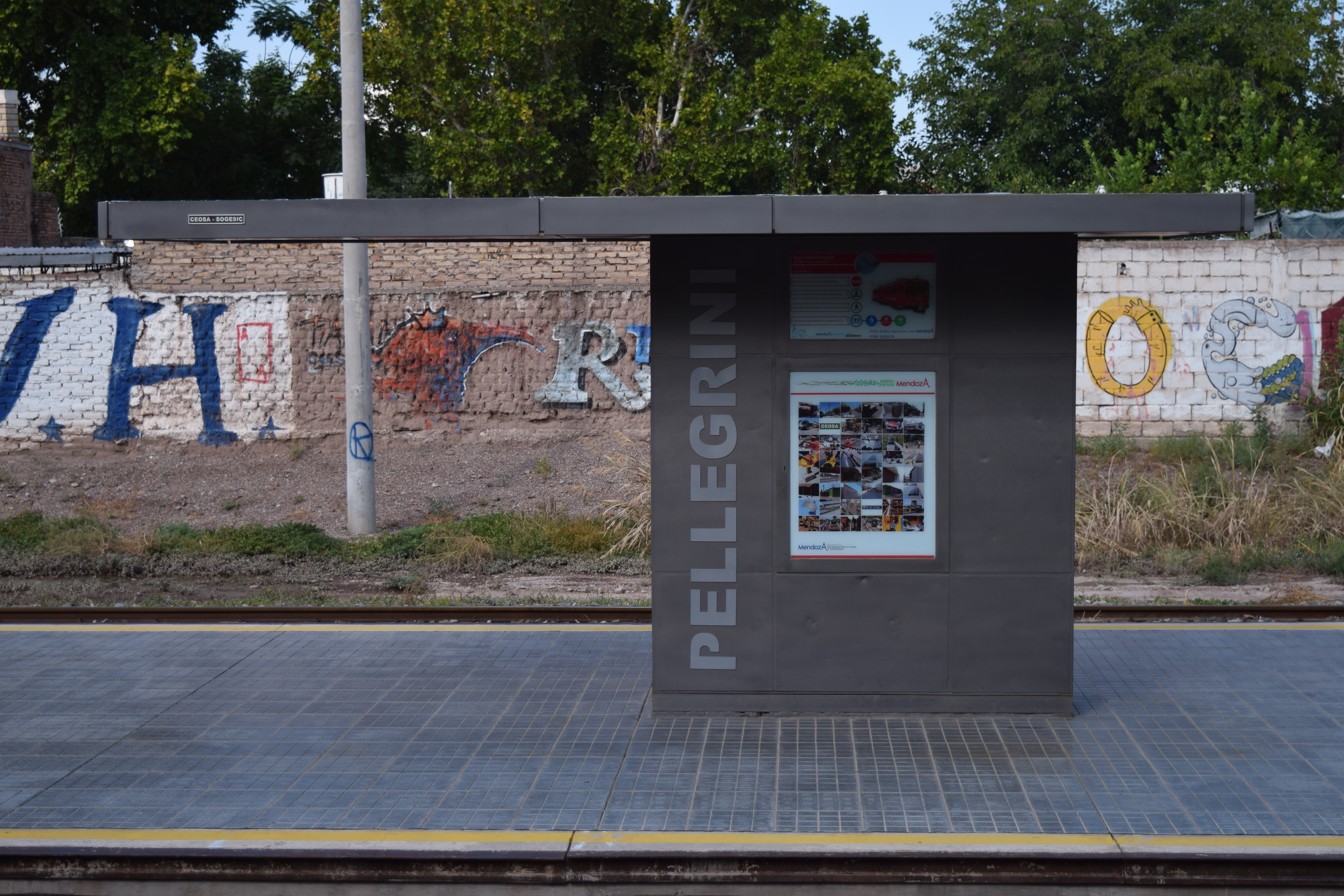

General information
- Location: Pascual Segura con Pellegrini; Mendoza; Argentina
- Coordinates: 32.908726°S 68.851962°W
- Transit authority: Sociedad de Transporte Mendoza
- Platforms: 1 island platform
- Tracks: 2

History
- Opened: 28 February 2012

Services
Preceding station	STM	Following station
San Martín towards General Gutiérrez	Metrotranvía Mendoza	25 de Mayo towards Avellaneda
Proposed services
Preceding station	STM	Following station
San Martín towards General Gutiérrez	Metrotranvía Mendoza	25 de Mayo towards Aeropuerto Internacional El Plumelillo
Chacabuco towards Luján de Cuyo	Metrotranvía Mendoza; Luján de Cuyo branch (Opening 2027)	25 de Mayo towards Aeropuerto Internacional El Plumelillo

Pellegrini is a light rail station located at the intersections of Pascual Segura and Pellegrini Streets in the City of Mendoza, Capital Department, Mendoza Province, Argentina.

== Images ==
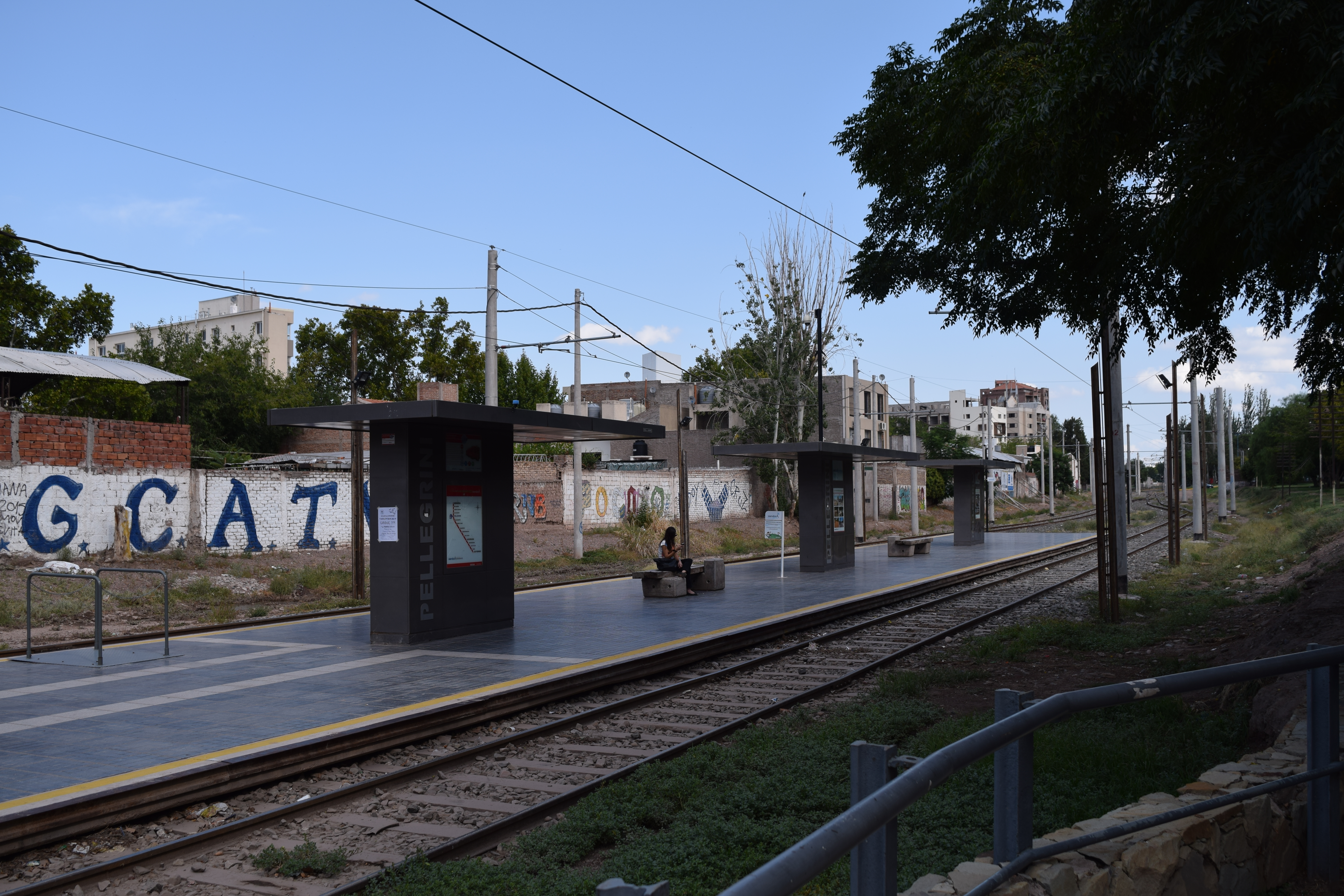

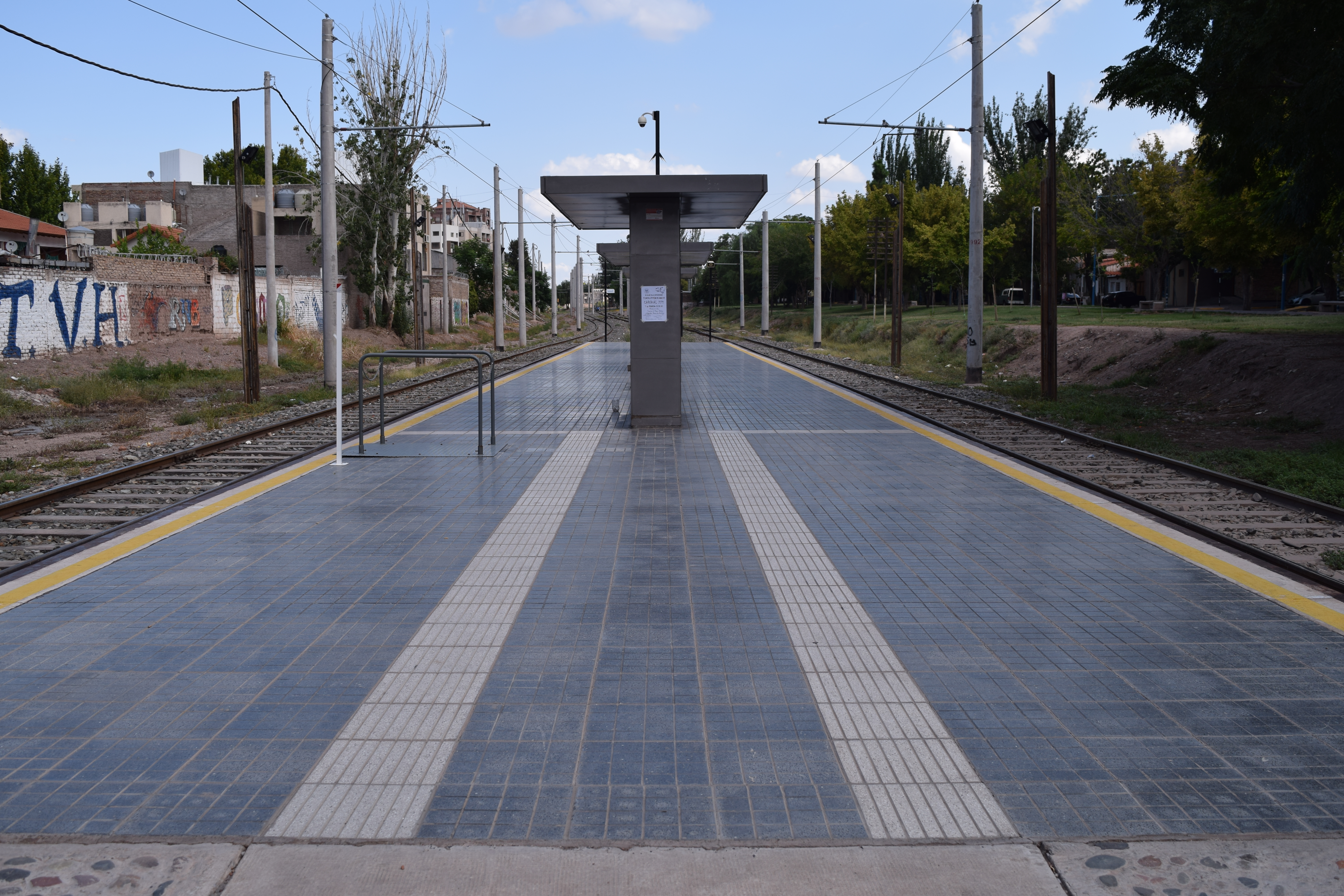

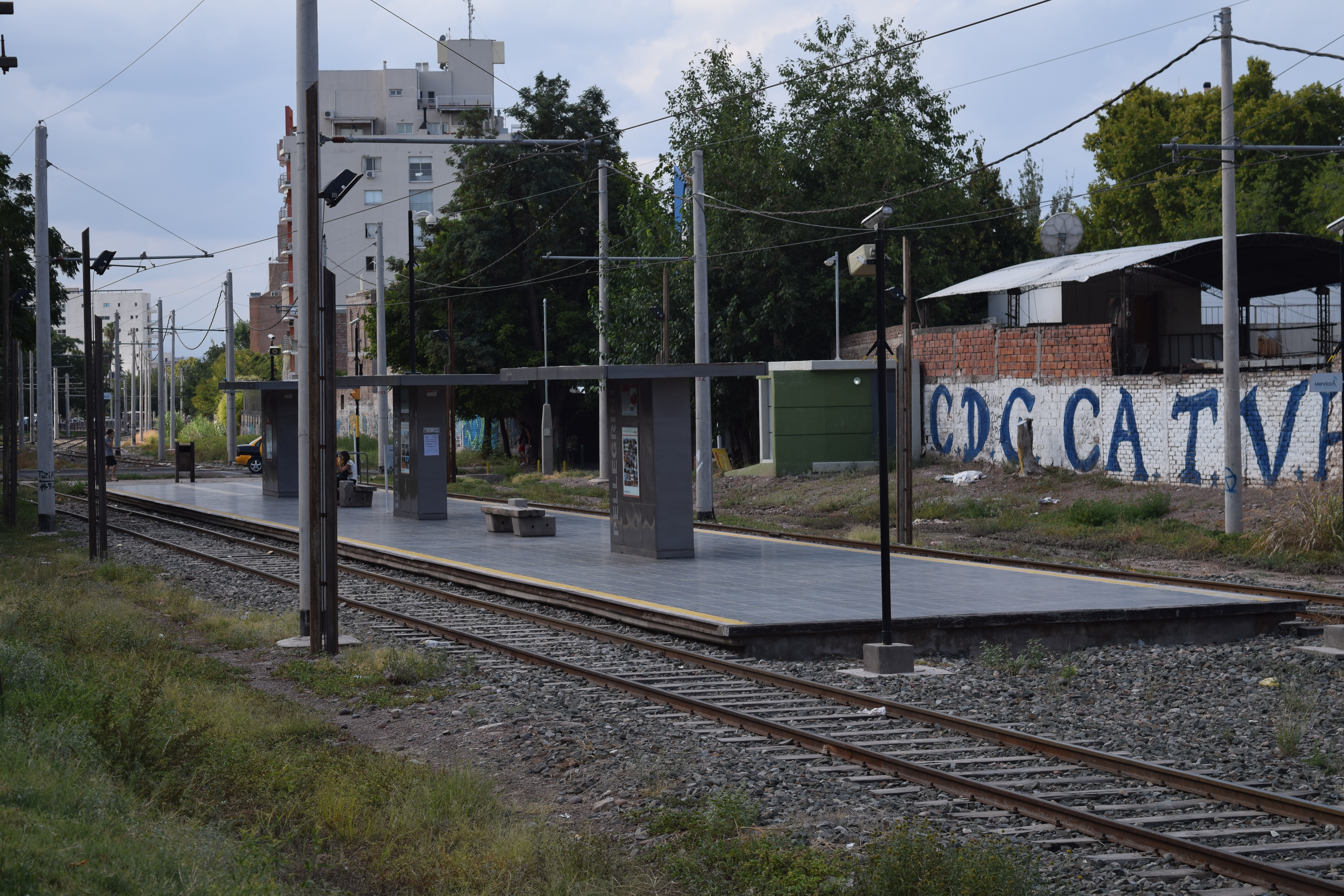
