= Pedro Molina station =

Metrotranvía Mendoza station

Pedro Molina station Parador Pedro Molina
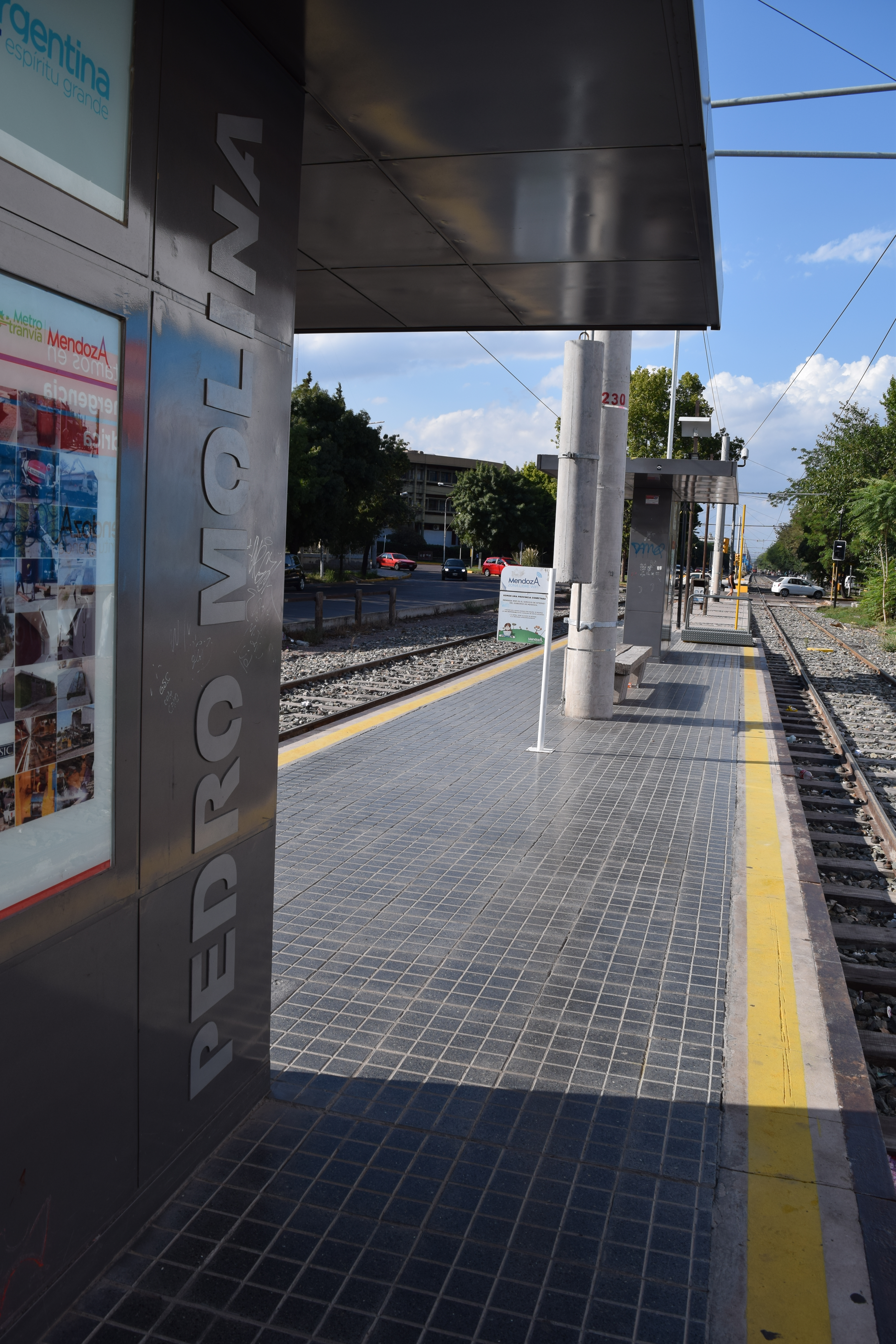

General information
- Location: Av. Belgrano con Av. Pedro Molina; Mendoza; Argentina
- Coordinates: 32.896682°S 68.851825°W
- Transit authority: Sociedad de Transporte Mendoza
- Platforms: 1 island platform
- Tracks: 2

History
- Opened: 28 February 2012

Services
Preceding station	STM	Following station
25 de Mayo towards General Gutiérrez	Metrotranvía Mendoza	Belgrano towards Avellaneda

Pedro Molina is a light rail station located at the intersection of Avenida Belgrano and Avenida Pedro Molina in the City of Mendoza, Capital Department, Province of Mendoza, Argentina.

== Images ==
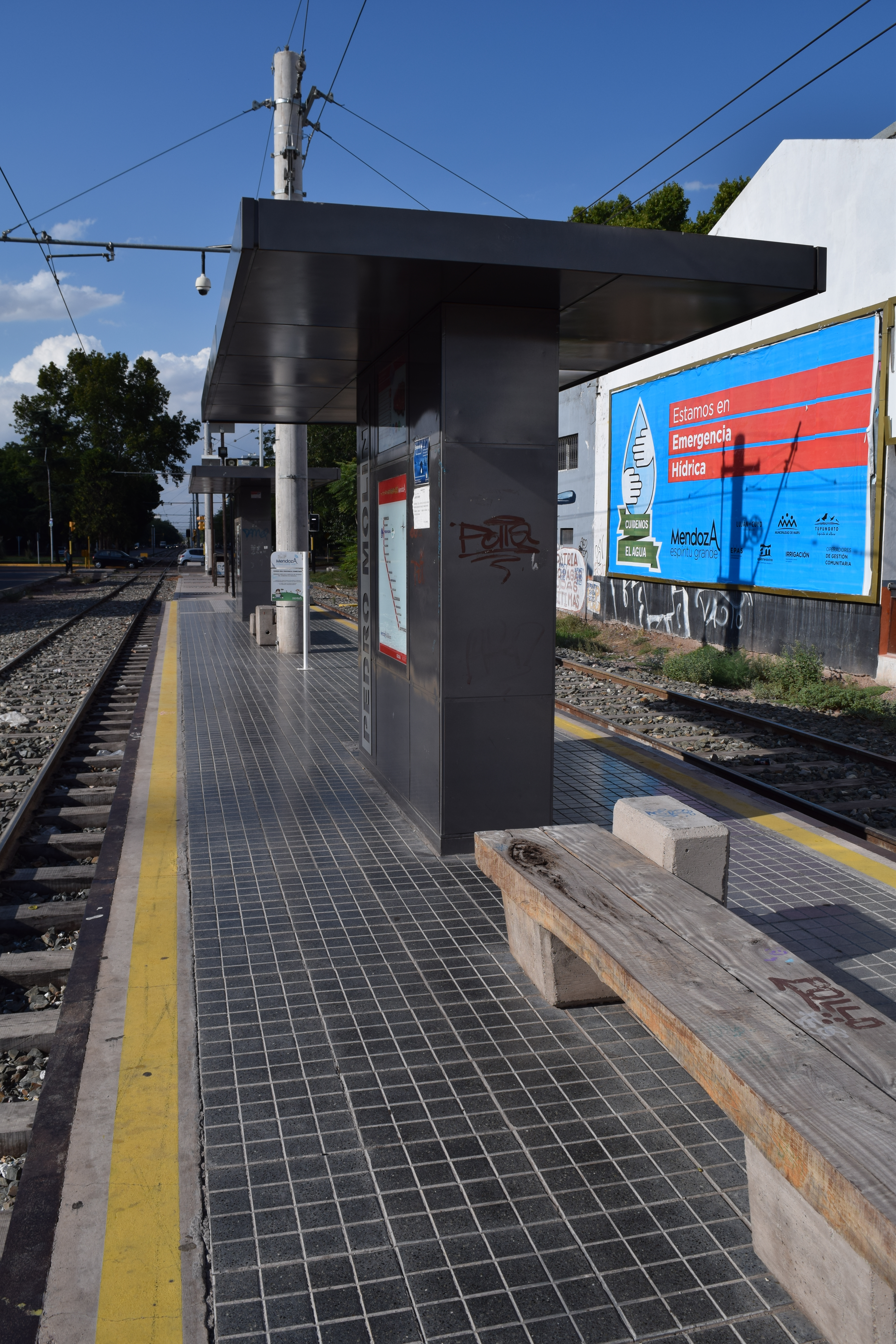

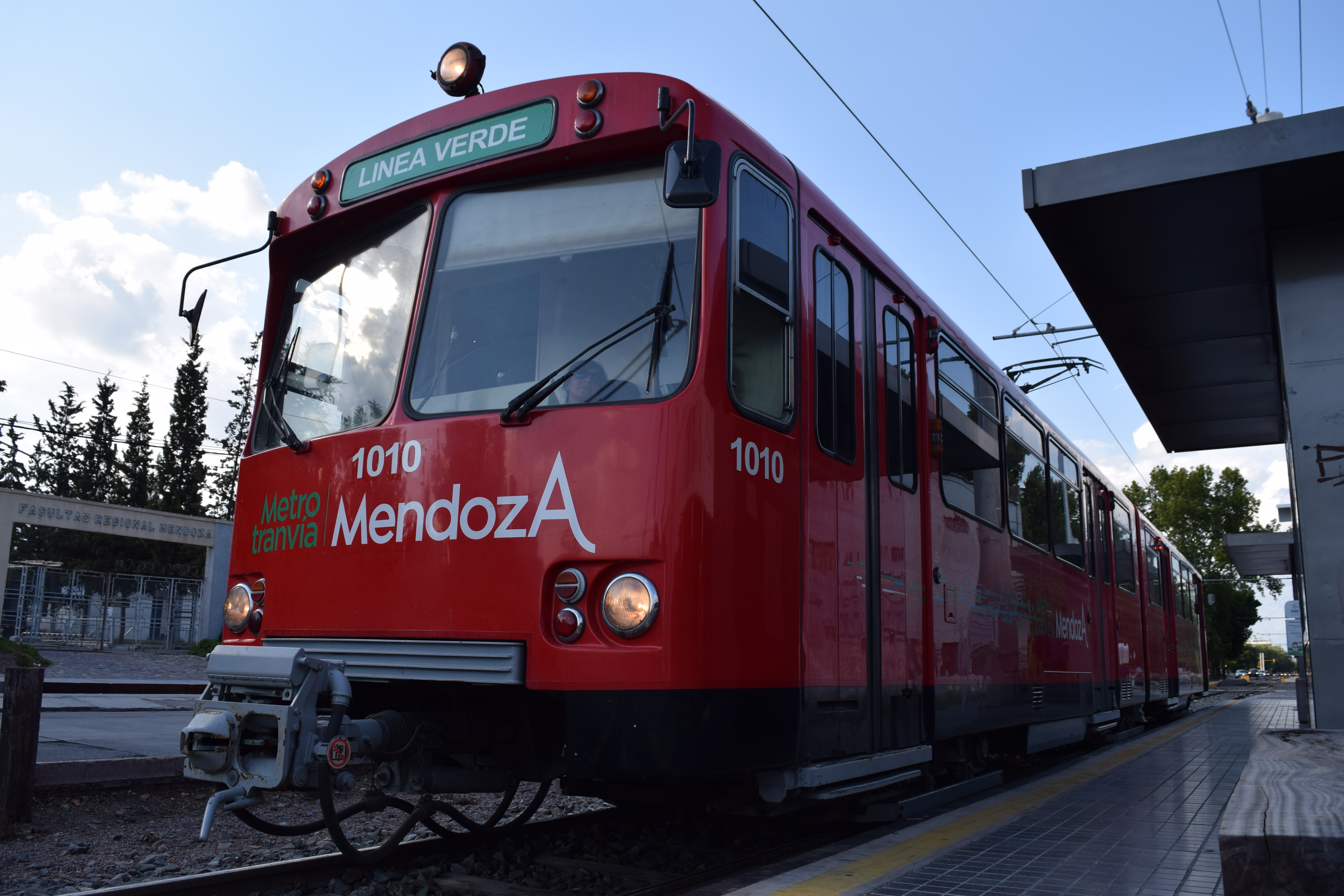
