= Belgrano station =

Metrotranvía Mendoza station

Belgrano station Parador Belgrano
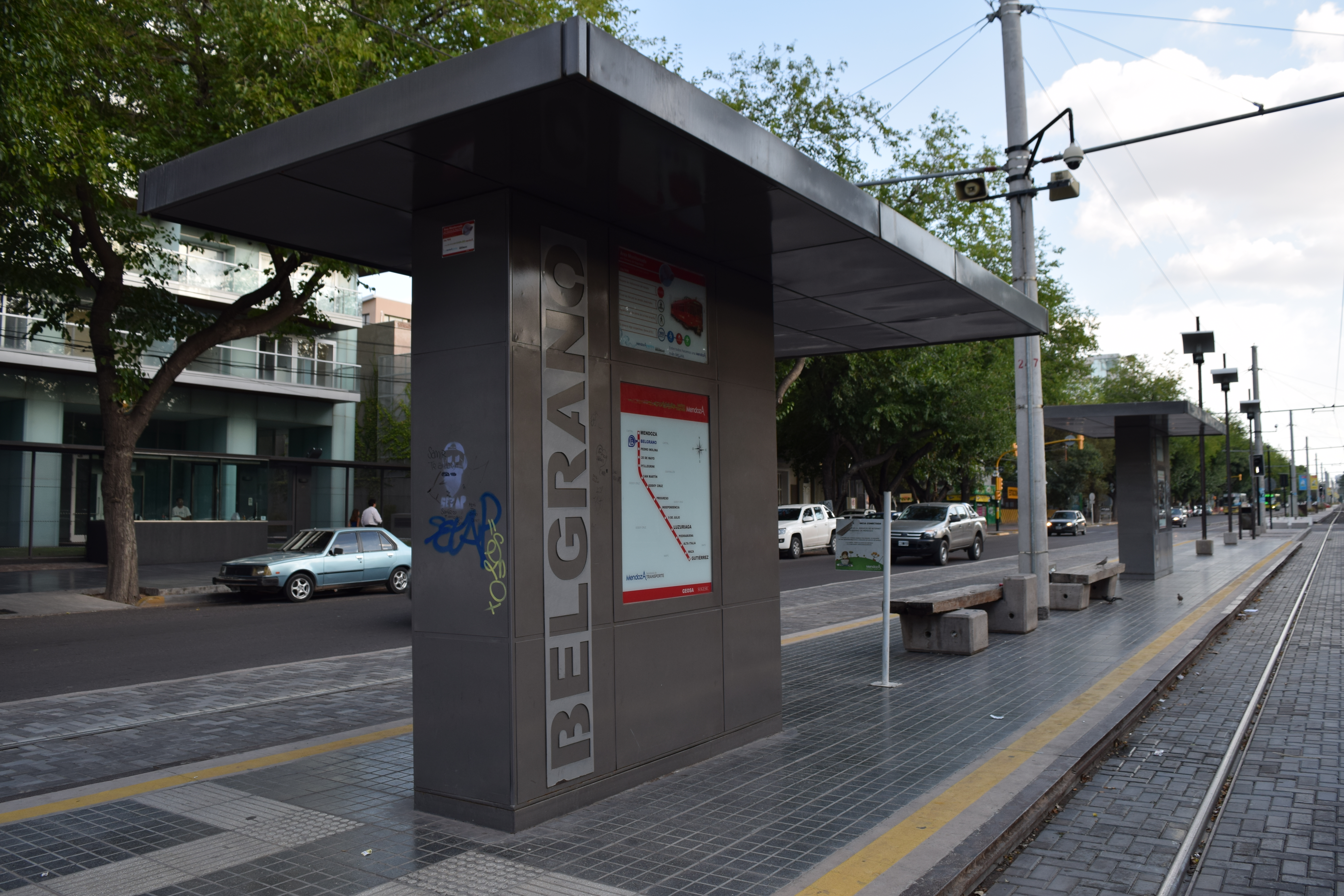

General information
- Location: Av. Belgrano con Reconquista; Mendoza; Argentina
- Coordinates: 32.890350°S 68.850168°W
- Transit authority: Sociedad de Transporte Mendoza
- Platforms: 1 island platform
- Tracks: 2

History
- Opened: 28 February 2012 (ceremonial inauguration); 8 October 2012 (full opening)

Services
Preceding station	STM	Following station
Pedro Molina towards General Gutiérrez	Metrotranvía Mendoza	Mendoza towards Avellaneda

Belgrano is a light rail station at the intersection of Avenida Belgrano and Martín Zapata/Montevideo in the City of Mendoza, Capital Department, Province of Mendoza, Argentina.

== History ==
The station was officially inaugurated on 28 February 2012, along with the Metrotranvía Mendoza. However, full revenue service did not begin until 8 October that year (see the reason).

Belgrano is an intermediate service station on the original Metrotranvía Mendoza section, linking General Gutiérrez station and Mendoza station.

== Images ==
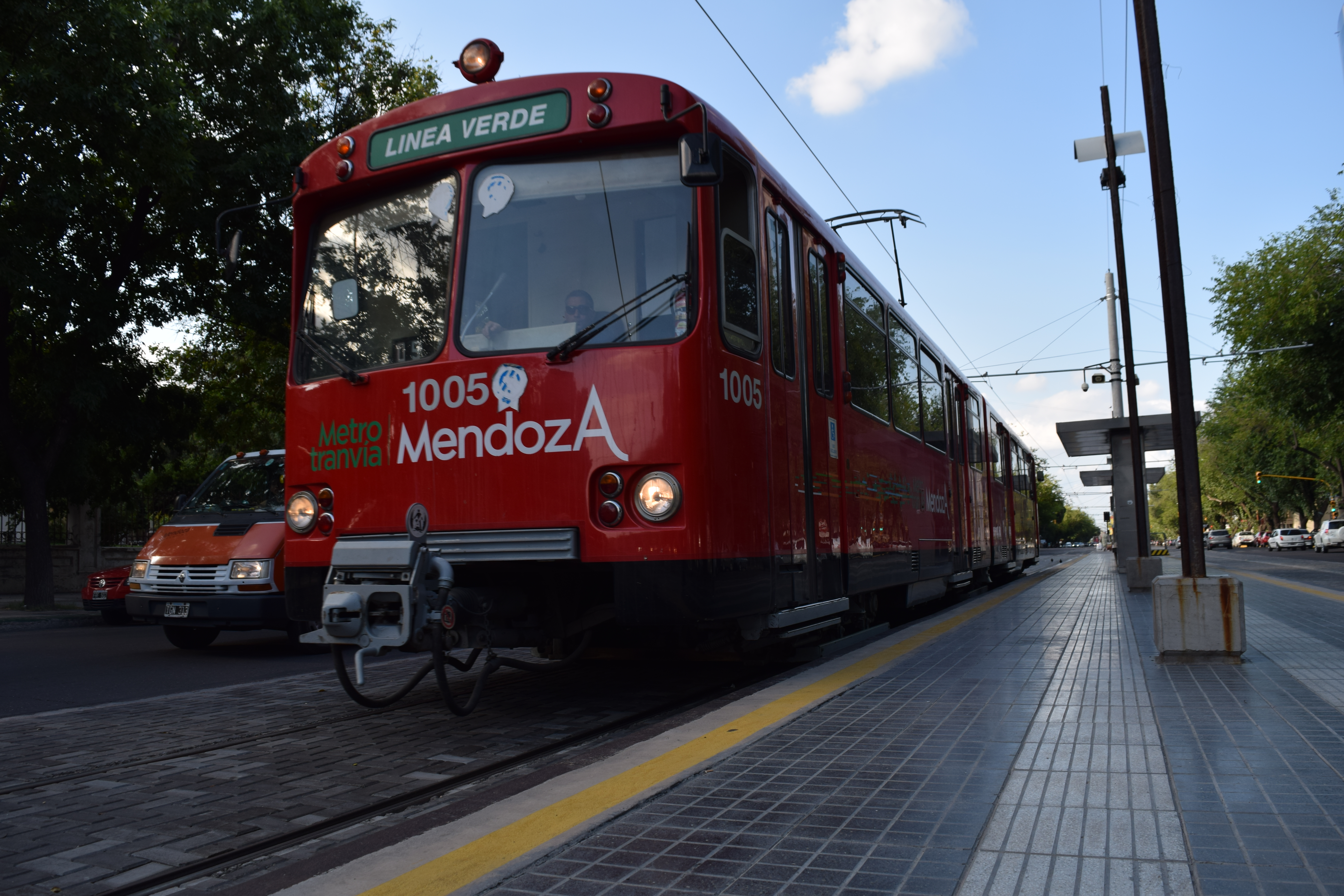

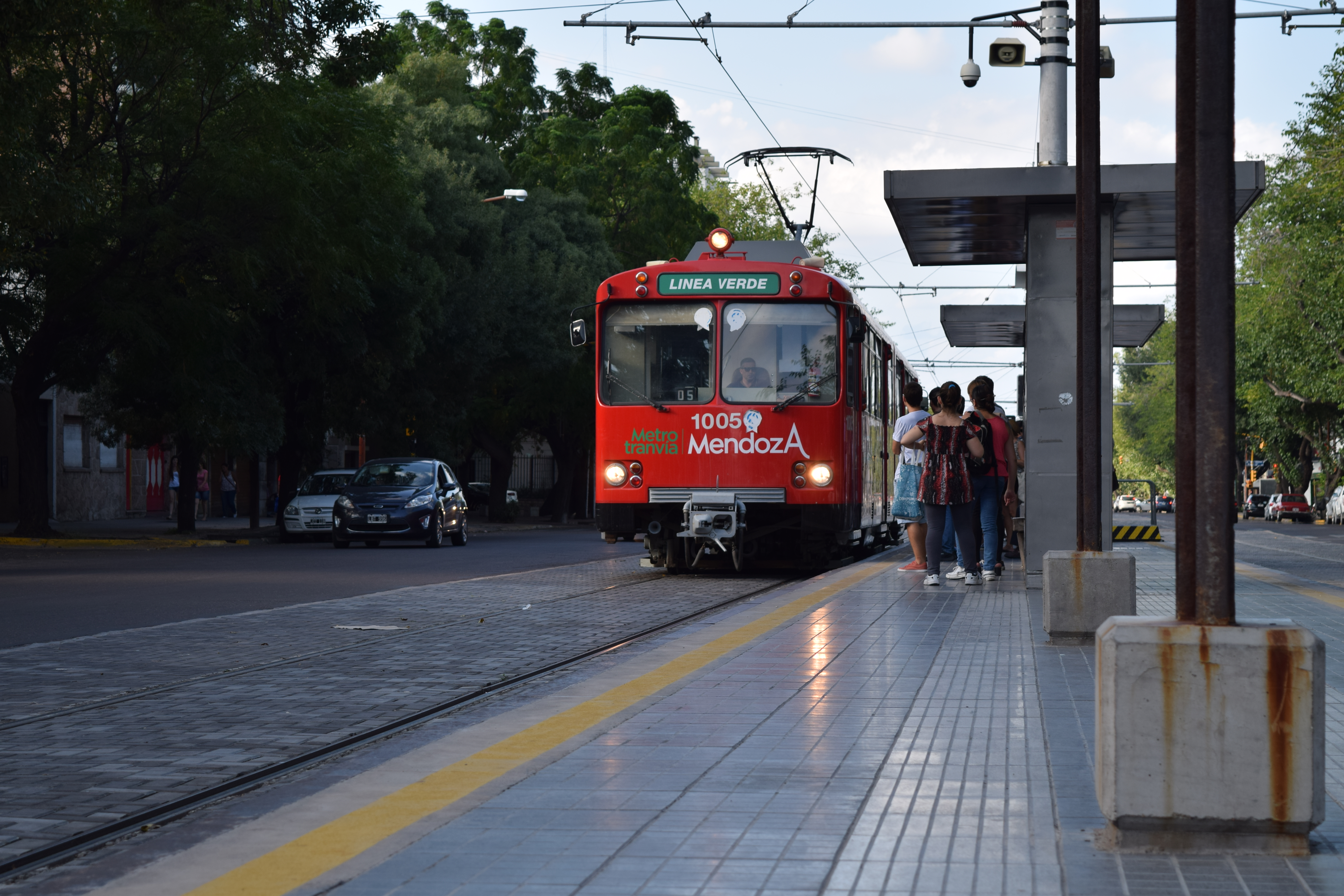
