= 25 de Mayo station =

Metrotranvía Mendoza station

25 de Mayo station Parador 25 de Mayo
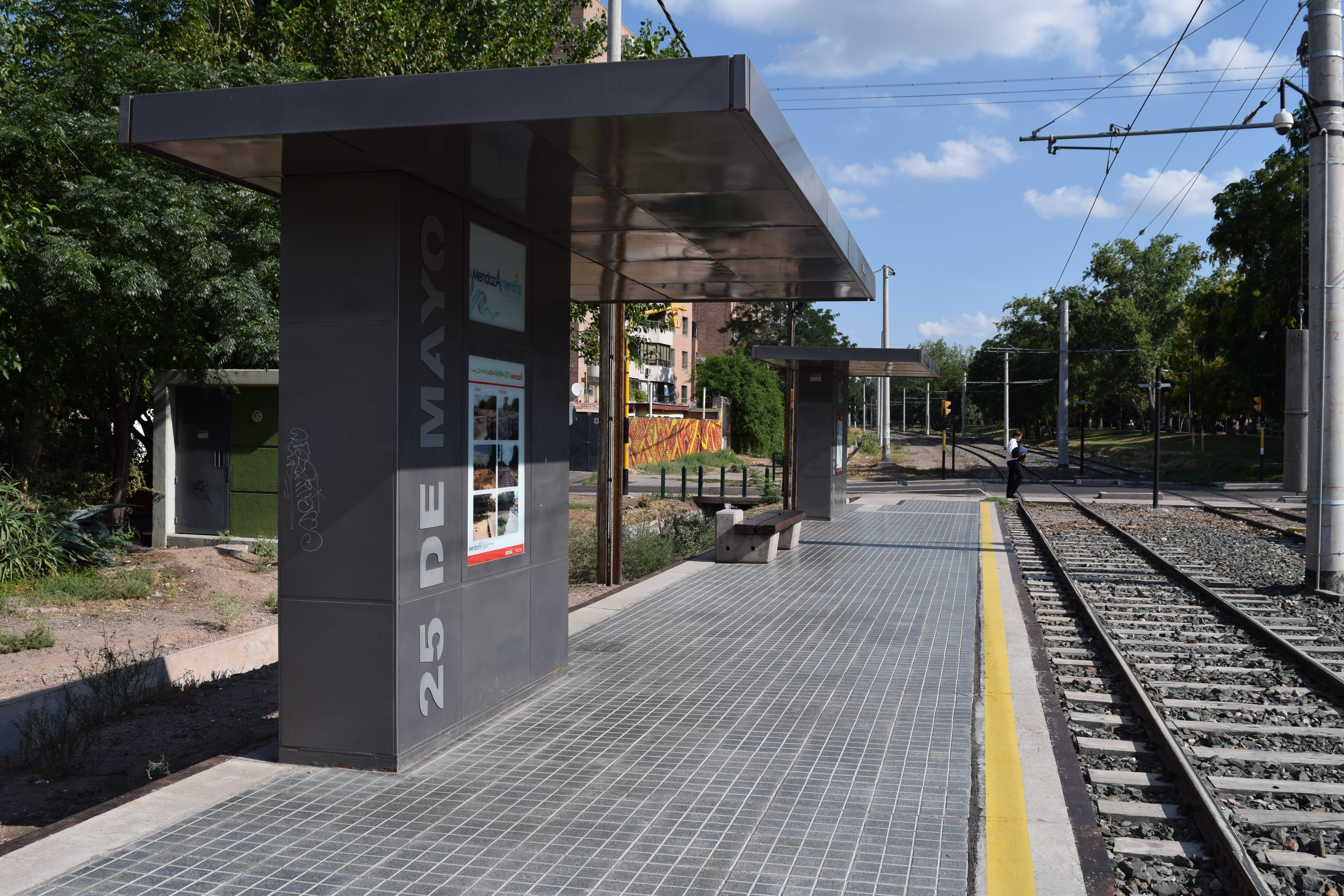

General information
- Location: Pascual Segura con 25 de Mayo; Mendoza; Argentina
- Coordinates: 32.904542°S 68.852987°W
- Transit authority: Sociedad de Transporte Mendoza
- Platforms: 2 side platforms
- Tracks: 2

History
- Opened: 28 February 2012

Services
Preceding station	STM	Following station
Pellegrini towards General Gutiérrez	Metrotranvía Mendoza	Pedro Molina towards Avellaneda
Location

25 de Mayo is a light rail station located on the intersection of Calle Pascual Segura y 25 de Mayo in Mendoza, Capital Department, Mendoza Province, Argentina.

== Images ==
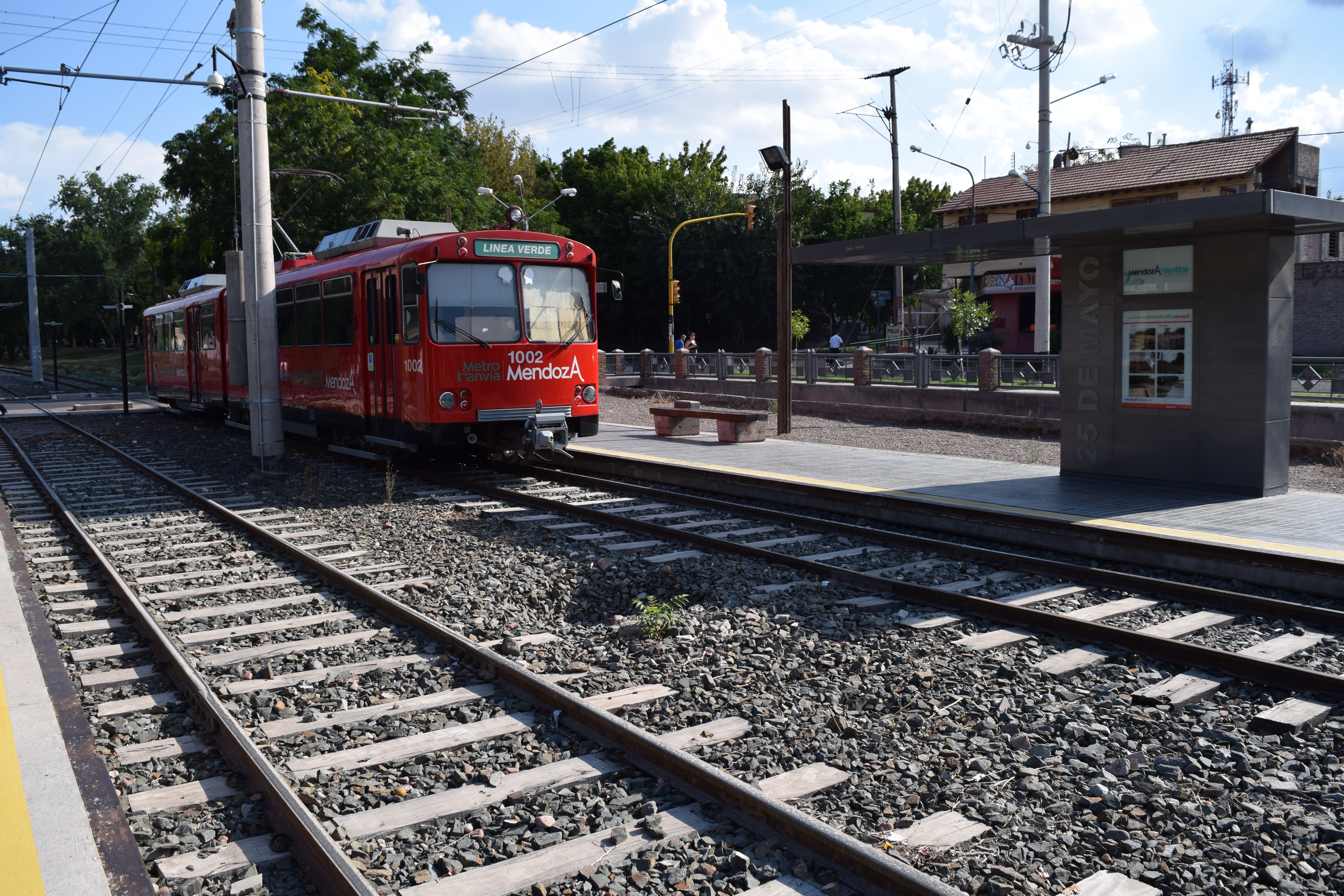

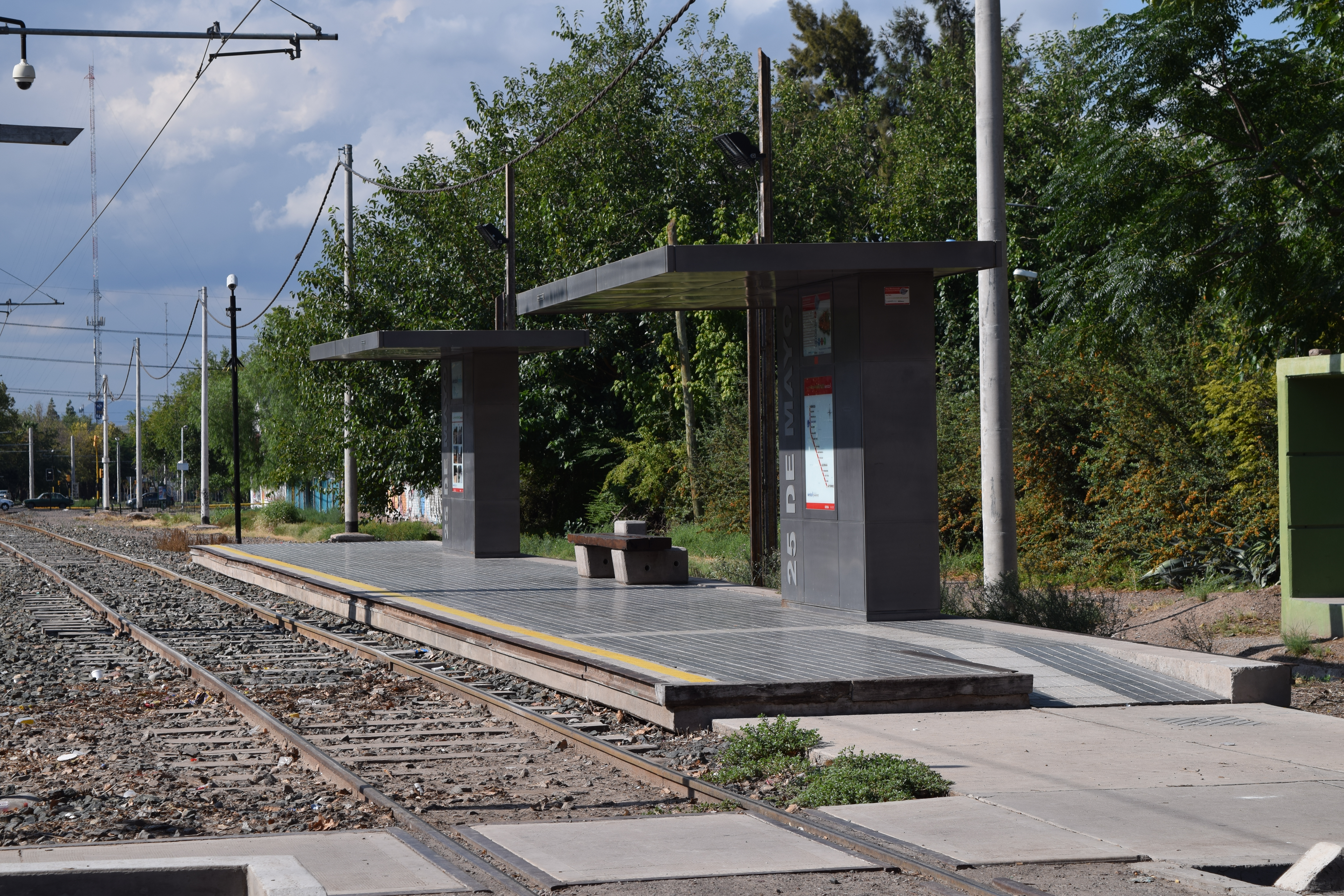

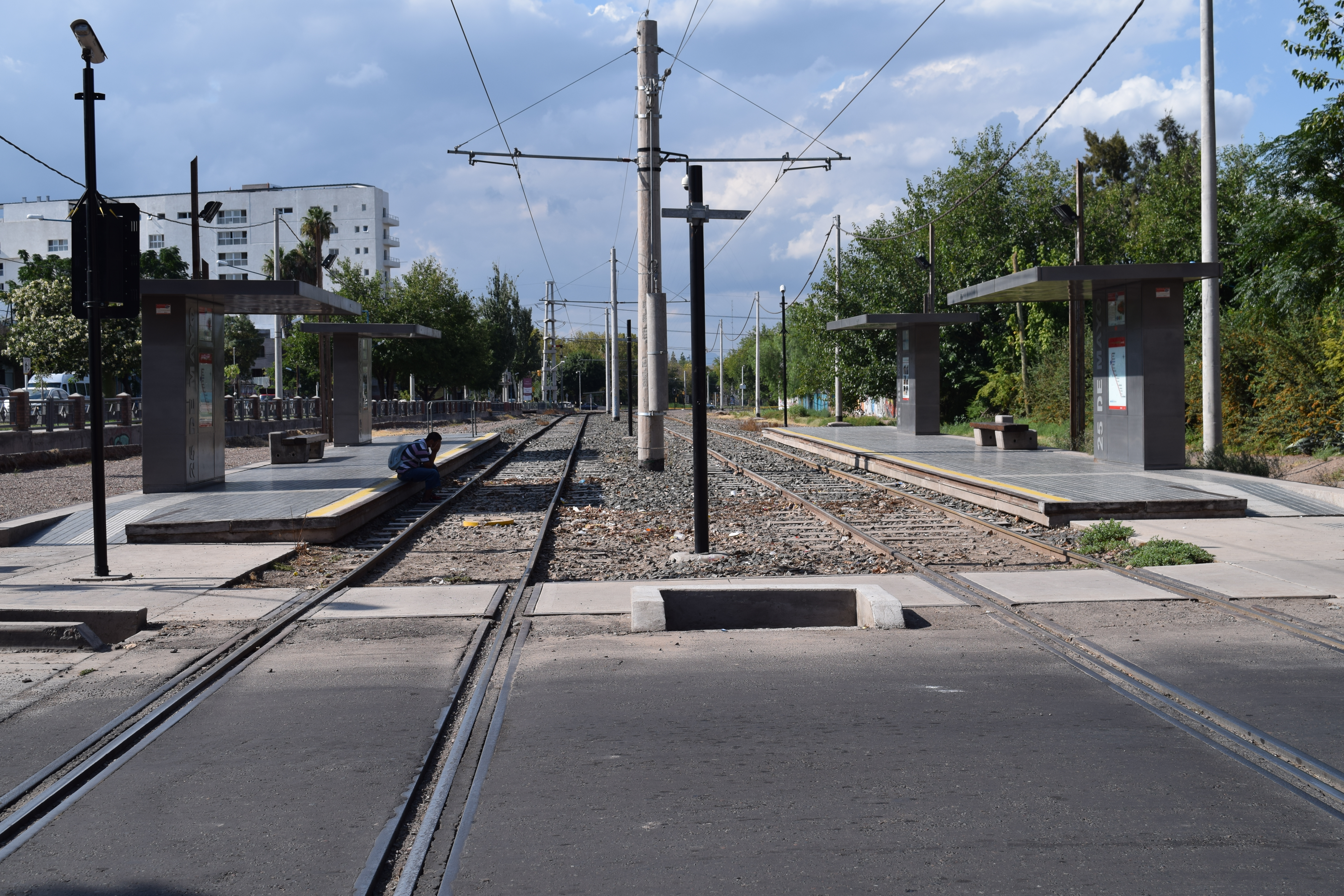

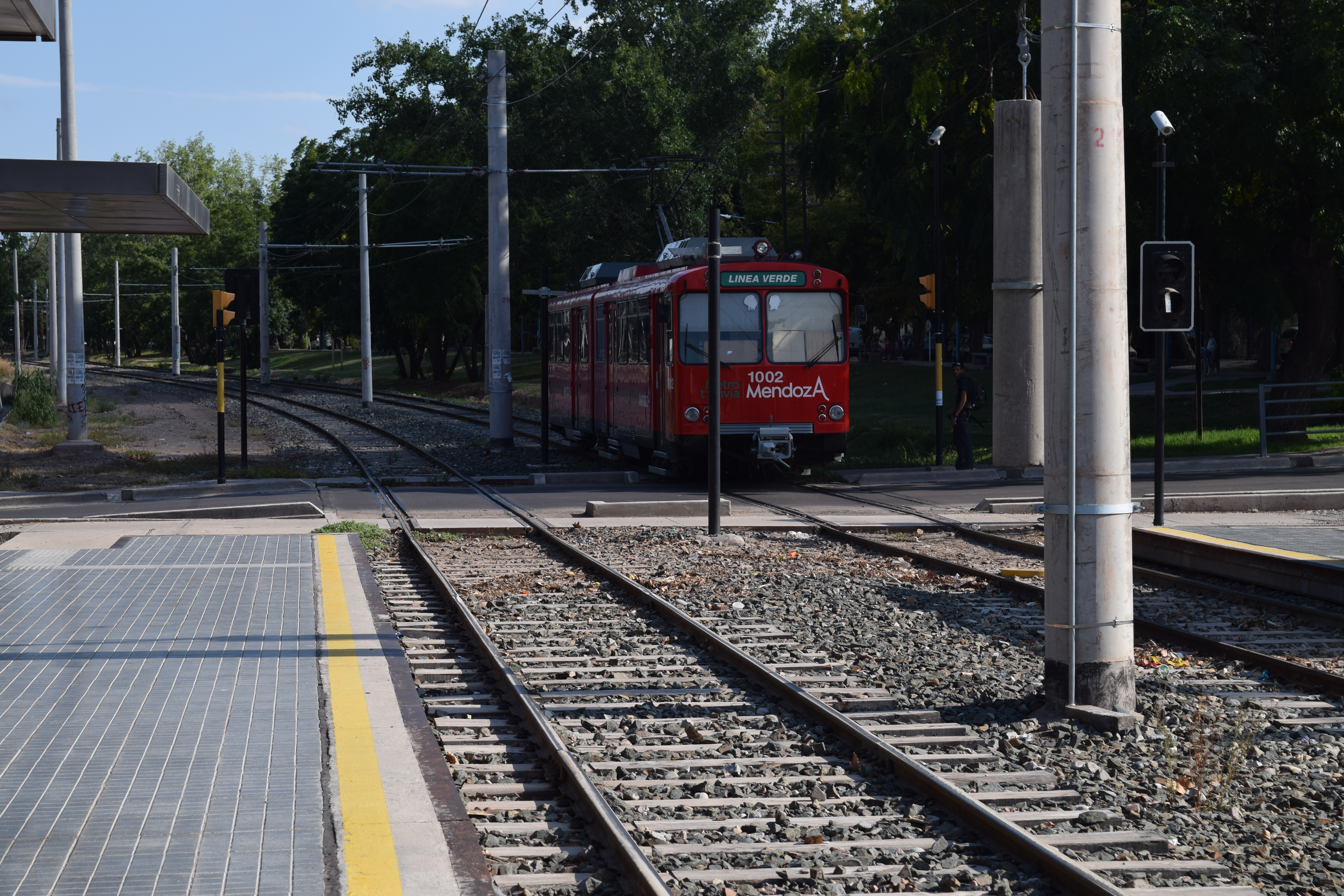
