= San Martín station (Mendoza) =

Metrotranvía Mendoza station

San Martín station Parador San Martín
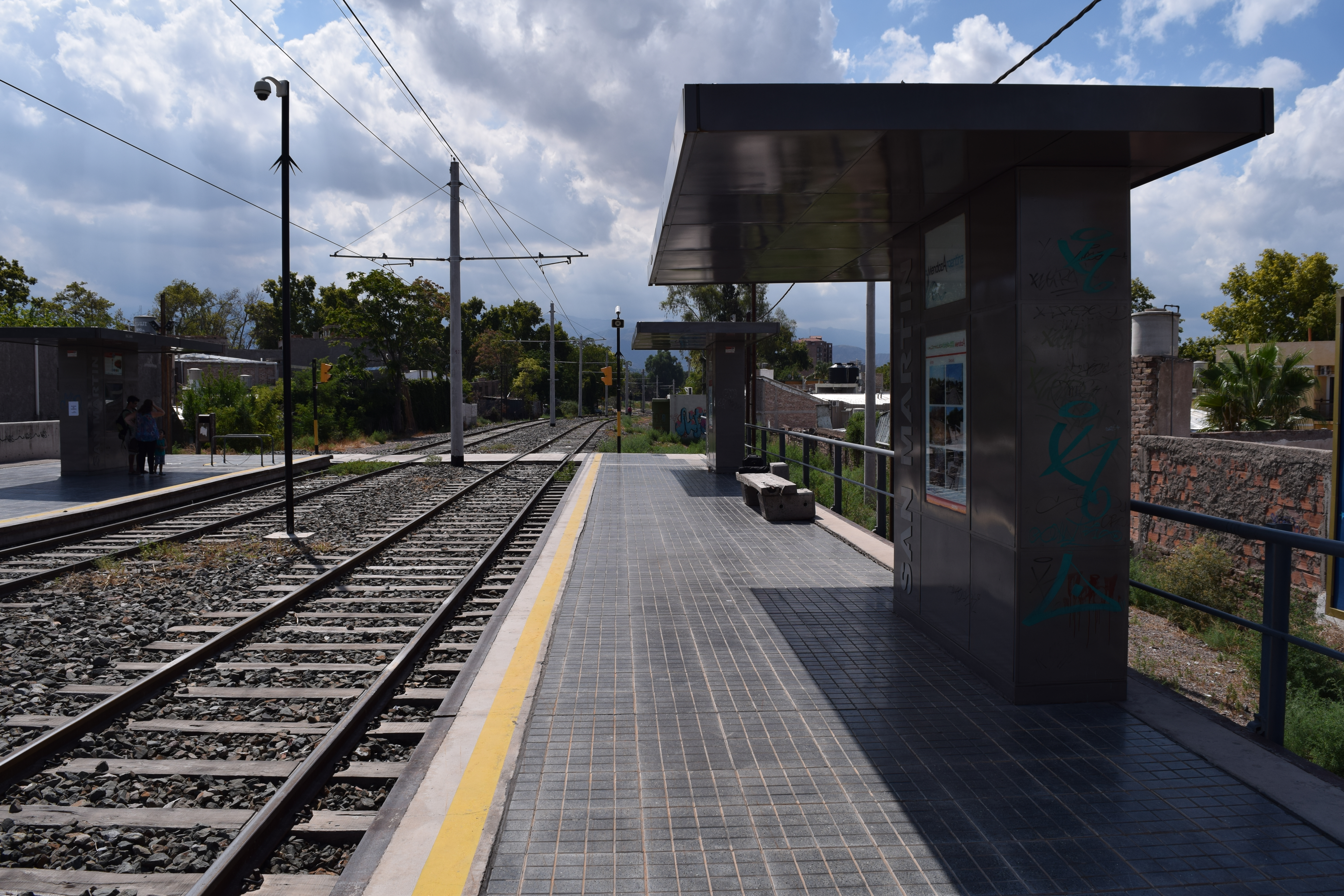

General information
- Location: Calle Anzorena and Avenida San Martín; Mendoza; Argentina
- Coordinates: 32.915984°S 68.846470°W
- Transit authority: Sociedad de Transporte Mendoza
- Platforms: 2 side platforms
- Tracks: 2

History
- Opened: 28 February 2012

Services
Preceding station	STM	Following station
Godoy Cruz towards General Gutiérrez	Metrotranvía Mendoza	Pellegrini towards Avellaneda

Parador San Martín is a light rail station located on the intersection of Calle Anzorena and Avenida San Martín in Godoy Cruz, Godoy Cruz Department, Mendoza Province, Argentina. It opened in 2012, as part of the first section of the Metrotranvía Mendoza

== Images ==
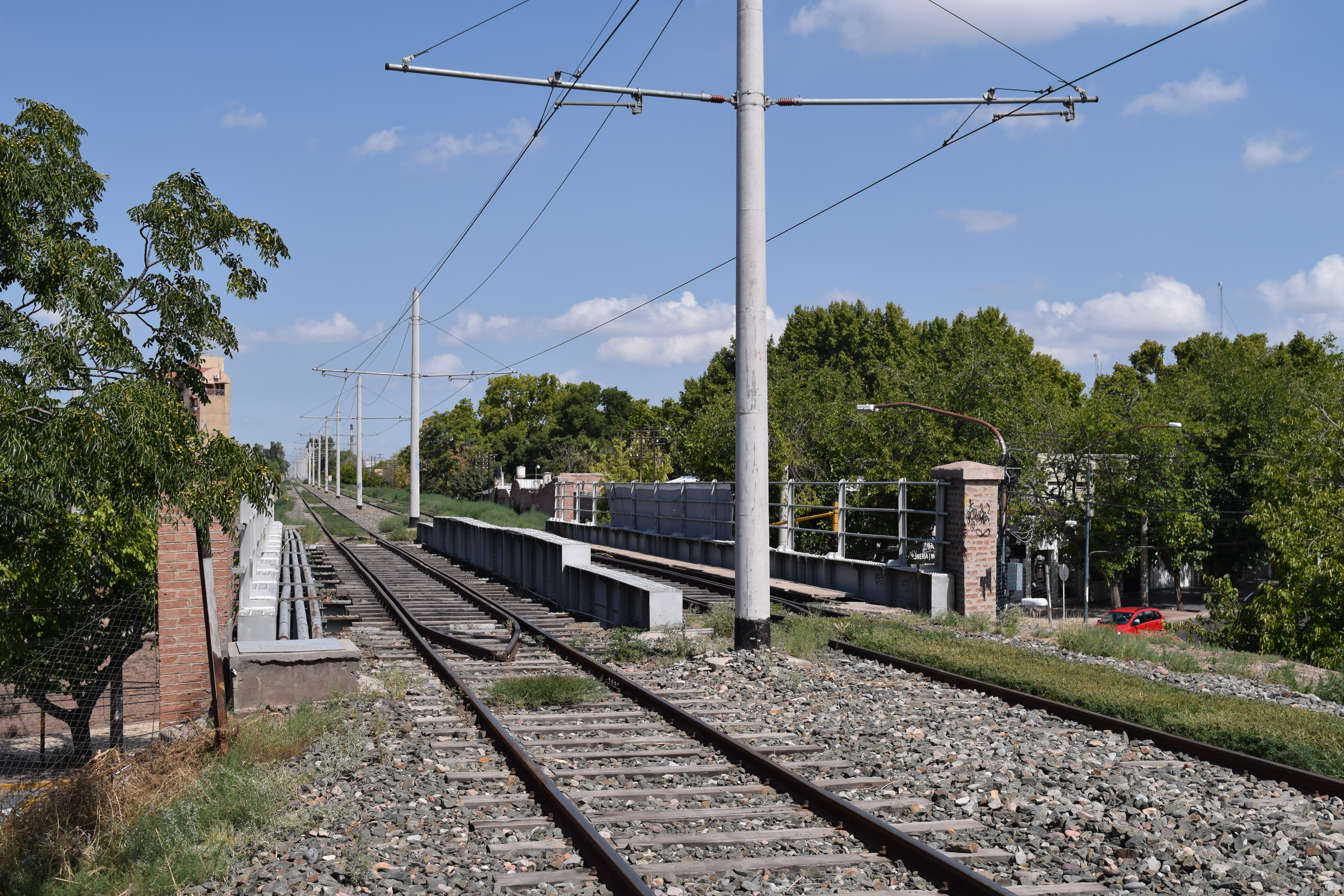

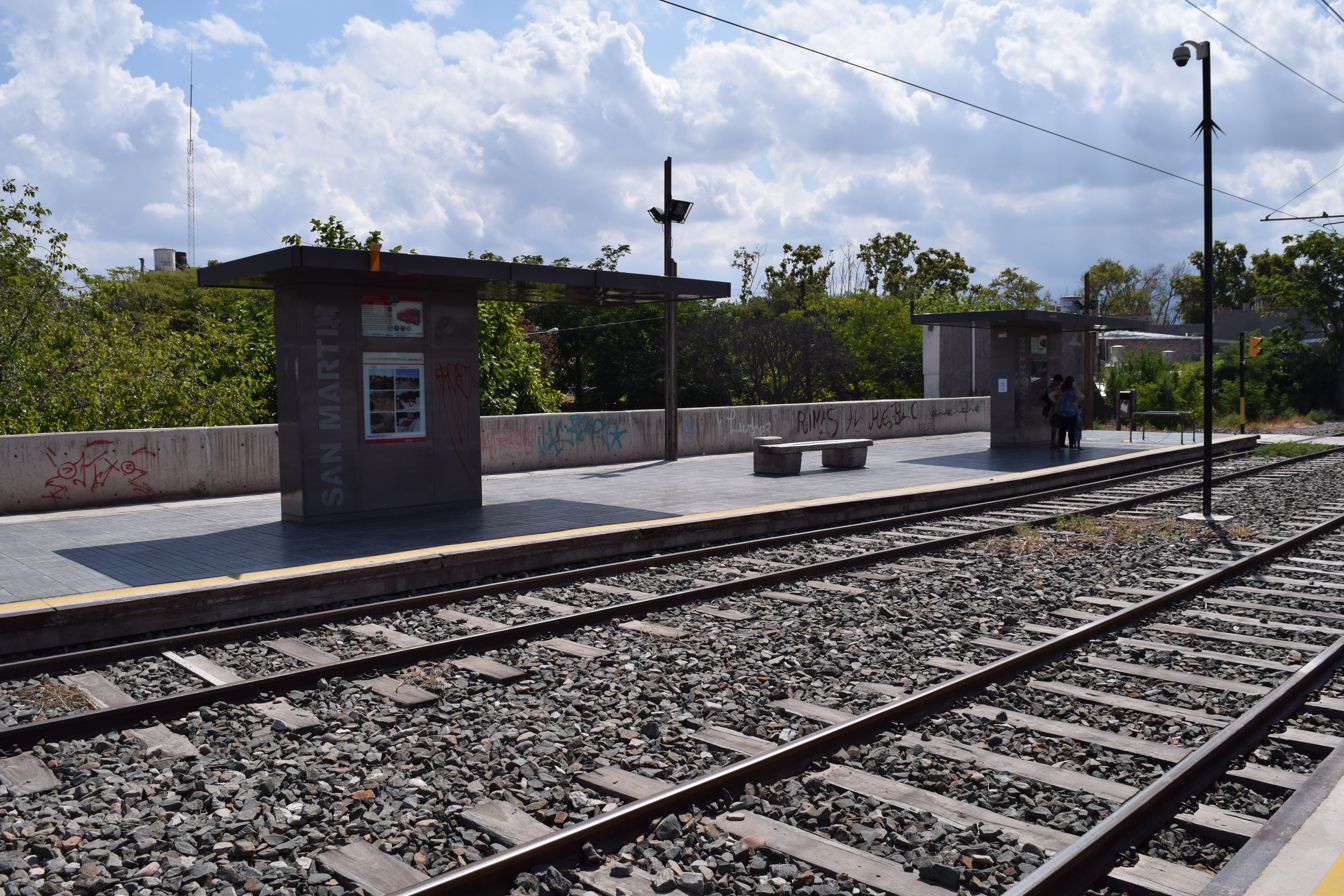

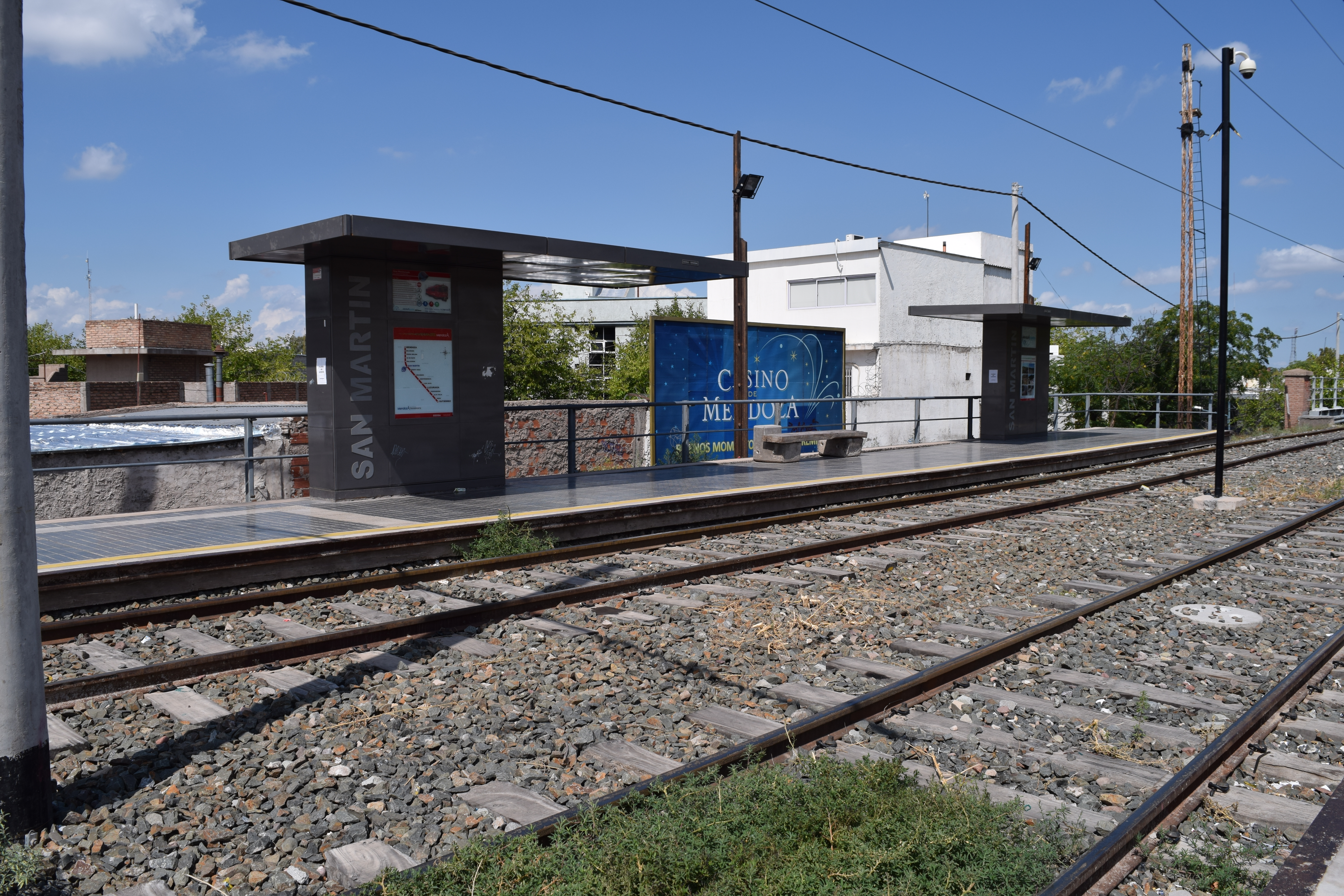

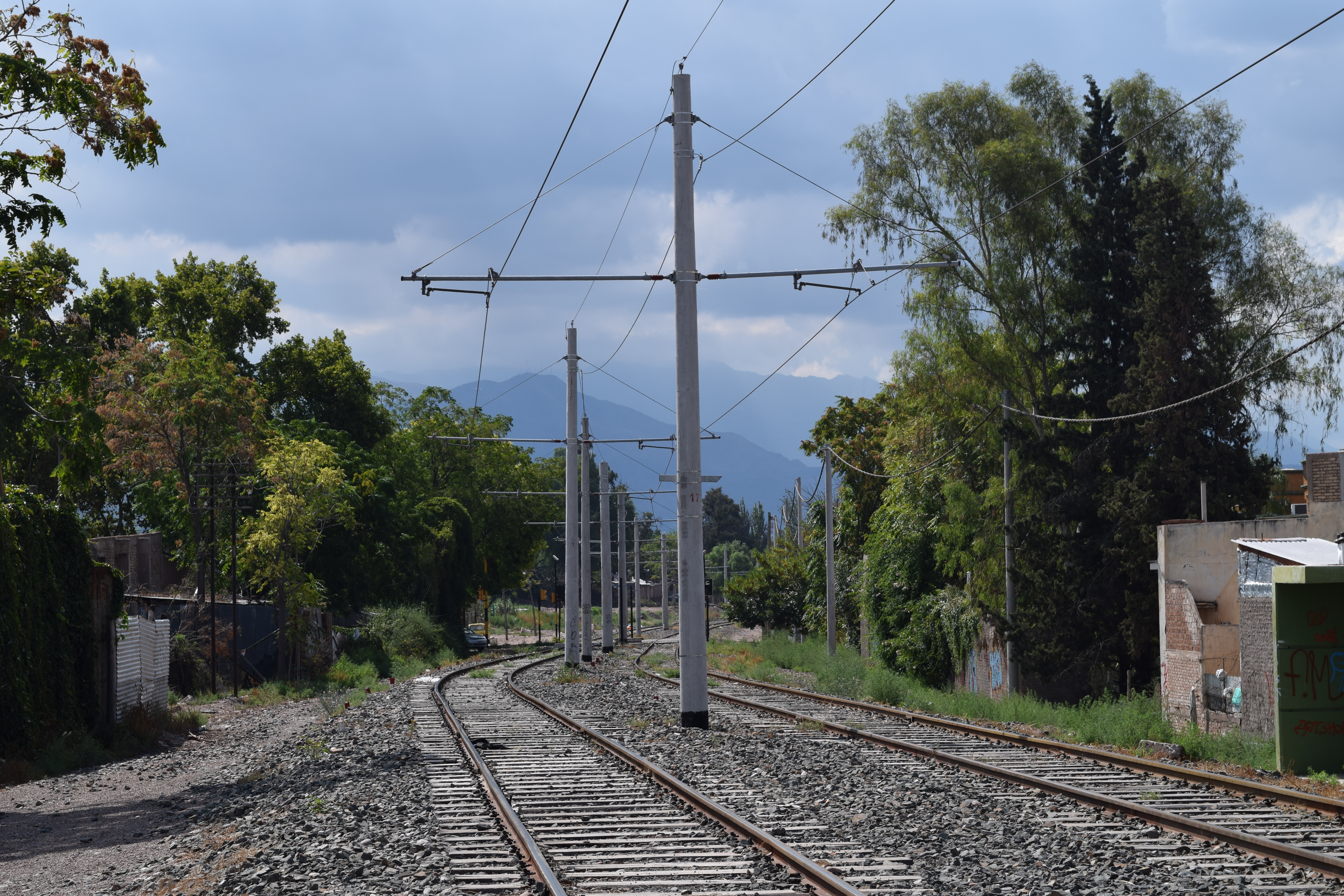
