= Pamela Verasay =

Argentine politician

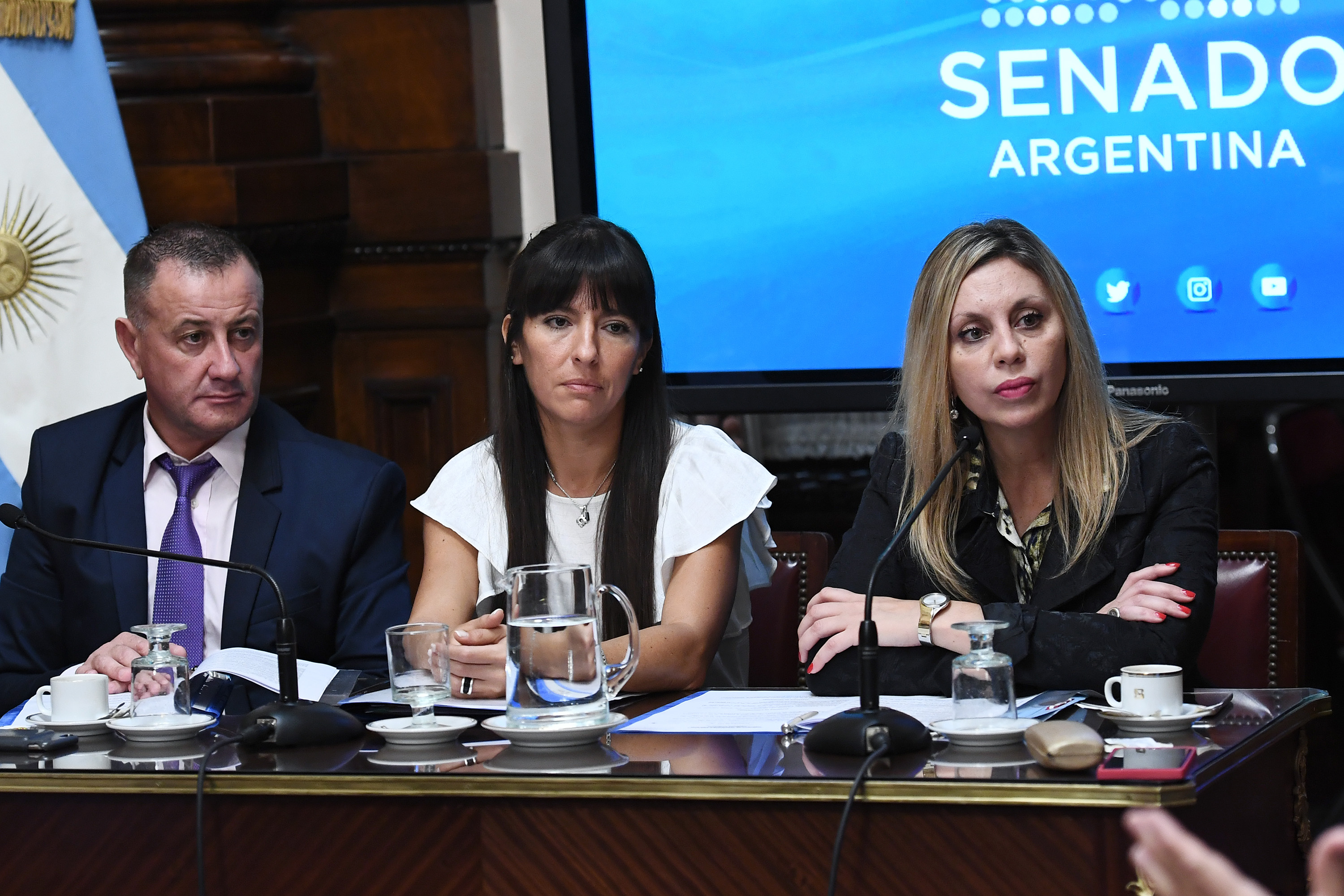

National Deputy
- Incumbent
- Assumed office 10 December 2021
- Constituency: Mendoza

National Senator
- In office 10 December 2015 – 10 December 2021
- Constituency: Mendoza

Provincial Deputy of Mendoza
- In office 1 May 2014 – 10 December 2015
- Constituency: Capital

Personal details
- Born: 26 April 1980 (age 46) Mendoza, Argentina
- Party: Radical Civic Union
- Other political affiliations: Juntos por el Cambio (since 2015)
- Education: National University of Cuyo

Pamela Fernanda Verasay (born 26 April 1980) is an Argentine politician, currently serving as a National Deputy elected in Mendoza Province since 2021. She previously served as a National Senator for Mendoza from 2015 to 2021 as well. Verasay belongs to the Radical Civic Union (UCR).

== Early life and education ==
Verasay was born on 26 April 1980 in Mendoza, Argentina. She finished high school at Escuela de Comercio Martín Zapata, and later studied public accounting at the National University of Cuyo, graduating in 2014.

== Political career ==
Verasay became politically active in the Franja Morada, the Radical Civic Union's student wing. In 2013, Verasay was elected to the Provincial Chamber of Deputies of Mendoza in the Capital Department as part of the Radical Civic Union list; she took office on 1 May 2014.

Verasay was the second candidate in the Cambiemos list to the National Senate in Mendoza for the 2015 legislative election, behind Julio Cobos. With 42.87% of the vote, Cambiemos was the most alliance in the province, and so both Cobos and Verasay were elected for the majority seats and were sworn in as National Senators on 10 December 2015. She formed part of the UCR bloc in the Senate.

As senator, Verasay formed part of the parliamentary commissions on Accords, Women's Affairs, National Economy and Investment, Regional Economies, Education and Culture, General Legislation, and Mining, Energy and Fuels. She was a supporter of the legalisation of abortion in Argentina, voting in favour of the Voluntary Interruption of Pregnancy bills debated by the Argentine Congress in 2018 and 2020.

Before the end of her term as senator, in 2021, she was elected to the National Chamber of Deputies as part of the Cambia Mendoza list, she was once again the second candidate in the list, behind Cobos. Cambia Mendoza received 49.58% of the votes. She was sworn in on 7 December 2021.
