= Mendoza railway station =

Railway station in Mendoza, Argentina

Mendoza
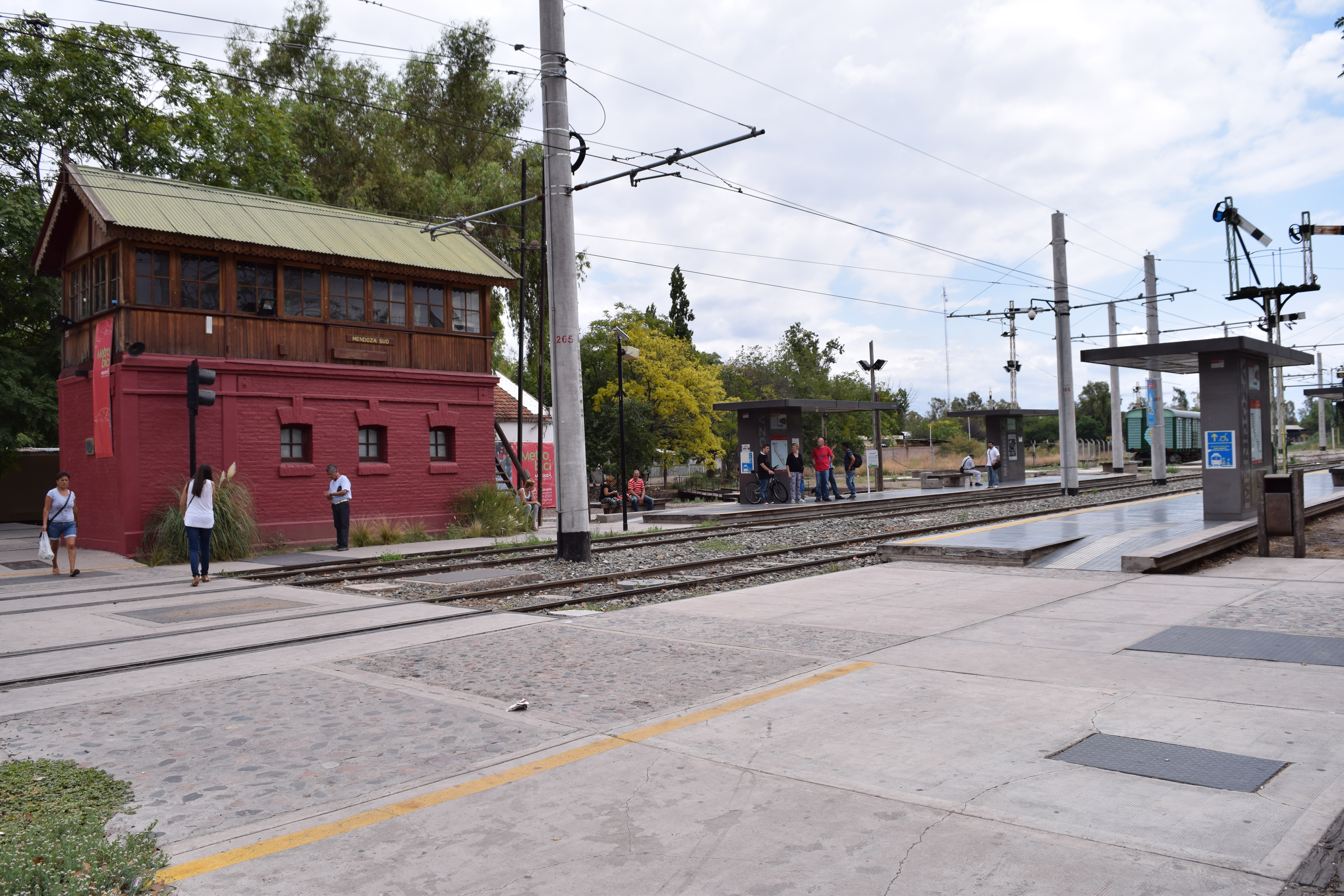
- Mendoza station as a tram stop in 2015. The old semaphore signals are visible at background

General information
- Location: Av. Belgrano and Av. Las Heras, Mendoza; Argentina
- Coordinates: 32.8841°S 68.8485°W
- System: Light rail
- Owner: Government of Argentina
- Operator: Metrotranvía Mendoza (passenger); Trenes Argentinos Cargas (freight)
- Platforms: 2
- Tracks: 2

History
- Opened: 1885; 141 years ago
- Closed: 1993 (reopened in 2012)
- Electrified: Yes (2012)

Services
Preceding station	STM	Following station
Belgrano towards General Gutiérrez	Metrotranvía Mendoza	Avellaneda Major stops Terminus
Location

Mendoza Station is a railway station located in the city of the same name in Argentina. It was inaugurated in 1885 and originally operated by state-owned Andean Railway (then taken over by British companies such as Buenos Aires and Pacific Railway). Nowadays Mendoza is currently used by Metrotranvía Mendoza, a light rail transport system inaugurated in 2012. The station is also served by state-owned company Trenes Argentinos Cargas which runs freight trains in the region.

The station operated between 1885 and 1993 when it was closed by the national government. It remained disused and abandoned until 2012 when the Metrotranvía was inaugurated. The administrative building was reopened as a cultural centre named "Estación Cultural", while the main station building was completely remodelled when Metrotranvía extended to Las Heras in 2019.

== History ==
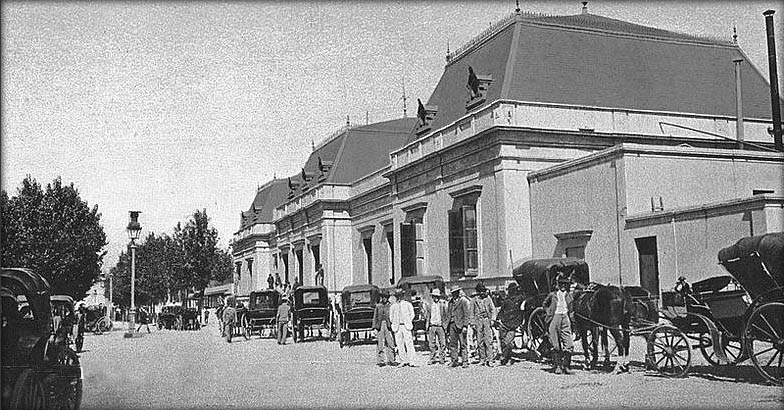
Mendoza station in 1890

The station was opened in 1885 by state-owned Ferrocarril Andino, then taken over by British operator Buenos Aires and Pacific Railway, which managed all railway services in Argentine central west. Mendoza was one of the stations that connected the Cuyo region with the city of Buenos Aires until 1993 when the administration led by Carlos Menem closed all the long-distance passenger train services.

Several services ran between Buenos Aires and San Juan (with stop in Mendoza), some of them were "El Zonda", "El Sanjuanino", and an express and faster one ("El Libertador", which took 12h 45').

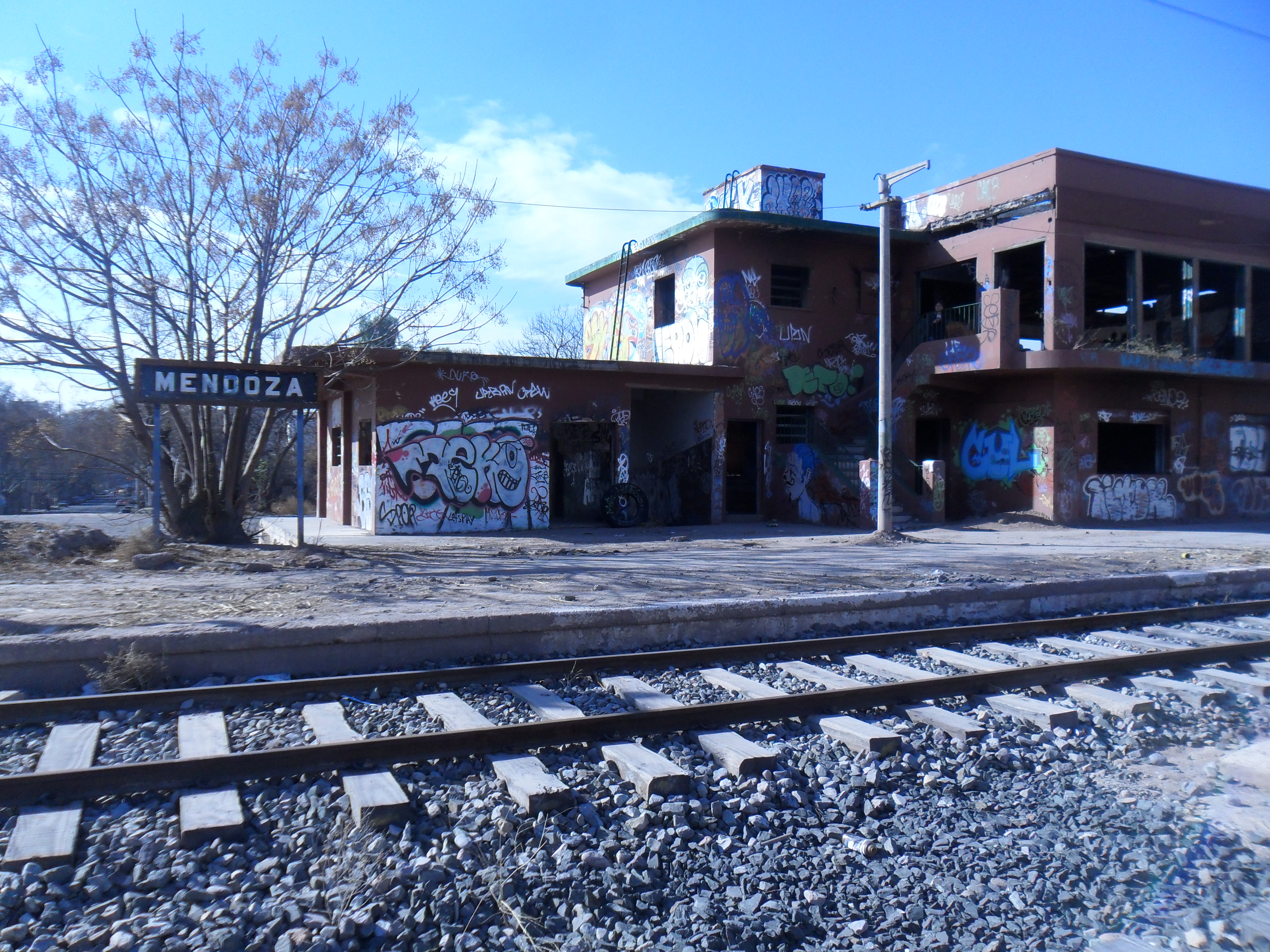
Mendoza station's deterioration as seen in 2013

After the services to Mendoza and other provinces in Cuyo region were cancelled in 1993, Mendoza station remained abandoned. Since its closure, Mendoza steadily deteriorated with some of its structures being stolen or vandalised. In 2012, the Government of Mendoza opened the "Metrotranvía Mendoza", a light rail system that ran on former San Martín Railway tracks. The Mendoza station was partially refurbished to operate the service, but works did not include the main building, which remained abandoned and vandalised.

When the provincial government started works to extend the Metrotranvía line to the city of Panquehua in Las Heras Department at a cost of AR$224 million in 2014, the original building of Mendoza station was completely refurbished. Although works were intended to be completed in 2016, the station was not finished until 2019, when the Mendoza – Panquehua section was inaugurated.

The administrative building located at the corner of Av. Perú and Av. Las Heras was reopened as a cultural center, administered by the Municipality of Mendoza.

== Current and historic passenger operators ==
Company	Period
(Argentina) Ferrocarril Andino	1885–1887
(United Kingdom) Argentine Great Western Railway	1887–1907
(United Kingdom) Buenos Aires and Pacific Railway	1907–1948
(Argentina) Ferrocarriles Argentinos	1948–1993
(Argentina) Sociedad de Transporte de Mendoza (Note: Operator of Metrotranvía Mendoza which serves the line.)	2012–present

== Gallery ==
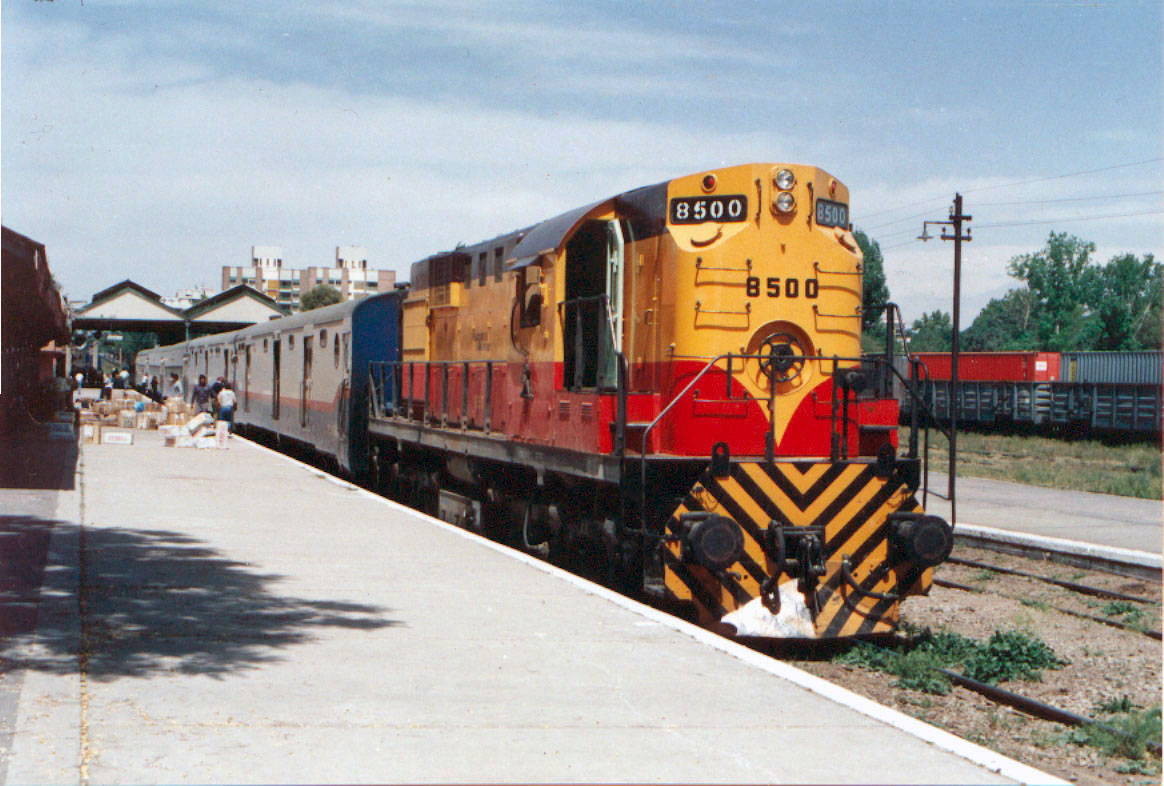
El Aconcagua at Mendoza, c. 1990

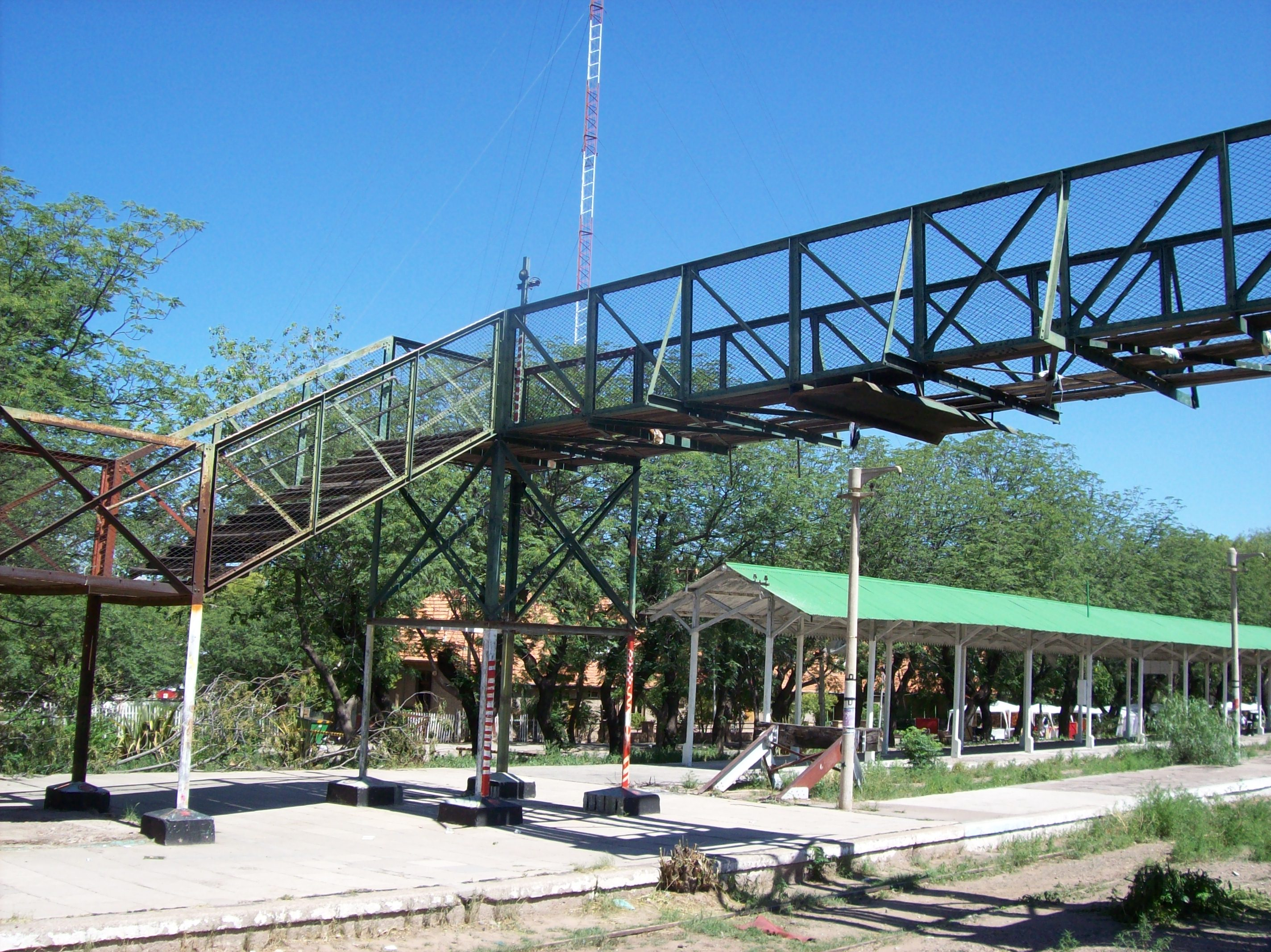
Platform and bridge, 2008

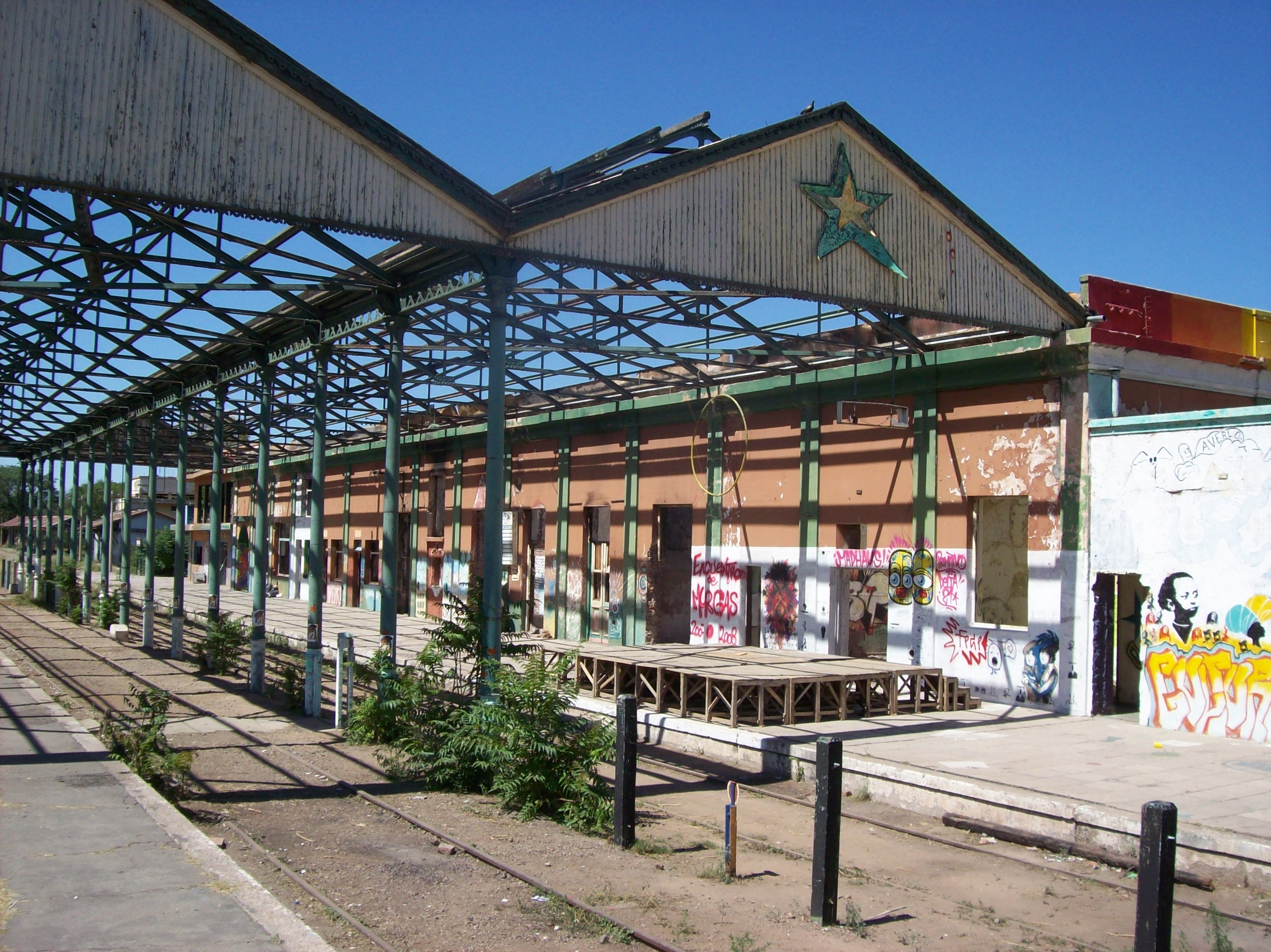
Deteriorated platform and building

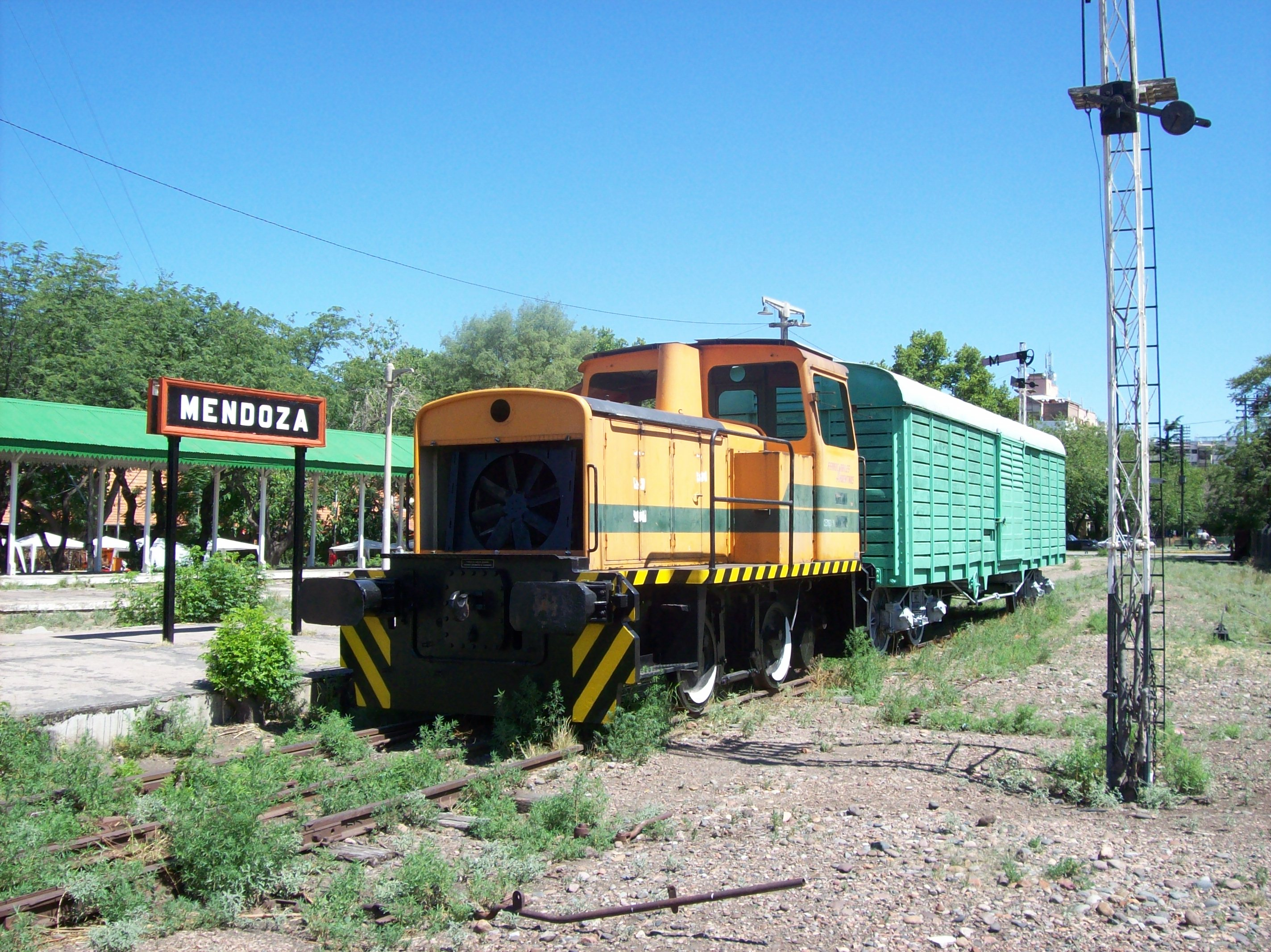
Train at the station 2008

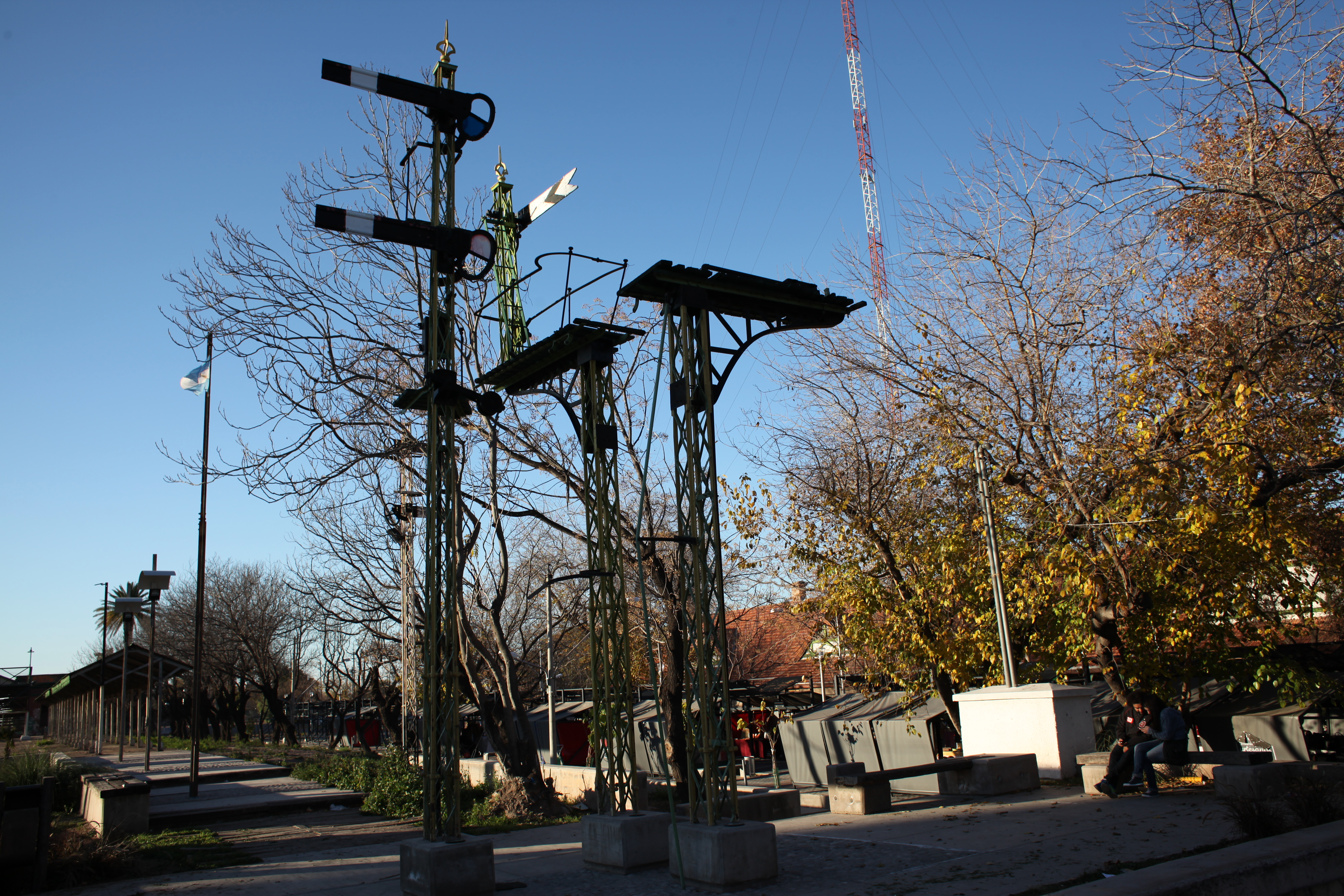
Signals in 2014

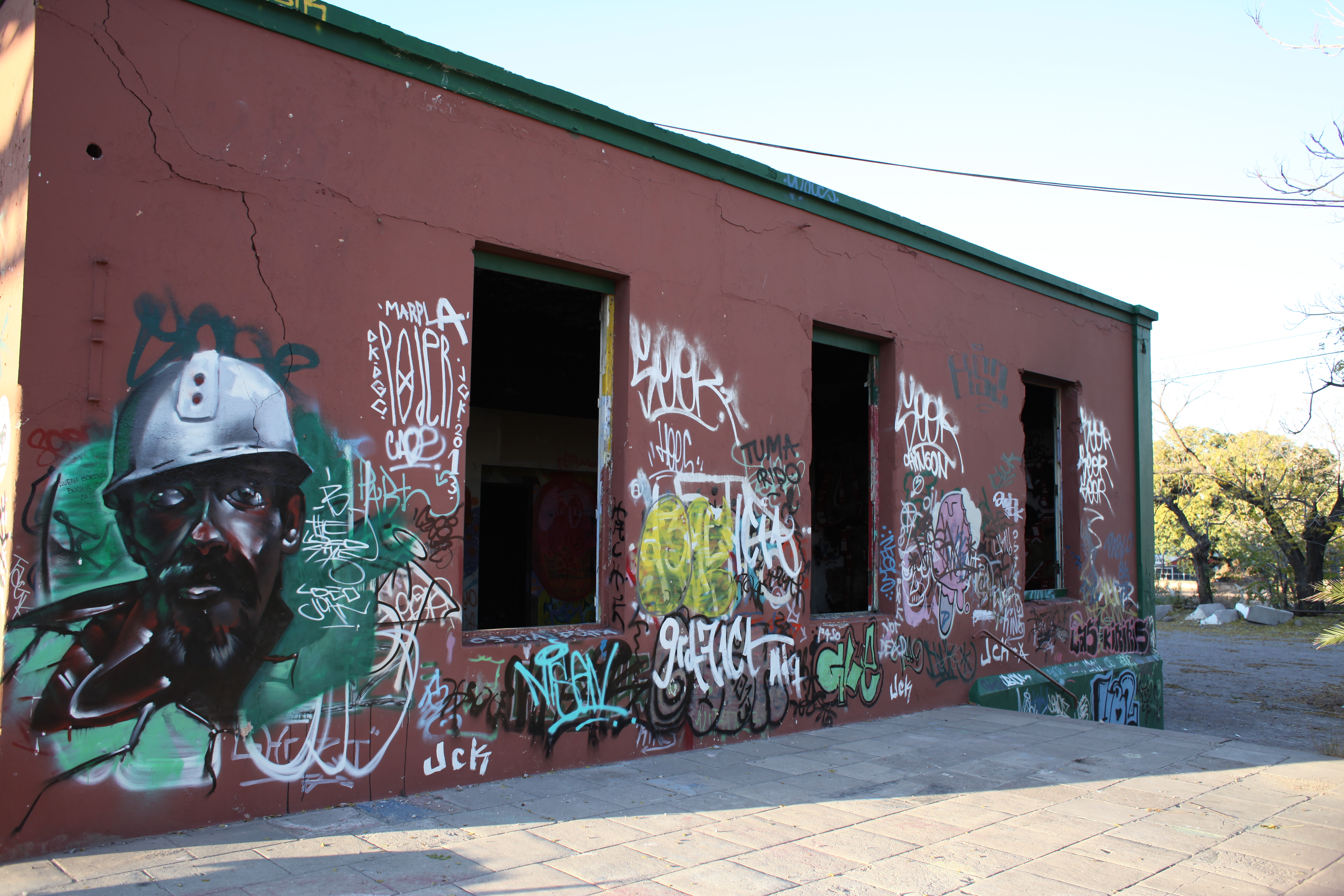
Main building before restoration

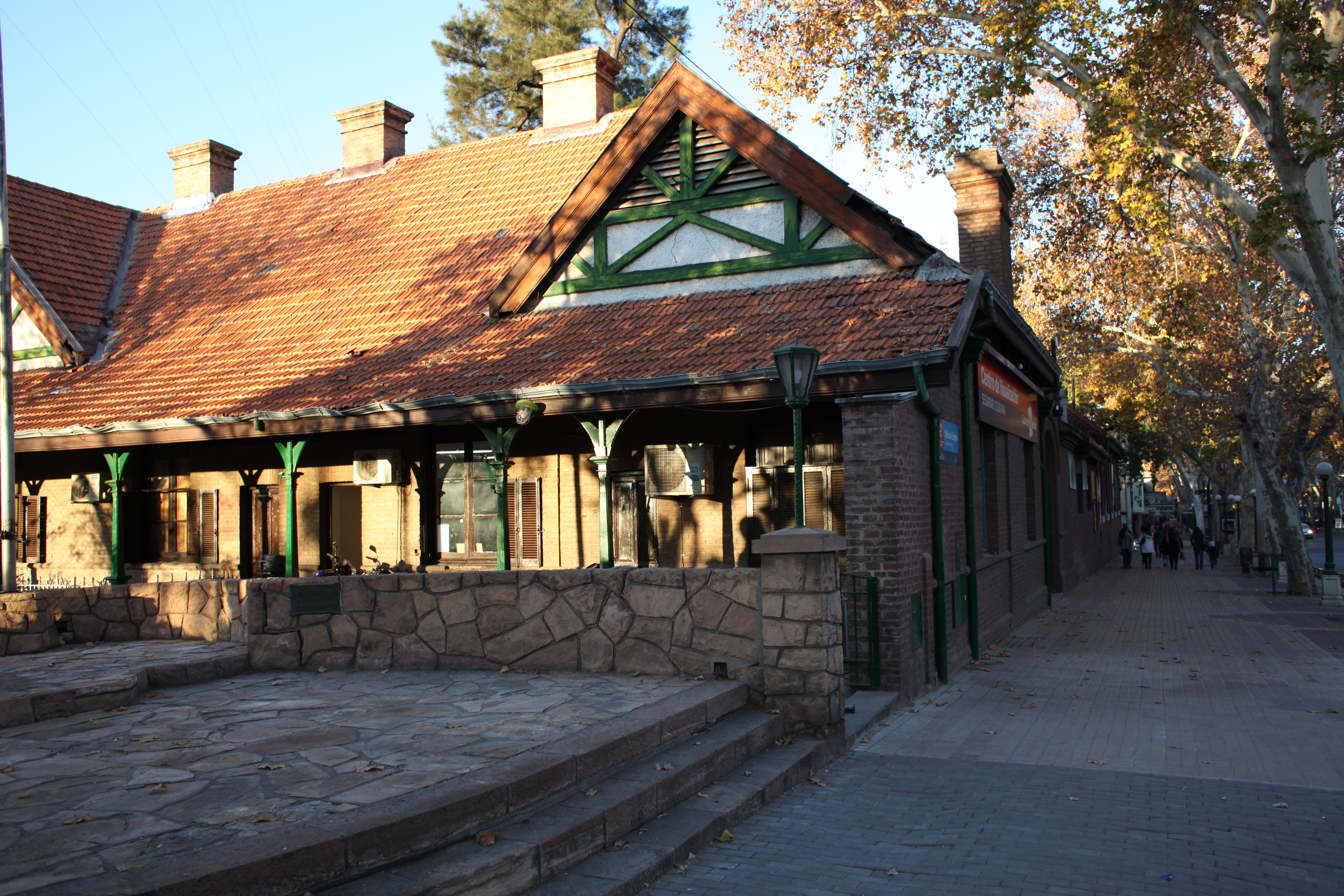
View of the offices

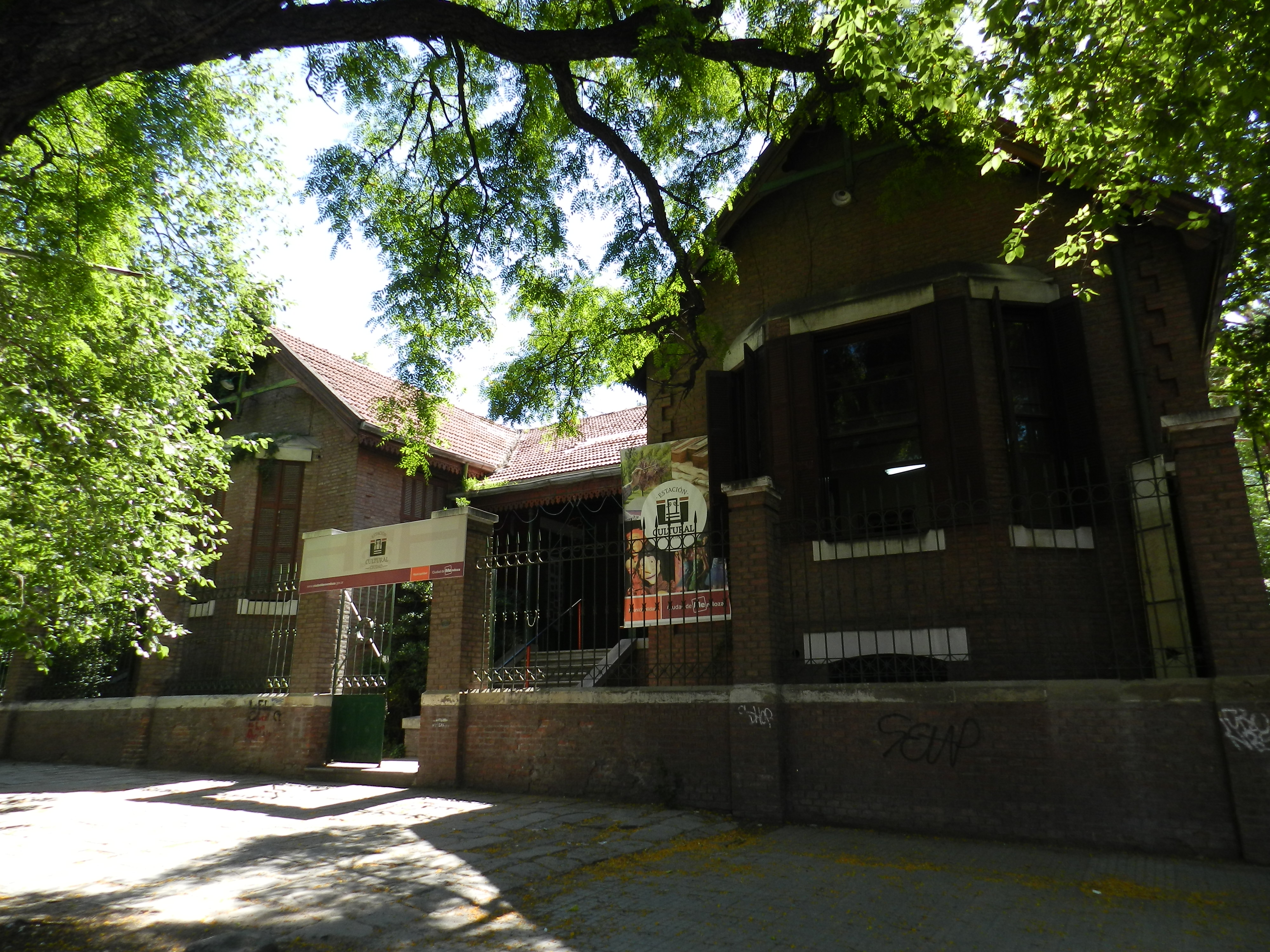
Cultural Center, 2015
