= Capital Department, Mendoza =

Capital Departamento Capital
- Department
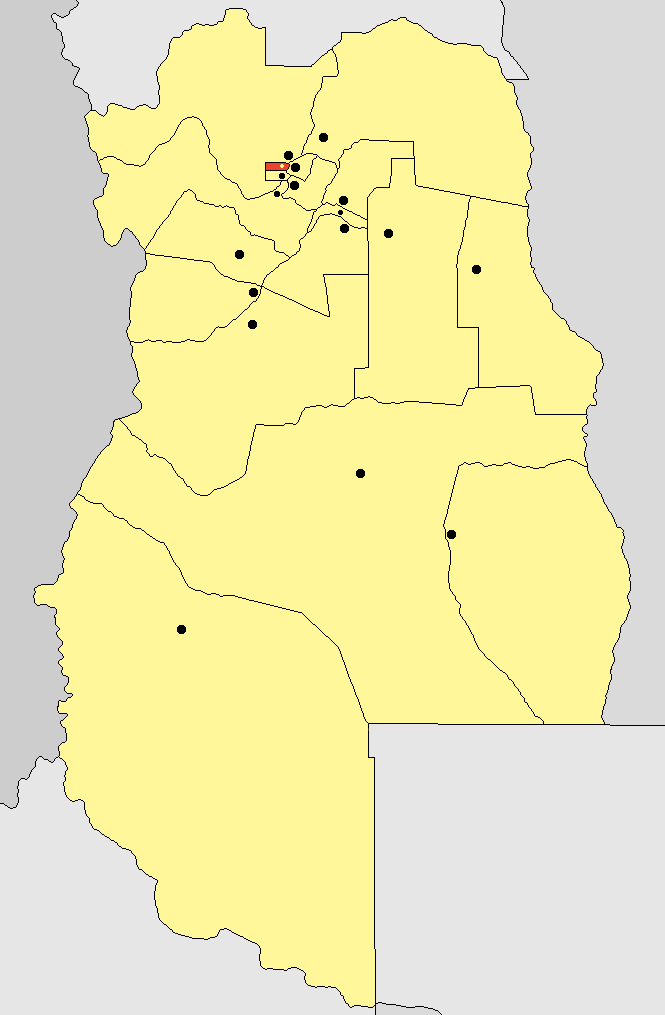
- location of in Mendoza Province
- Coordinates: 32°53′S 68°50′W
- Country: Argentina
- Established: December 20, 1869
- Founder: ?
- Seat: Mendoza

Government
  - Intendant: Ulpiano Suárez, UCR

Area
  - Total: 54 km^{2} (21 sq mi)

Population (2022)
  - Total: 127,160
  - Density: 2,400/km^{2} (6,100/sq mi)
- Demonym: mendocino/a
- Postal Code: M5500
- IFAM: MZA011
- Area Code: 0261
- Patron saint: Saint James the Great
- Website: www.ciudaddemendoza.gov.ar

Capital is a department of Mendoza Province in Argentina. The provincial subdivision has a population of about 111,000 inhabitants in an area of 54 km^{2} (21 sq mi), and its head city is Mendoza, which also serves as the provincial capital.

== Sports ==
Mendoza is home to several football clubs, the most notable of these is Gimnasia y Esgrima who play in the regionalised 3rd Division. The most notable football team of the moment is Club Atletico Godoy Cruz Antonio Tomba, which participates in the first division of Argentinian Football. Club Sportivo Independiente Rivadavia is also a very well known football team, it's disputing the Nacional B tournament which is second division in Argentina.

== Education ==
The main campus of the National University of Cuyo is based in Mendoza City. UTN (Universidad Tecnologica Nacional) is also situated in Mendoza City.

== Districts ==
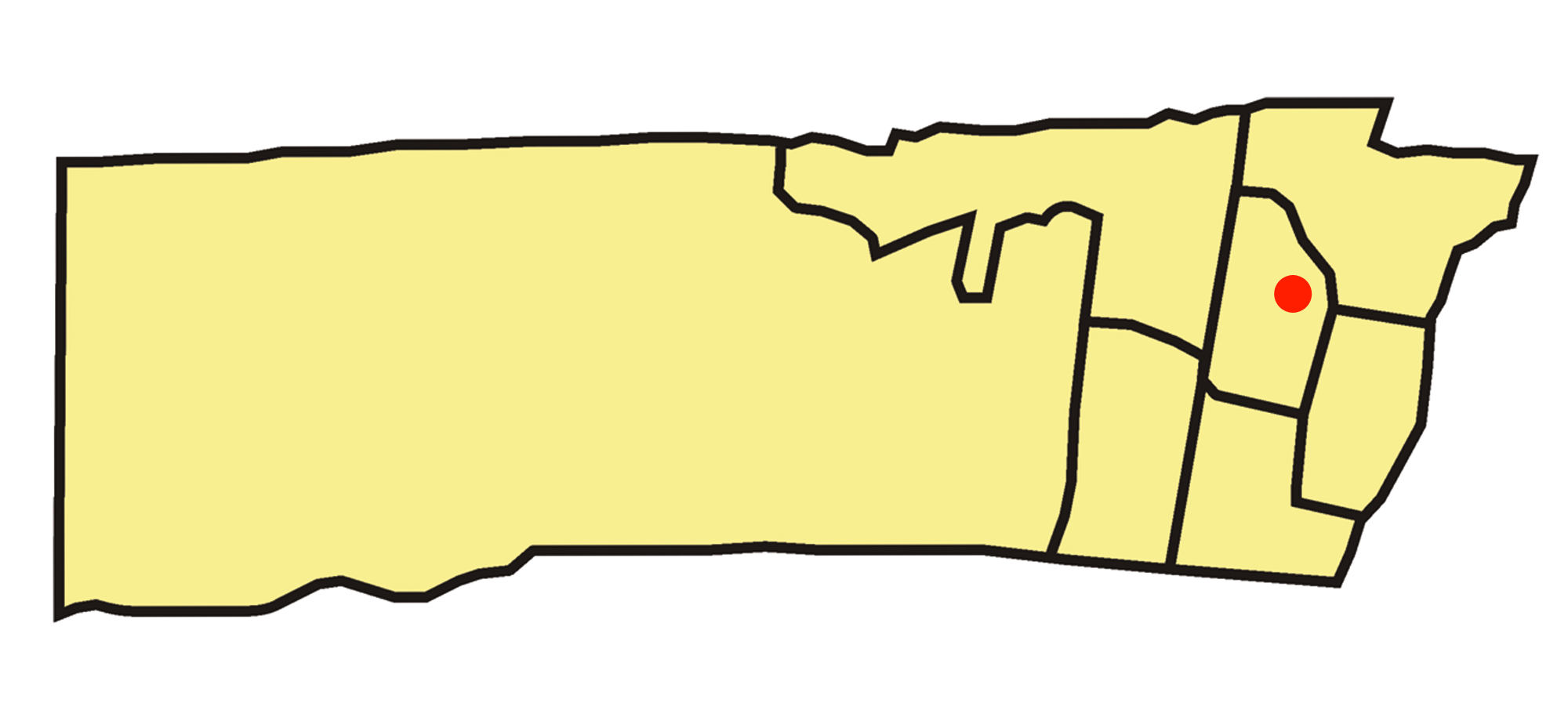
Capital Department and its seven districts. The Zona Oeste is occupied mainly by the General San Martín Park and several mountains

The Department was divided in seven districts:

Primera Sección

Segunda Sección

Tercera Sección

Cuarta Sección

Quinta Sección

Sexta Sección

Zona Oeste

But since January 2003 is divided in twelve districts, remaining the sections 1 to 5 their limits:

Primera Sección

Segunda Sección

Tercera Sección

Cuarta Sección

Quinta Sección

Sexta Sección

Séptima Sección

Octava Sección

Novena Sección

Décima Sección

Décimoprimera Sección

Décimosegunda Sección
