= Avellaneda station =

Metrotranvía Mendoza station

Avellaneda station Parador Avellaneda
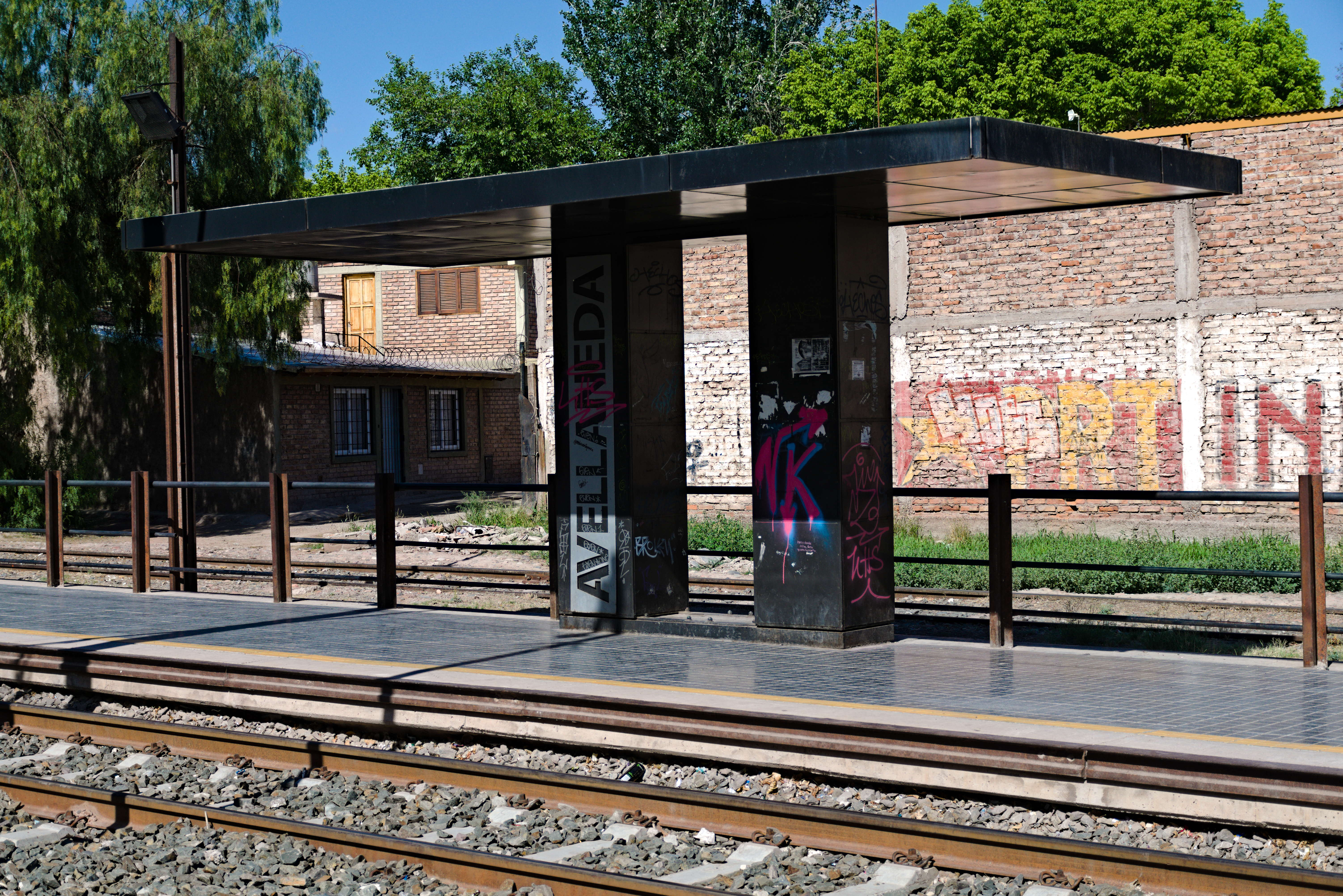

General information
- Location: Las Heras; Argentina
- Coordinates: 32.839747°S 68.836843°W
- Transit authority: Sociedad de Transporte Mendoza
- Platforms: 2 side platforms
- Tracks: 2

History
- Opened: 7 May 2019

Services
Preceding station	STM	Following station
Mendoza Major stops towards General Gutiérrez	Metrotranvía Mendoza	Terminus
Future services
Preceding station	STM	Following station
Mendoza Major stops towards General Gutiérrez	Metrotranvía Mendoza (Opening 2025)	Espejo towards Aeropuerto Internacional El Plumelillo
Mendoza Major stops towards Luján de Cuyo	Metrotranvía Mendoza; Luján de Cuyo branch (Opening 2027)	Espejo towards Aeropuerto Internacional El Plumelillo

Avellaneda is a Metrotranvía Mendoza station in Las Heras, in the Department of Las Heras, Mendoza Province, Argentina. It opened on 7 May 2019, as part of a 9-station, 5.5 km (3.4 mi)-long extension from Mendoza.

== Images ==
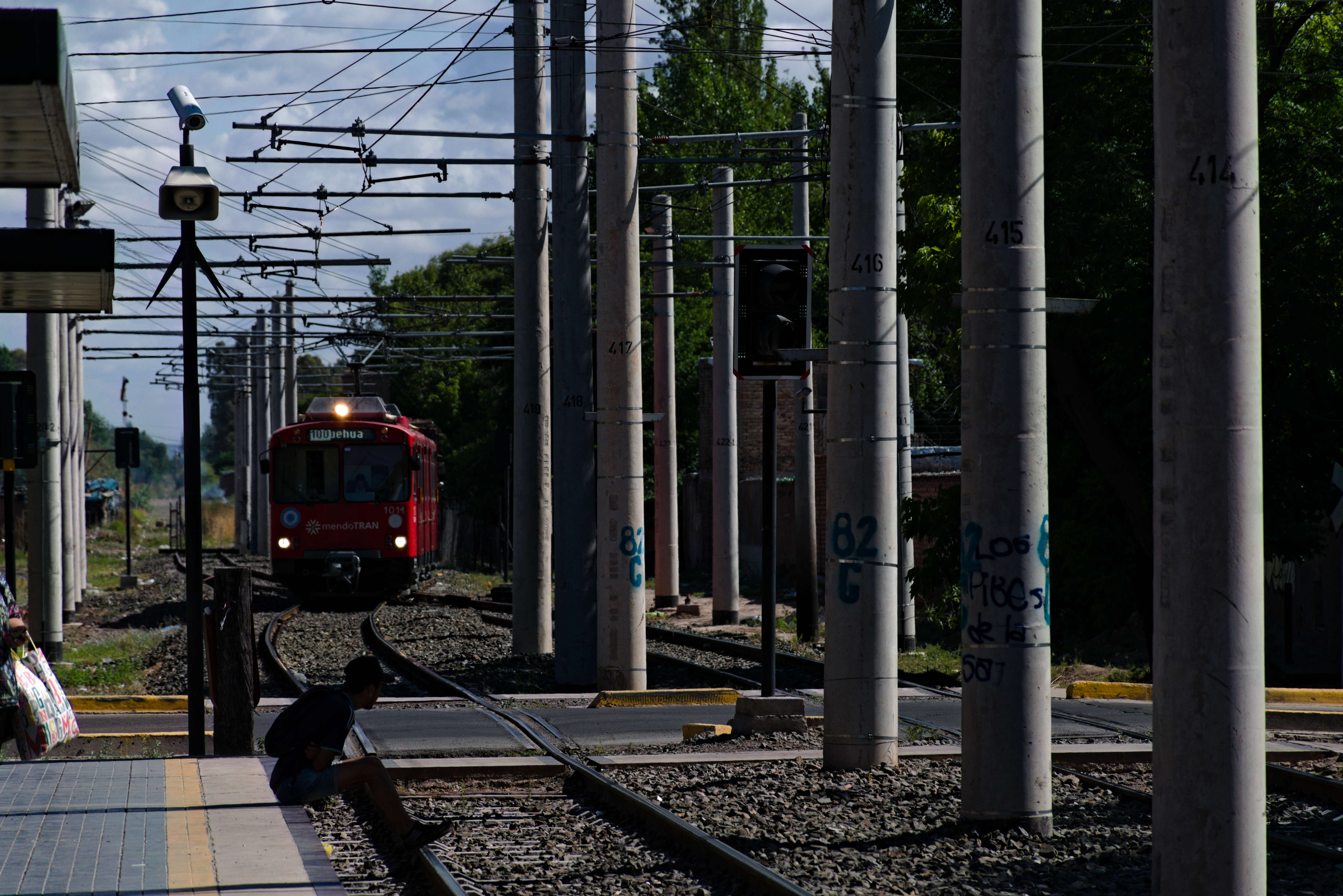
A train at the station

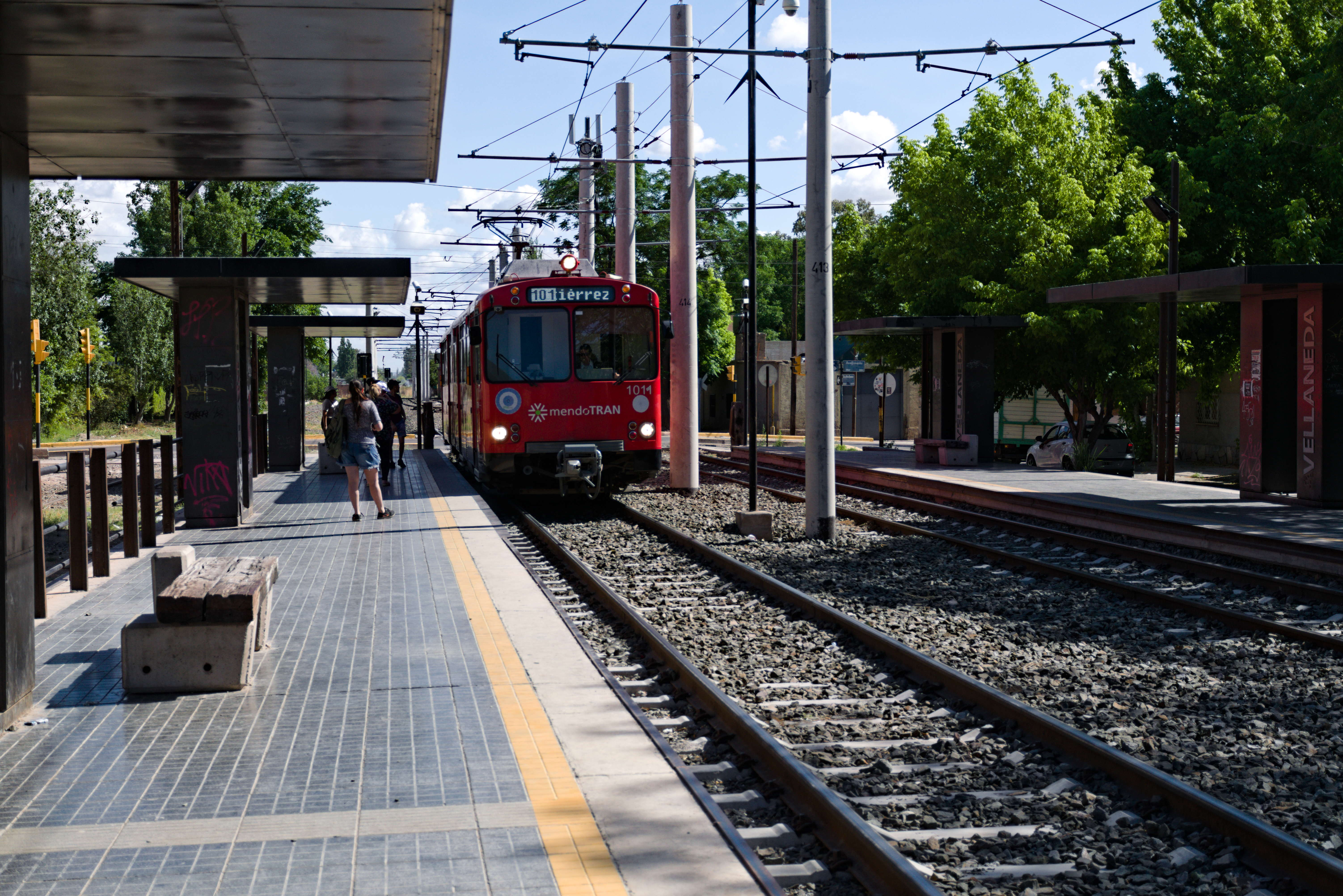
A train at the station

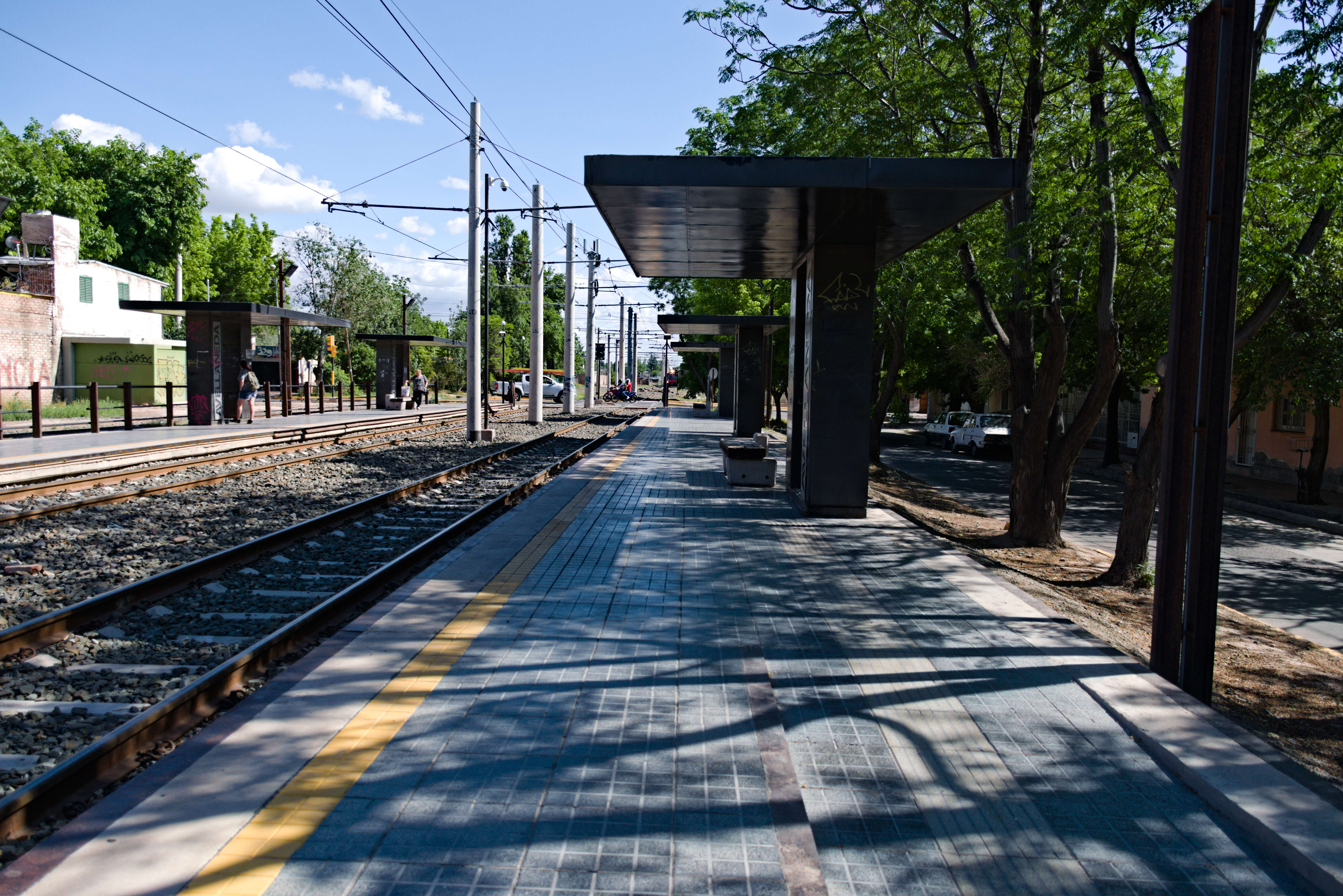
Platform

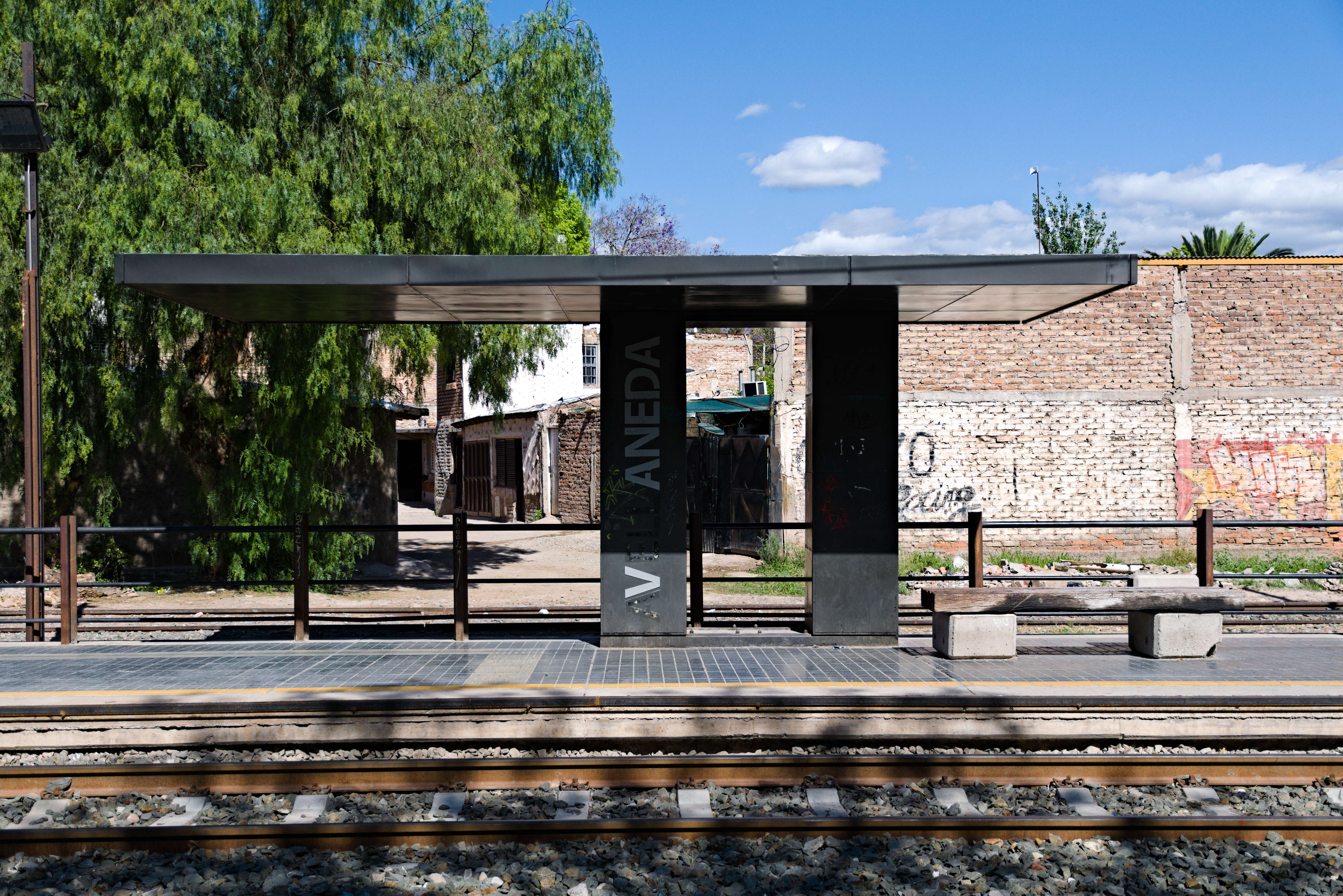
Shelter at the platform

== See also ==
- Las Heras
- Sociedad de Transporte Mendoza
- Metrotranvía Mendoza
