= Arturo (polar bear) =

Polar bear in an Argentinian zoo

- Species: Ursus maritimus
- Sex: Male
- Born: 23 November 1985; Buffalo, New York, US
- Died: 3 July 2016 (age 30); Mendoza, Argentina
- Owner: Mendoza Zoological Park

Arturo (1985 – July 3, 2016) was a polar bear living in Mendoza Zoological Park in Mendoza, Argentina. He was born in the United States and transferred to Argentina in 1993. In 2012, he became the country's only polar bear following the deaths of his cagemate and another bear. The living conditions of the cage Arturo resided in were controversial, as temperatures reach up to 40 °C (104 °F) in Argentina, and the pool in Arturo's cage was only 51 centimetres (20 in) deep. Animal rights activists had, in response, dubbed Arturo the "world's saddest animal" and promoted a petition to have him moved to Assiniboine Park Zoo in Winnipeg. The petition gained considerable attention from animal rights activists, celebrities, and politicians, andthe hashtag #Freearturo began trending on Twitter. Supporters dubbed him "the world's saddest polar bear."

Ultimately, the relocation plan never materialized, despite the Assiniboine Park Zoo's willingness to accept Arturo. The Mendoza Zoo refused to transfer Arturo, fearing that he was too old to survive the move, and that they did not have the necessary medical records to allow the transfer. Arturo died two years after the petition, at 30 or 31 years of age.

== Life ==
Arturo, birth name Arthur, was born in the Buffalo Zoo on 23 November 1985. He had a twin sister. At 10 months old, Arthur was sold to the Fresno Chaffee Zoo in California. At one point, his fur turned green from the heat.

Arturo was brought to Argentina's Mendoza Zoo at age 8. A female polar bear named Pelusa (Spanish for "fluffball") was imported from Germany in hopes of breeding with him, but while the pair mated five times, all of their cubs died shortly after birth. Pelusa died of cancer in 2012. After the death of Winner, a polar bear in Buenos Aries who died the same year in a heat wave, Arturo become the only polar bear in Argentina.

== Campaign to transfer Arturo ==
In 2014, concern for Arturo's wellbeing became widespread. Eyewitness claimed that Arturo displayed stereotypic behavior, such as rocking back and forth and pacing, behaviors that Pelusa also allegedly displayed before her death. Additionally, as the climate in Argentina can reach 30 °C (86 °F), the zoo was deemed an unsuitable environment for a cold-weather animal. The heat wave-caused death of Winner in 2012 was cited in support of this claim. The zoo denied that Arturo was depressed, claiming that his keepers provided companionship.

Supporters of Arturo's plight formed a plan to have him relocated to Winnipeg's Assiniboine Park Zoo. As of July 19, 2014, a petition to do so received over 400,000 signatures, and had been endorsed by Newt Gingrich and Cher. A Reddit fundraiser raised over $4,000 for the cause, a separate petition made by Greenpeace reached 160,000 signatures, and the hashtag #FreeArturo trended on social media.

Assiniboine Park Zoo responded that while they would have gladly accepted Arturo there, they did not have the authority to do so unless Argentina agreed to transfer him there. On July 24, 2014, the director of the Mendoza Zoo, Gustavo Pronotto, told the Associated Press that Arturo was too old to be moved to Canada. The trip to Manitoba would be 6,000 miles (9,700 km), for which the 28-year-old bear would have to be sedated. Additionally, the Mendoza Zoo lacked medical records for Arturo, which are required for imports by the Canadian Food Inspection Agency. A panel of veterinarians determined that Arturo should stay in Argentina for his safety.

== Death ==
Arturo died on July 3, 2016, aged 30, equivalent to age 60 in human years. Wild polar bears typically reach 15 to 18 years in age, although some wild individuals have lived to 30. At the time of his death, he was blind in one eye and had lost a "significant" amount of weight.

== See also ==
- Keiko (orca), a captive orca successfully freed after public pressure
- List of individual bears
