= Teatro Independencia =

Coordinates: 32°53′18.5″S 68°50′45″W

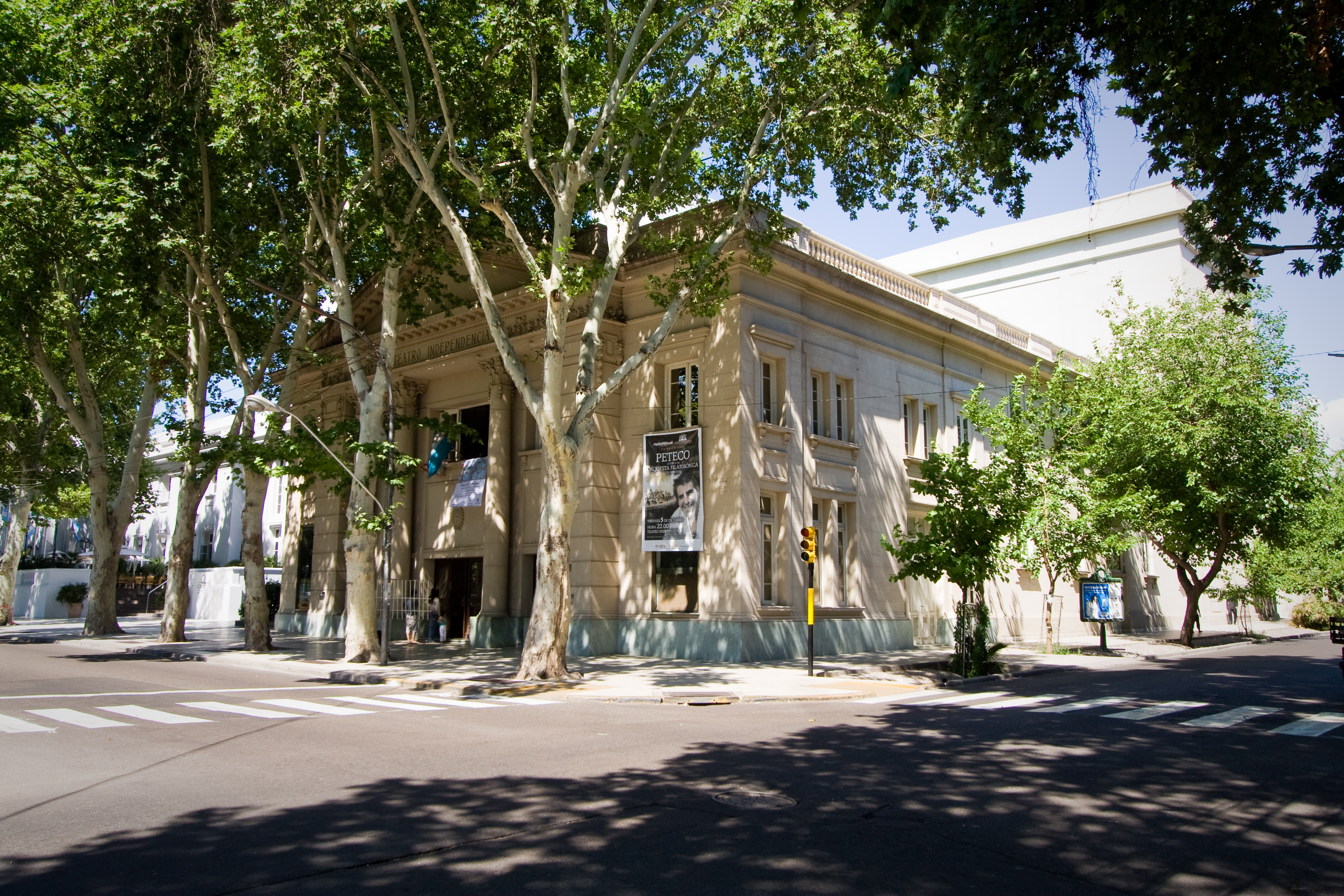
The Teatro Independencia

The Teatro Independencia ("Independence Theatre") is the premier performing arts venue in Mendoza, Argentina.

== History and overview ==
The theatre resulted from a provincial project for the creation of a hub for tourism along Independence Square, downtown. The initiative, enacted by the reformist Governor Carlos Washington Lencinas in 1922, led to the opening of the Plaza Hotel, in 1924, and subsequently to a contract for the construction of the first opera house in Mendoza Province. The contract was awarded to Faustino and Mauricio da Rosa, who at the time managed the renowned Teatro Colón of Buenos Aires by concession.

Supervised by the nation's Ministry of Public Works, the project was commissioned to architect Alfredo Israel, and its plans were approved in October 1923. The theatre was, as were many public works of this type in Argentina at the time, designed in a French Academy style. Its façade included a Neoclassical frontis featuring four Corinthian columns on a green marble base, a rococo frieze, the provincial escutcheon in bas-relief, and a balustrade above.

The design for the interiors was based on those prevailing in Italian opera houses, and the formal vestibule is overlooked by grand marble steps leading to the concert hall. The auditorium itself includes four tiers of balconies, and its seating capacity is 730. The theatre serves as the home of the Provincial Philharmonic Orchestra.

Following a pre-inaugural festival organized by the Ladies' Brigade of the right-wing Argentine Patriotic League, the Independenicia was inaugurated on November 18, 1925, with the premiere of La Emigrada (The Emigrée), an opera by Argentine librettist Vicente Martínez Cuitiño; the work was performed by the Compañía Argentina de Dramas y Comedias, and featured Camila Quiroga (one of the leading opera performers in Argentina, at the time).

Cinema installations were added to the theatre in 1944, and these were inaugurated with a showing of Casablanca. The building suffered from a massive fire in 1963, and reopened in 1965 with a performance by the Colón Theatre Ballet Company. Further renovations begun in 2000 included the construction of a 5-story annex, and on September 21, 2003, the theatre was re-inaugurated with a performance by Mendoza-born soprano Fabiana Bravo.
