= Mendoza Zoological Park =

- Interactive map of Mendoza Zoological Park
- 32°53′4.41″S 68°53′20.65″W
- Date opened: 1903; 123 years ago
- Location: Mendoza, Argentina
- Land area: 48 hectares (120 acres)
- No. of animals: 1,300
- No. of species: over 39
- Annual visitors: 200,000
- Website: mendoza.gov.ar/ecoparque

The Ecoparque of Mendoza (formerly, Mendoza Zoological Park) was a park and former zoo in Mendoza Province, Argentina. It is located on Mendoza, Argentina, on the northeast slope of Cerro de la Gloria. It is bounded by the streets of San Francisco de Asis, Av Libertador and the descent vehicle of the monument to the Army of the Andes, and is part of General San Martin Park. It covers 48 hectares (120 acres) and has about of 1,100 animals. The only entrance is on Avenida Liberator.

== History ==
The old zoo was established in 1903 as part of the project landscape architect Carlos Thays, who was also commissioned the design of the then West Park (now known as Parque General San Martin). Construction began the following year, during the government of Emilio Civit. The initial location of the project was to address the current school-home Eva Perón. There he built a building that would be used as a cage for lions. Ponds and roads were also built later.

The first animals arrived on May 18, 1903, donated by the city of Buenos Aires. The group included a zebu, 6 dogs, 6 guinea pigs, and many rabbits. New animals (also donated by the city of Buenos Aires) came in 1905 while construction work continued. This time, joined a lion, a bear, two monkeys, a chimpanzee, two parrots, and a blue jay.

In 1939 he commissioned architect Daniel Ramos Correa relocation of the zoo. He devised an ambitious project to place it on the northeast slope of Cerro de la Gloria. Taking inspiration from various zoos around the world, the architect designed semi open enclosures that simulate natural habitats and enough space for animals, without bars or cages, just with different levels and building stone walls of the curvature of the hill. This never became fully effective, as during the construction itself included certain dangerous animals cages.

The zoo was officially opened in 1941, covering 40 hectares (99 acres) and including 6.5 kilometres (4.0 mi) of paths and roads.

Mendoza Zoological Park received a great deal of attention from animal lovers, activists and ordinary people around the world when the zoo's only polar bear 'Arturo' – known as the world's saddest polar bear – dies in July 2016, despite many attempts to free and relocate the bear to Canada. The zoo declined. On November 3, 2016, the zoo lost a now famous court case regarding chimpanzee Cecilia. The zoo was condemned for confining the animal to an unsuitable cage. Judge María Alejandra Mauricio granted Cecilia the status of 'legal person'. Since this was the first time an animal was granted this status, it caught the attention of biologist, philosopher, politicians and judges worldwide. Cecilia was sent to a shelter for great apes. As of 2019, the zoo was closed.
