= Juan Manuel Ferrari =

- Born: 21 May 1874; Montevideo, Uruguay
- Died: 31 October 1919 (aged 45); Buenos Aires, Argentina
- Education: Juan Ferrari, (father, sculptor); Ettore Ferrari, Rome; Ercole Rosa, Real Instituto de Bellas Artes.
- Known for: Sculpture
- Notable work: Monumento a la Independencia Nacional – Florida, Uruguay; Cerro de la Gloria, Argentina

Juan Manuel Ferrari was an Uruguayan sculptor, born on Montevideo on 21 March 1874 and died in Buenos Aires on 31 October 1919.

He studied with his father, sculptor Juan Ferrari in Montevideo and in 1890 traveled to Italy to study under Ettore Ferrari in Rome with a scholarship from the government of Uruguay. Later, while still in Italy he studied under Ercole Rosa at the Royal Institute of Beaux Arts.

Ferrari returned to Uruguay in 1896 and opened his own studio. Later on he moved to Buenos Aires and in 1915 he relocated again to Rome.

== Works ==
Among his most visible projects he made the following public monuments:

- Monument to Juan Antonio Lavalleja, Minas (1902),.
- Monument to the Battle of Las Piedras, Las Piedras (1911),.
- Monument to General San Martín's Liberation Army, under commission to Mendoza Province in Argentina, Cerro de la Gloria, (1914).
