= Mendoza, Argentina =

City in Argentina

Mendoza
- City
- City of Mendoza; Ciudad de Mendoza (Spanish)
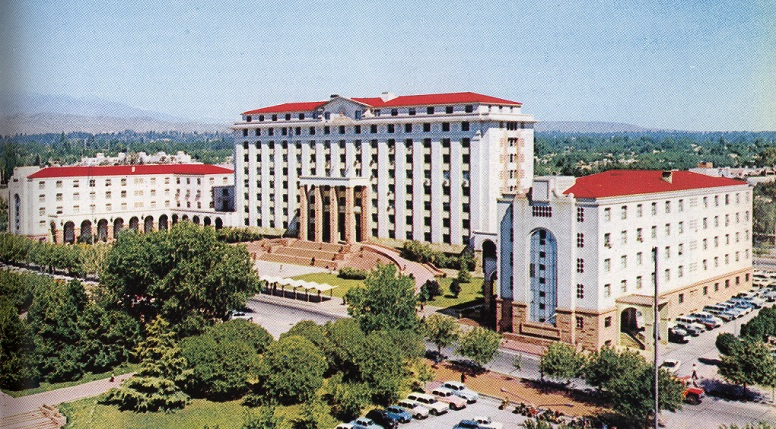
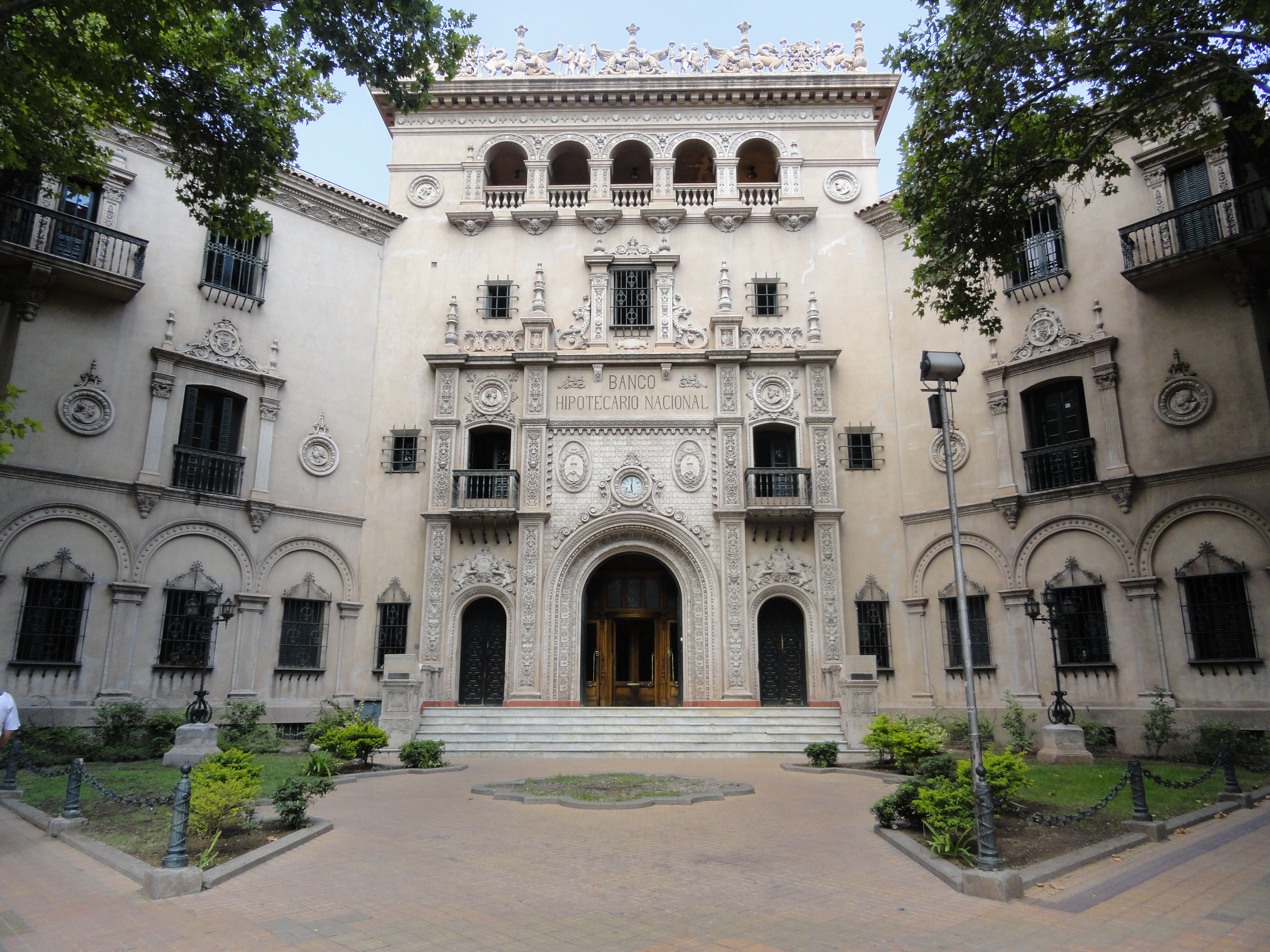
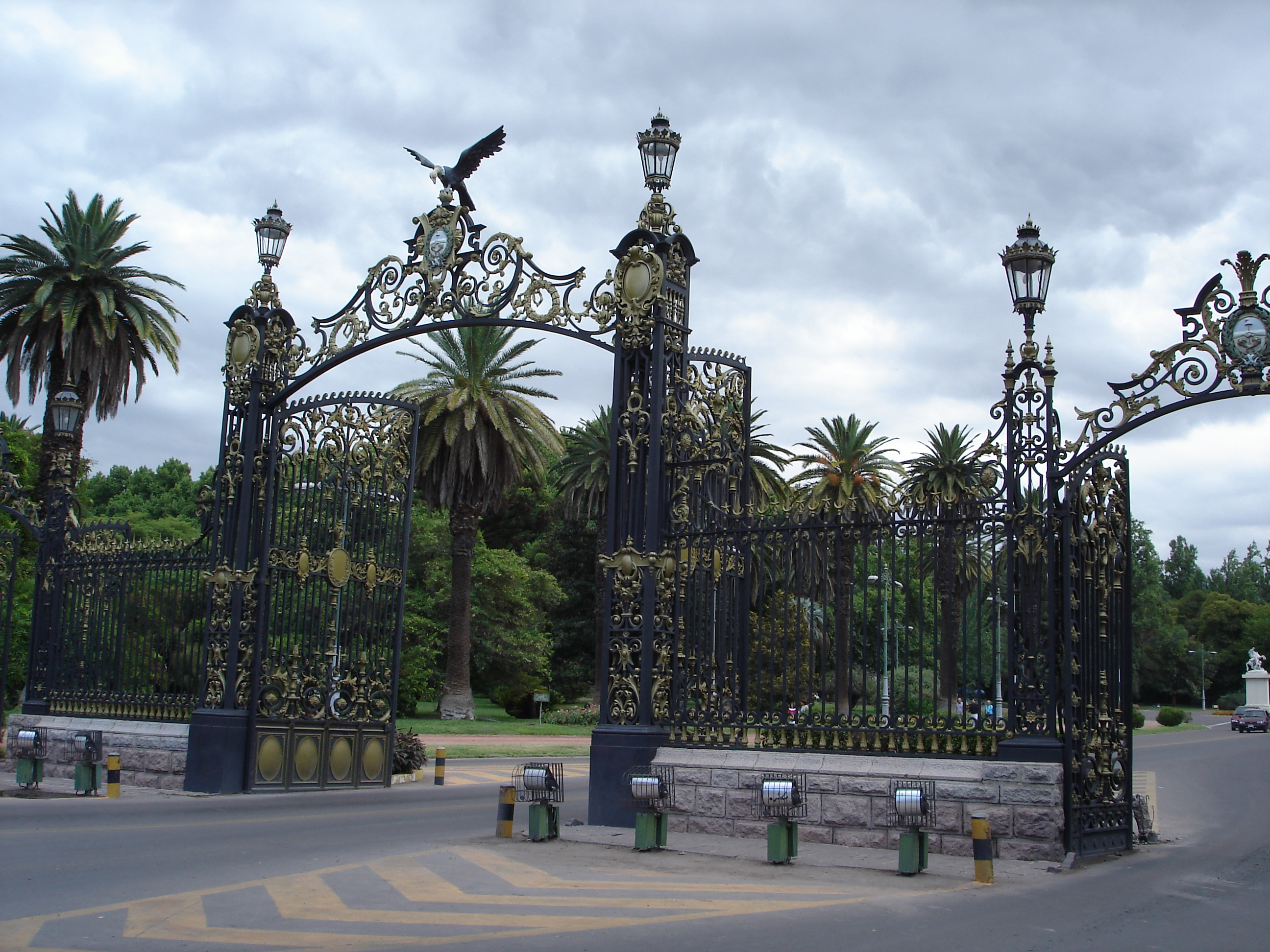
- Aerial view of central Mendoza Cerro de la Gloria Government House Former Banco Hipotecario General San Martín Park

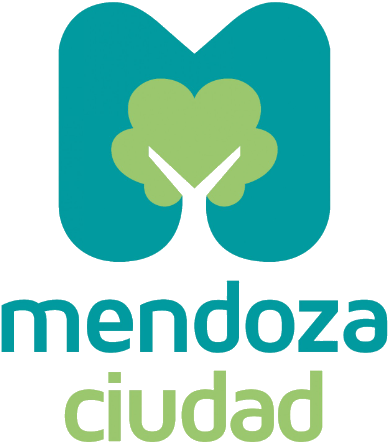
- Coat of arms Logo

- Location in Argentina Mendoza (South America)
- Coordinates: 32°53′23″S 68°50′40″W
- Country: Argentina
- Province: Mendoza
- Department: Capital
- Settled: 1561; 465 years ago
- Founder: Pedro del Castillo
- Named for: García Hurtado de Mendoza, 5th Marquis of Cañete

Government
  - Intendant: Ulpiano Suárez (UCR)

Area
  - City: 54 km^{2} (21 sq mi)
- Elevation: 746.5 m (2,449 ft)

Population (2010 census)
  - Density: 2,055.4/km^{2} (5,323/sq mi)
  - Urban: 115,041
  - Metro: 1,033,000 (2021 est.)
  - Demonym: Mendozan (Mendocino/-a Spanish)

GDP (PPP, constant 2015 values)
  - Year: 2023
  - Total: $28.7 billion
  - Per capita: $23,400
- Time zone: UTC−3 (ART)
- CPA Base: M 5500
- Area code: +54 261
- Climate: BWk
- Website: ciudaddemendoza.gov.ar

Mendoza (Latin American Spanish: [menˈdosa]), officially the City of Mendoza (Spanish: Ciudad de Mendoza), is the capital of the province of Mendoza in Argentina. It is located in the northern-central part of the province, in a region of foothills and high plains, on the eastern side of the Andes. As of the 2010 census [INDEC], Mendoza had a population of 115,041 with a metropolitan population of 1,055,679, making Greater Mendoza the fourth largest census metropolitan area in the country.

Ruta Nacional 7, the major road running between Buenos Aires and Santiago, runs through Mendoza. The city is a frequent stopover for climbers on their way to Aconcagua (the highest mountain in the Western and Southern Hemispheres) and for adventure travelers interested in mountaineering, hiking, horse riding, rafting, and other sports. In the winter, skiers come to the city for easy access to the Andes.

Two of the main industries of the Mendoza area are olive oil production and Argentine wine. The region around Greater Mendoza is the largest wine-producing area in South America. As such, Mendoza is one of the eleven Great Wine Capitals, and the city is an emerging enotourism destination and base for exploring the region's hundreds of wineries located along the Argentina Wine Route.

== History ==
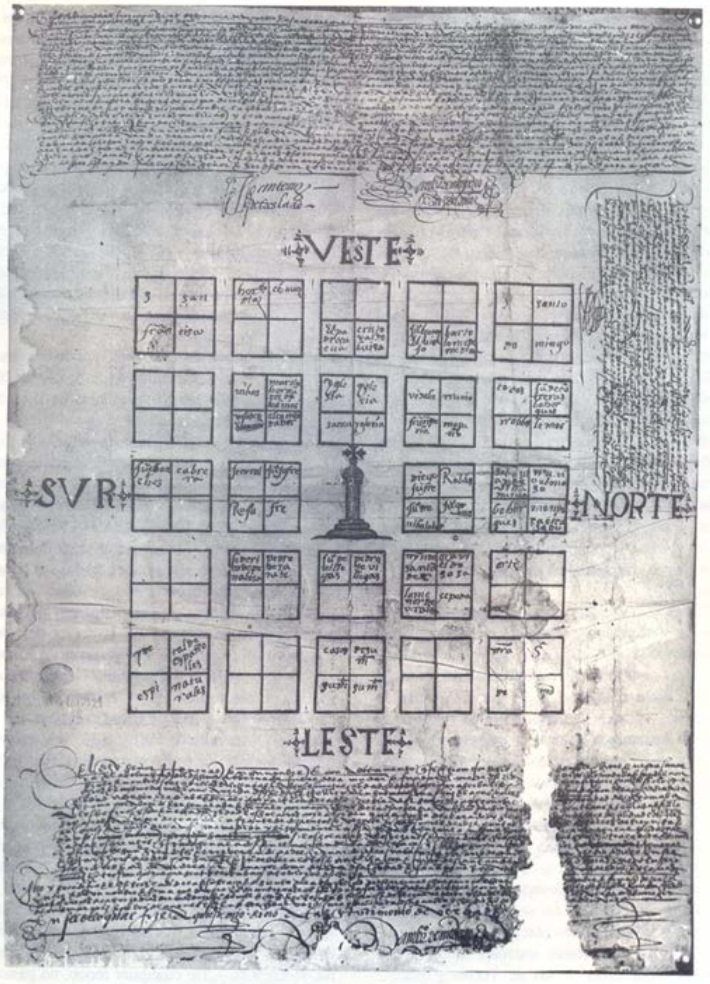
Print of the second foundation of Mendoza, 1562

On 2 March 1561, Pedro del Castillo founded the city and named it Ciudad de Mendoza del Nuevo Valle de La Rioja after the governor of Chile, Don García Hurtado de Mendoza. Before the 1560s the area was populated by tribes known as the Huarpes and Puelches. The Huarpes devised a system of irrigation that was later developed by the Spanish. This allowed for an increase in population that might not have otherwise occurred. The system is still evident today in the wide trenches (acequias), which run along all city streets, watering the approximately 100,000 trees that line every street in Mendoza.

It is estimated that fewer than 80 Spanish settlers lived in the area before 1600, but later prosperity increased due to the use of indigenous and slave labor, and the Jesuit presence in the region. When nearby rivers were tapped as a source of irrigation in 1788 agricultural production increased. The extra revenues generated from this, and the ensuing additional trade with Buenos Aires, Viceroyalty on which it depended since its creation and transfer from the Captaincy General of Chile in 1776, no doubt led to the creation of the state of Cuyo in 1813 with José de San Martín as governor. It was from Mendoza that San Martín and other Argentinian and Chilean patriots organized the army with which they won the independence of Chile and Peru. Mendoza suffered a severe earthquake in 1861 that killed at least 5,000 people. The city was rebuilt, incorporating innovative urban designs that would better tolerate such seismic activity. Mendoza was rebuilt with large squares and wider streets and sidewalks than any other city in Argentina. The layout of the modern city was established in 1863, following the 1861 earthquake. It features a central main square surrounded by four smaller plazas, along with wider streets and sidewalks —such as Bartolomé Mitre Avenue and Sarmiento Avenue— designed to provide open space and better withstand seismic activity.

Tourism, wine production, and more recently the exploitation of commodities such as oil and uranium ensure Mendoza's status as a key regional centre. Important suburbs such as Godoy Cruz, Guaymallén, Las Heras and Luján de Cuyo have in recent decades far outpaced the city proper in population. Comprising half the metro population of 212,000 in 1947, these suburbs grew to nearly seven-eighths of the total metro area of over 1,000,000 by 2015, making Mendoza the most dispersed metro area in Argentina.

== Culture ==
Mendoza has several museums, including the Museo Cornelio Moyano, a natural history museum, and the Museo del Área Fundacional (Historical Regional Foundation Museum) on Pedro del Castillo Square. The Museo Nacional del Vino (National Wine Museum), focusing on the history of winemaking in the area, is 17 kilometres (11 miles) southeast of Mendoza in Maipú. The Casa de Fader, a historic house museum, is an 1890 mansion once home to artist Fernando Fader in nearby Mayor Drummond, 14 kilometres (9 miles) south of Mendoza. The mansion is home to many of the artist's paintings.

Mendoza also has two major symphony orchestras and one Baroque ensemble. Orquesta Sinfónica de la Universidad Nacional de Cuyo is an institution that belongs to the University of Cuyo. The idea was sparked by a dedicated group of musicians who dreamt of a university-based symphonic ensemble (1942-1947). This vision began to take shape under the rectorate of Dr. Irineo Fernando Cruz. Official Foundation (1948): The orchestra was officially established on June 10, 1948. Its first conductor and driving force was the legendary Maestro Julio Perceval, who also led the Conservatory of Music. A Legacy of Excellence: Over its nearly 80-year history, the orchestra has been led by a "who's who" of international conductors, including Paul Hindemith, Charles Dutoit, and Ligia Amadio. Modern Era: In 2014, the orchestra moved its headquarters to the Nave UNCUYO (the University's cultural center in Mendoza City), providing a modern, dedicated space for rehearsals and performances. As of 2026, the artistic direction continues under the leadership of Maestro Tobias Volkmann. https://orquesta.uncuyo.edu.ar/ .

The Orquesta Filarmónica de Mendoza has a rich history that mirrors the cultural evolution of the Cuyo region. It began as a small state-led initiative and grew into one of the most respected symphonic bodies in South America. Origins and Foundation 1930s-1940s: The roots of the orchestra lie in the Sinfónica de Mendoza, which was part of the Conservatory of Music. It was initially a training ground for local talent. Official Decree (1948): The orchestra was formally established as a professional state entity on April 16, 1948, under the name Orquesta Sinfónica Provincial. The Transition: In 1992, the ensemble was reorganized and officially rebranded as the Orquesta Filarmónica de Mendoza (OFM), reflecting a shift toward a more expansive, professionalized repertoire and a higher international standard. Artistic Milestones The OFM has been a cornerstone of Argentine high culture for over 75 years, marked by several distinct eras: Regional Cultural Hub: Throughout the mid-20th century, Mendoza became a destination for European musicians fleeing the war, which drastically increased the technical quality of the orchestra's string and wind sections. The "Teatro Independencia" Residence: The orchestra has long been the resident ensemble of the Teatro Independencia. This venue, opened in 1925, provides the acoustics and prestige necessary for their grand symphonic cycles. Cosecha and Community: Since the early 2000s, the OFM has expanded its reach through the Fiesta de la Cosecha (Harvest Festival). This annual event at the Mendoza airport vineyards has seen the orchestra perform for tens of thousands, blending classical music with Argentine folk and rock. Iconic Collaborators The orchestra's history is defined by the caliber of the artists who have stood on its podium or performed as soloists: Conductors: It has been led by maestros such as Jean Constantinesco, César Iván Lara, and David del Pino Klinge. Soloists: The OFM has shared the stage with world-renowned figures including Martha Argerich, Bruno Gelber, and José Carreras. Today, the OFM is managed by the Ministry of Culture and Tourism of Mendoza. It continues to serve a dual purpose: preserving the traditional Austro-German symphonic canon while aggressively commissioning and performing works by contemporary Argentine composers to ensure the "Mendocino" sound remains relevant. mendoza.gov.ar/cultura

Barroque Ensemble of Mendoza. The most active group in this field is the Orquesta Barroca de Mendoza, directed by Maestro Hugo Mariano Peralta. While its name refers to a specific period, this ensemble has evolved since its founding in 2017 to become one of the most versatile and popular groups in the region, blending technical rigor with high-impact visual spectacles. Profile and Evolution Origins: It began as a training space for advanced students interested in the interpretation of 17th and 18th-century music (Bach, Vivaldi, Handel). Today (2026): It is now a consolidated professional orchestra that has expanded its repertoire. While they maintain Baroque programs, they are widely known for their film music productions and thematic concerts.

The Fiesta Nacional de la Vendimia (The National Grape Harvest Festival) occurs in early March each year. Part of the festivities include a beauty pageant, where 17 beauty queens from each department of Mendoza Province compete, and one winner is selected by a panel of about 50 judges. The queen of Mendoza city's department does not compete and acts as host for the other queens.

In 2008, National Geographic listed Mendoza as one of the top 10 historic destinations in the world.

== Urban structure ==
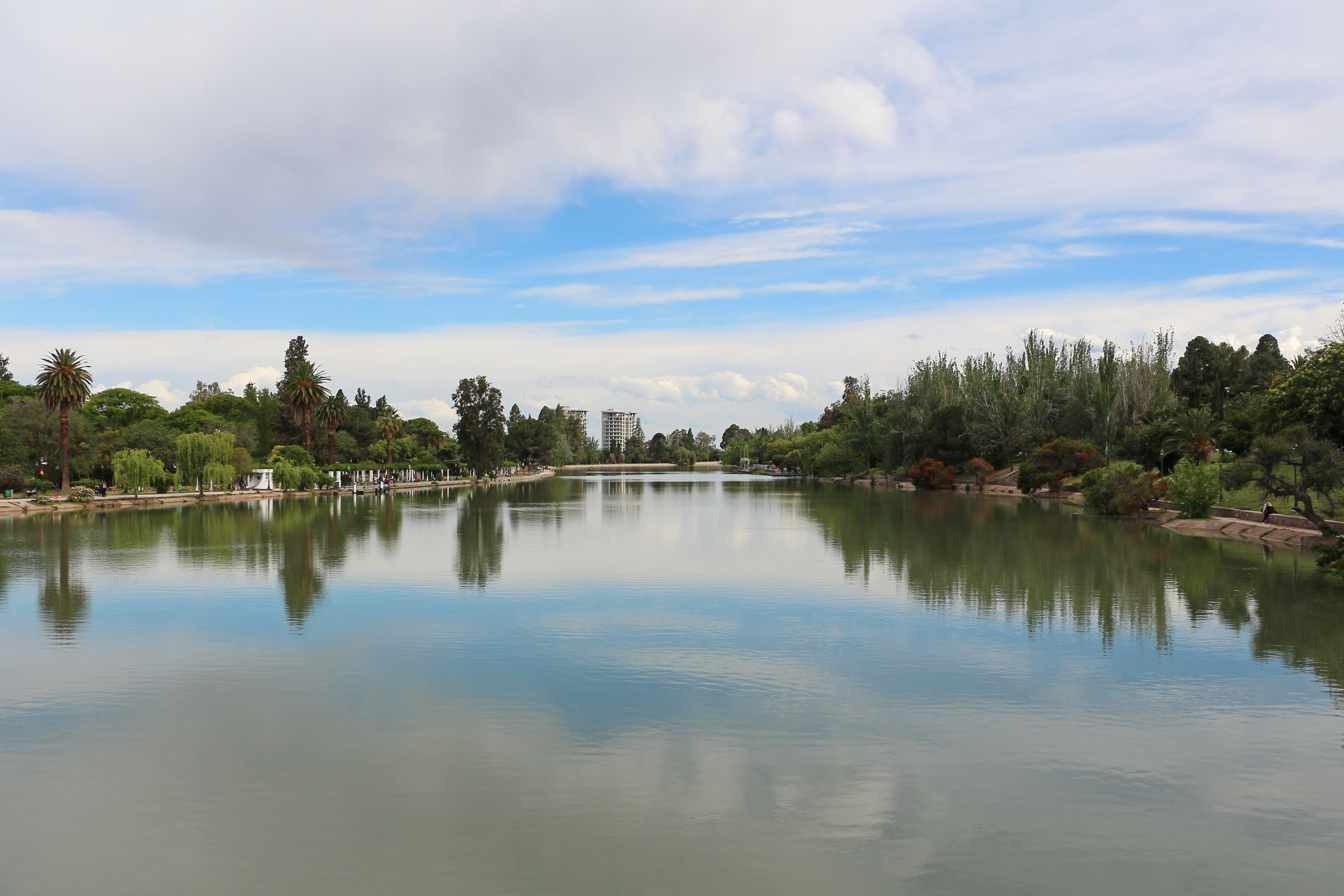
Lake in General San Martín Park

The city is centred around Plaza Independencia (Independence Plaza) with Avenida Sarmiento running through its centre east–west, with the east side pedestrianized (peatonal). Other major streets, running perpendicular to Sarmiento, include Bartolomé Mitre, San Martín, and 9 de Julio (9 July), those running parallel include Colón, and Las Heras. Four smaller plazas, San Martín, Chile, Italia, and España, are located 2 blocks off each corner of Independence Plaza. Unique to Mendoza are the exposed stone ditches, essentially small canals, which run alongside many of the roads supplying water to the thousands of trees.

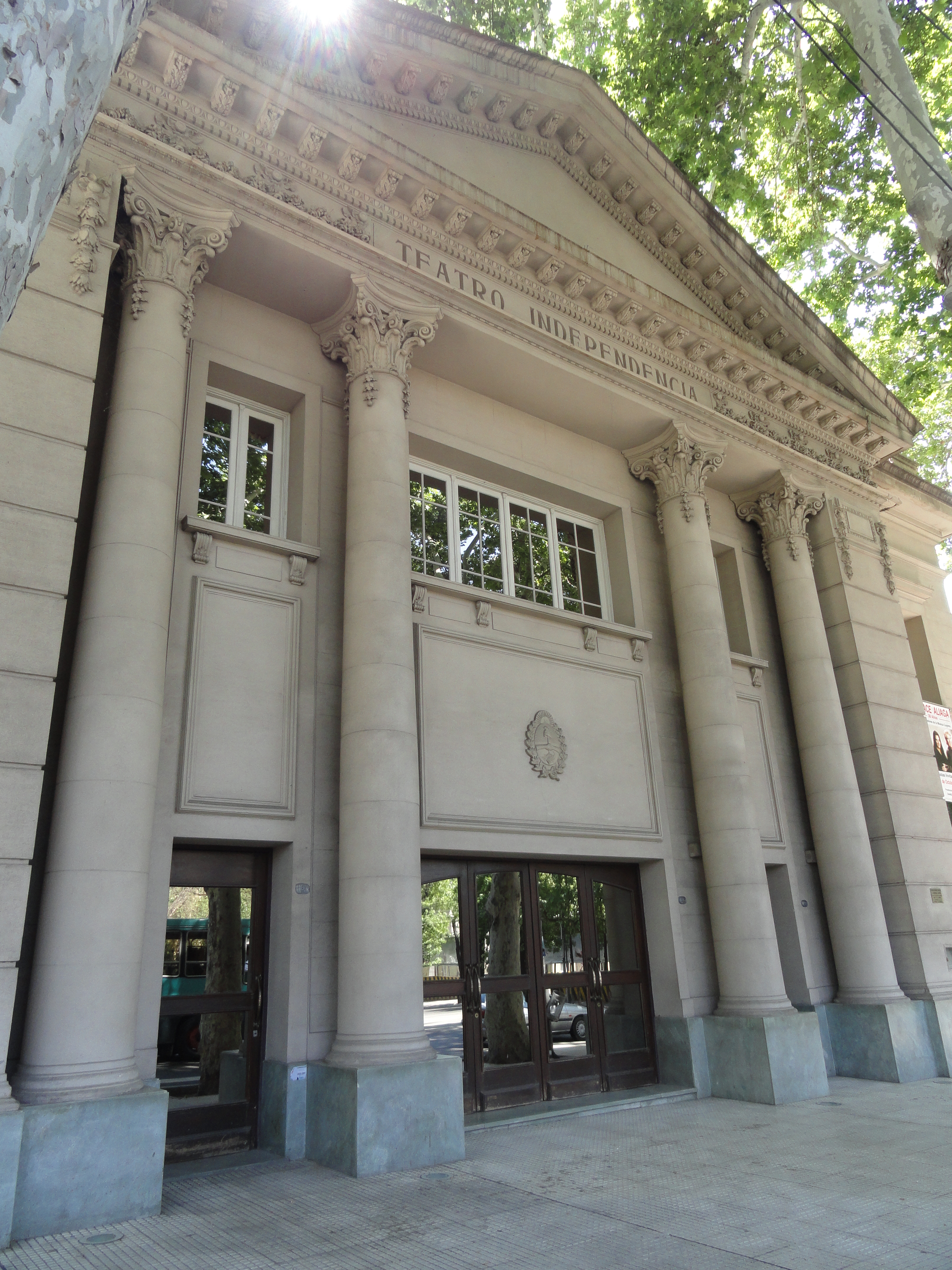
Teatro Independencia

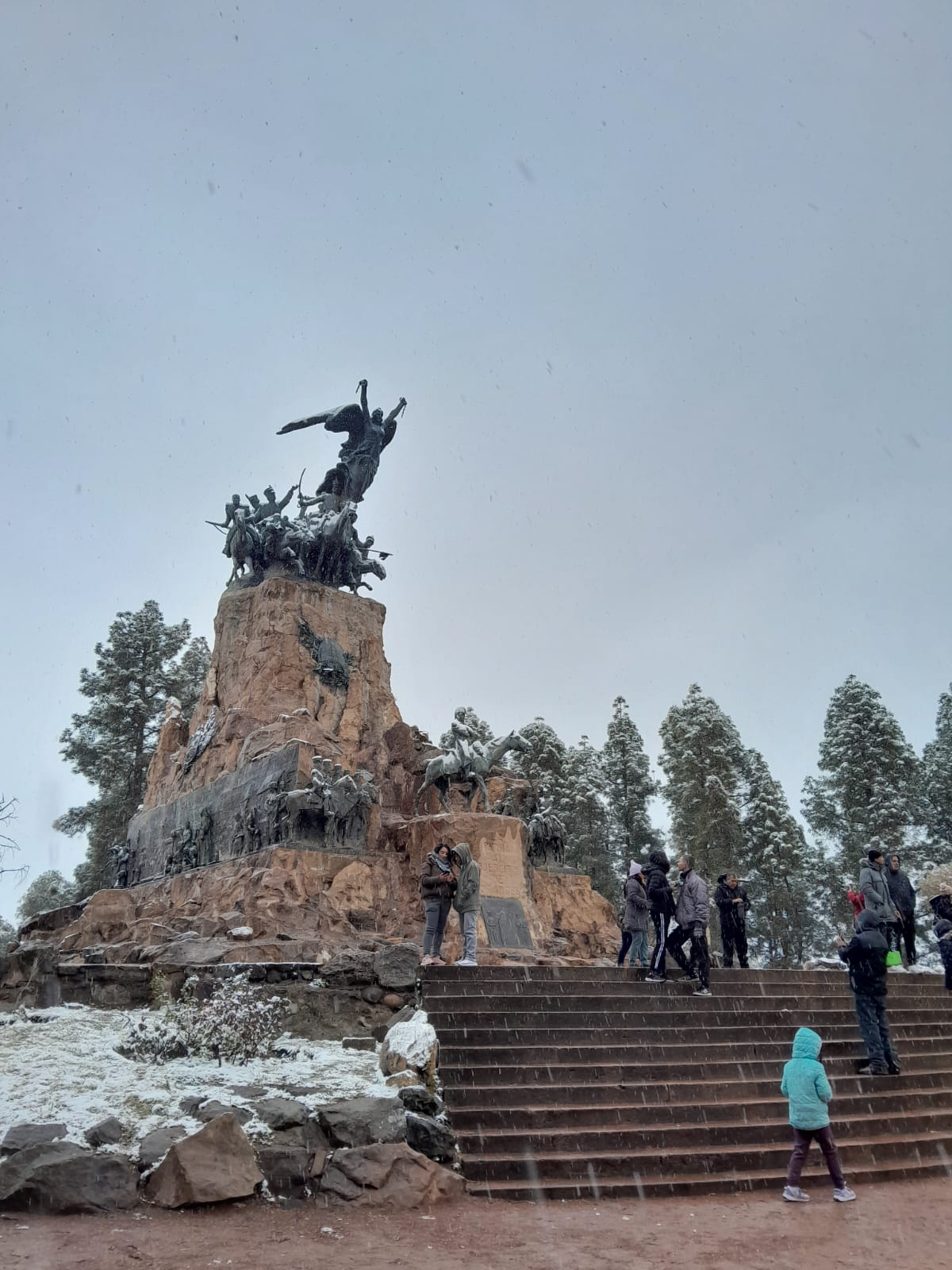
Cerro de la Gloria

Parque General San Martín (General San Martín Park) was designed by Carlos Thays. Its grounds include the Mendoza Zoological Park and a football stadium, and it is also the home of the Universidad Nacional de Cuyo. A view of the city is available from the top of Cerro de la Gloria (Mt. Glory).

One common point of interest is the Teatro Independencia ("Independence Theatre"), the premier performing arts venue in Mendoza. Supervised by the nation's Ministry of Public Works, the project was commissioned to architect Alfredo Israel, and its plans were approved in October 1923. The theatre was, as were many public works of this type in Argentina at the time, designed in a French Academy style. Its façade included a Neoclassical frontis featuring four Corinthian columns on a green marble base, a rococo frieze, the provincial escutcheon in bas-relief, and a balustrade above. The design for the interiors was based on those prevailing in Italian opera houses, and the formal vestibule is overlooked by grand marble steps leading to the concert hall. The auditorium itself includes four tiers of balconies, and its seating capacity is 730. The theatre serves as the home of the Provincial Philharmonic Orchestra. In addition, the theatre has received international personalities such as Erlend Øye and John Malkovich.

== Education ==
Mendoza has a number of universities, including the major Universidad Nacional de Cuyo, as well as University of Mendoza, a branch of Universidad Congreso, Aconcagua University, UTN (Universidad Tecnologica Nacional) and Champagnat University.

Mendoza is a popular place to learn Spanish, and there are a number of Spanish language schools, including Intercultural, Green Fields and SIMA.

== Transportation ==
Mendoza is 1,037 km (644 mi) from Buenos Aires (14 hours by bus) and 380 km (236 mi) from Santiago, Chile (6–7 hours by bus). Gov. Francisco Gabrielli International Airport serves Mendoza, with flights to/from Buenos Aires taking less than 2 hours and less than 1 hour to/from Santiago.

The public transport system includes buses, the Mendoza trolleybus system, and taxis. The trolleybuses are more comfortable than the diesel buses, but are slower, not as numerous nor is the system as extensive. In 2008, TransLink of Vancouver, British Columbia, Canada, sold most of its old trolleybus fleet to Mendoza.

A heritage railway, El Tren del Vino (The Wine Train), is being planned which will also provide local transportation; it will run through wine-producing districts of Mendoza.

=== Metrotranvía ===
A 17-kilometre (11 mi) light rail line, the Metrotranvía Mendoza, opened for regular service in October 2012. It serves the areas of Las Heras, Godoy Cruz and Maipú in the Greater Mendoza conurbation, as well as the central area of Mendoza itself. The line runs from Avellaneda station in the Panquehua neighborhood of Las Heras to Gutiérrez in Maipú, stopping also at the Mendoza Railway Station at the site of the former intercity passenger train station, near the city centre. The bright red railcars, Siemens-Duewag U2s, were purchased from the San Diego Metropolitan Transit System (MTS) in 2010. They were built in 1980.

=== Transandine Railway ===
Mendoza's development was helped partly due to its position at the start of the Transandine Railway linking it to Santa Rosa de Los Andes in Chile. It was the only railway operable between Argentina and Chile. After many years of inactivity, it remains currently abandoned.

The railway is a 1,000 mm (3 ft 3 3/8 in) metre gauge line, with sections of Abt rack, whilst the railways it links with are both 1,676 mm (5 ft 6 in) broad gauge. A journey from Buenos Aires to Chile involved two breaks-of-gauge, and therefore two changes of train, one at Mendoza, and the other at Santa Rosa de Los Andes.

== Wine industry ==
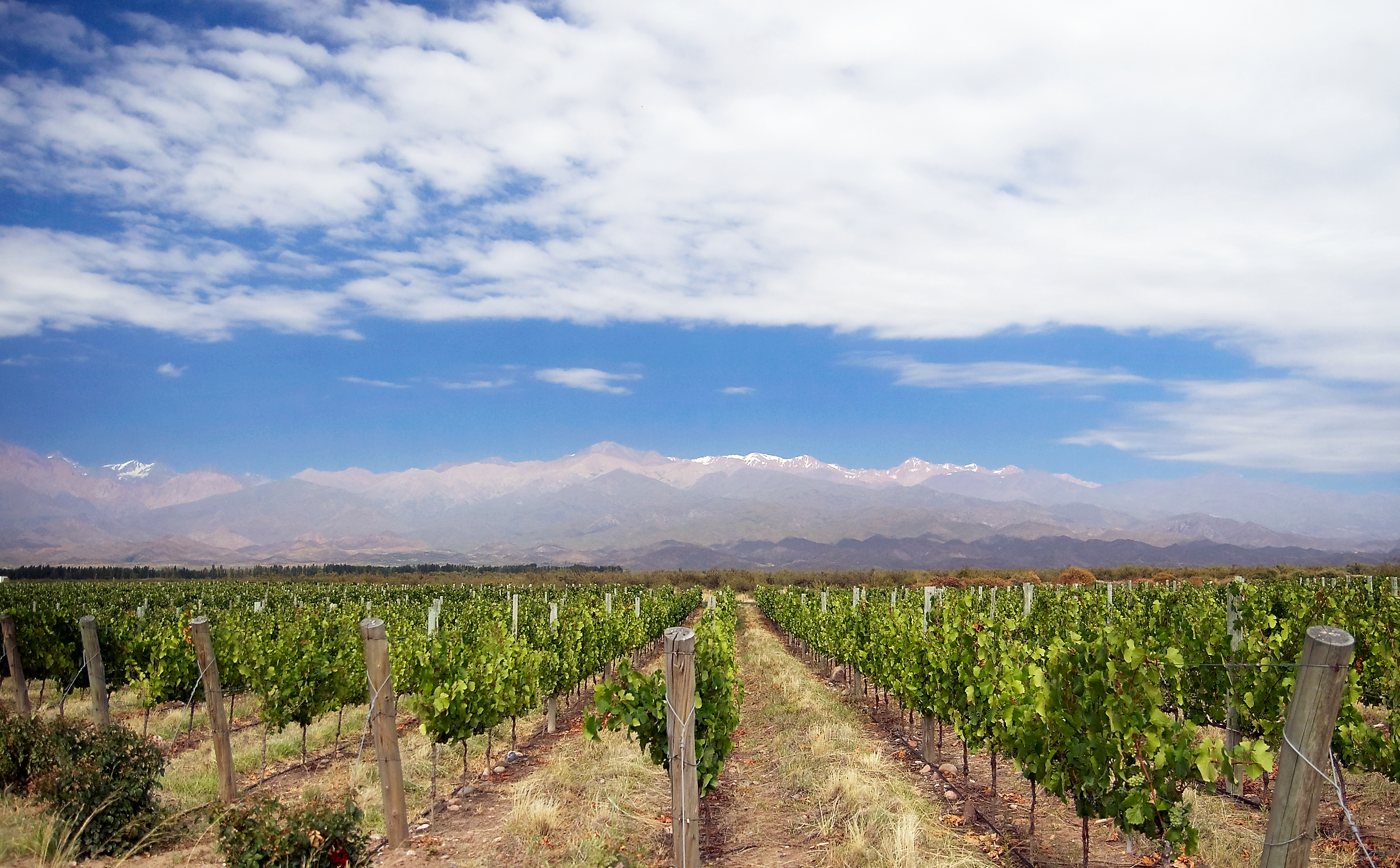
Vineyards in Uco Valley

Argentina's Malbec wines originate from Mendoza's high-altitude wine regions of Lujan de Cuyo and the Uco Valley. These districts are located in the foothills of the Andes mountains between 2,800 and 5,000 feet elevation. Vintner Nicolas Catena Zapata is considered the pioneer of high-altitude growing and was the first, in 1994, to plant a malbec vineyard at 5,000 feet above sea level in the Mendoza region. His family is also credited with making world-class wines and giving status to the wines of Argentina.

The subject of elevation is of much interest to the wine world because with increased altitude, the intensity of the sunlight increases. The role of this increased light intensity is currently being investigated by Catena Zapata's research and development department headed up by Laura Catena, Alejandro Vigil and Fernando Buscema.

== In media ==
Seven Years in Tibet, directed by French director Jean-Jacques Annaud and starring Brad Pitt, was shot in and around Mendoza. Several dozens of sets were built, ranging from a 220-yard (200 m) long recreation of the Tibetan capital city of Lhasa (built in the foothills of the Andes), to a 9,000-square-foot (840 m^{2}) recreation of the Hall of Good Deeds in the Potala, the ancient palace of the Dalai Lama (built in an abandoned garlic warehouse outside the city).

Mendoza appears as the penultimate level of the 2021 video game Hitman 3. It contains hints of Argentine culture, such as mate, tango, and wine production.

== Climate ==
Mendoza's climate is characterised as an arid (Köppen climate classification BWk); with continental characteristics. Most precipitation in Mendoza falls in the summer months (November–March). Summers are hot and humid where mean temperatures exceed 25 °C (77 °F). Average temperatures for January (summer) are 32 °C (90 °F) during daytime, and 18.4 °C (65.1 °F) at night. Winters are cold and dry with mean temperatures below 8 °C (46.4 °F). Night time temperatures can occasionally fall below freezing during the winter. Because winters are dry with little precipitation, snowfall is uncommon, occurring once per year. July (winter) the average temperatures are 14.7 °C (58.5 °F) and 2.4 °C (36 °F), day and night respectively. Mendoza's annual rainfall is only 223.2 mm (8.8 in), so extensive farming is made possible by irrigation from major rivers. The highest temperature recorded was 44.4 °C (111.9 °F) on 30 January 2003, This previous record was surpassed by the new temperature record of 44.9 °C (112.8 °F) recorded on 16 December 2023, while the lowest temperature recorded was −7.8 °C (18.0 °F) on 10 July 1976.

Climate data for Mendoza Airport, Argentina (1991–2020, extremes 1949–present)
Month	Jan	Feb	Mar	Apr	May	Jun	Jul	Aug	Sep	Oct	Nov	Dec	Year
Record high °C (°F)	44.4 (111.9)	41.5 (106.7)	37.8 (100.0)	34.0 (93.2)	33.0 (91.4)	30.4 (86.7)	33.0 (91.4)	34.4 (93.9)	36.0 (96.8)	40.1 (104.2)	40.8 (105.4)	44.9 (112.8)	44.9 (112.8)
Mean daily maximum °C (°F)	32.8 (91.0)	31.0 (87.8)	28.1 (82.6)	23.3 (73.9)	18.7 (65.7)	15.9 (60.6)	15.3 (59.5)	18.6 (65.5)	21.8 (71.2)	25.7 (78.3)	29.2 (84.6)	32.0 (89.6)	24.4 (75.9)
Daily mean °C (°F)	25.9 (78.6)	24.1 (75.4)	21.5 (70.7)	16.5 (61.7)	12.1 (53.8)	8.7 (47.7)	7.9 (46.2)	10.8 (51.4)	14.5 (58.1)	18.7 (65.7)	22.3 (72.1)	25.1 (77.2)	17.3 (63.1)
Mean daily minimum °C (°F)	19.3 (66.7)	17.8 (64.0)	15.7 (60.3)	10.8 (51.4)	6.8 (44.2)	3.1 (37.6)	2.0 (35.6)	4.3 (39.7)	7.8 (46.0)	11.9 (53.4)	15.4 (59.7)	18.1 (64.6)	11.1 (52.0)
Record low °C (°F)	7.5 (45.5)	4.8 (40.6)	0.6 (33.1)	−2.3 (27.9)	−4.3 (24.3)	−7.2 (19.0)	−7.8 (18.0)	−5.9 (21.4)	−4.6 (23.7)	0.1 (32.2)	2.7 (36.9)	5.3 (41.5)	−7.8 (18.0)
Average precipitation mm (inches)	47.2 (1.86)	40.8 (1.61)	31.6 (1.24)	18.5 (0.73)	11.0 (0.43)	5.7 (0.22)	5.0 (0.20)	7.9 (0.31)	12.3 (0.48)	11.2 (0.44)	22.1 (0.87)	24.7 (0.97)	238.0 (9.37)
Average precipitation days (≥ 0.1 mm)	5.9	5.6	4.8	3.6	1.8	2.1	2.3	2.0	3.0	3.0	4.3	4.3	44.4
Average snowy days	0.0	0.0	0.0	0.0	0.1	0.1	0.7	0.2	0.1	0.0	0.0	0.0	1.1
Average relative humidity (%)	48.4	53.8	59.7	64.6	69.1	66.9	62.1	53.2	48.3	45.3	43.5	43.8	54.9
Mean monthly sunshine hours	316.2	257.1	241.8	210.0	189.1	183.0	204.6	232.5	228.0	275.9	309.0	328.6	2,975.8
Mean daily sunshine hours	10.2	9.1	7.8	7.0	6.1	6.1	6.6	7.5	7.6	8.9	10.3	10.6	8.1
Percentage possible sunshine	67	69	61	64	60	56	58	68	63	70	70	64	64
Average ultraviolet index	12	11	8	5	3	2	2	4	6	8	10	11	7
Source 1: Servicio Meteorológico Nacional (UV 1999-2019)
Source 2: NOAA (percent sun 1961–1990), Meteo climat (record highs and lows), Oficina de Riesgo Agropecuario (November and December record high and May record low only)

Climate data for Mendoza Observatory (1991–2020, extremes 1961–present)
Month	Jan	Feb	Mar	Apr	May	Jun	Jul	Aug	Sep	Oct	Nov	Dec	Year
Record high °C (°F)	40.2 (104.4)	39.7 (103.5)	34.6 (94.3)	31.5 (88.7)	29.7 (85.5)	29.5 (85.1)	33.0 (91.4)	33.6 (92.5)	35.2 (95.4)	37.0 (98.6)	39.4 (102.9)	40.1 (104.2)	40.2 (104.4)
Mean daily maximum °C (°F)	30.7 (87.3)	29.2 (84.6)	26.5 (79.7)	22.0 (71.6)	18.0 (64.4)	15.3 (59.5)	14.7 (58.5)	17.6 (63.7)	20.5 (68.9)	24.0 (75.2)	27.3 (81.1)	30.0 (86.0)	23.0 (73.4)
Daily mean °C (°F)	24.4 (75.9)	22.6 (72.7)	20.2 (68.4)	15.5 (59.9)	11.4 (52.5)	8.2 (46.8)	7.4 (45.3)	10.1 (50.2)	13.5 (56.3)	17.4 (63.3)	20.8 (69.4)	23.5 (74.3)	16.3 (61.3)
Mean daily minimum °C (°F)	18.3 (64.9)	16.9 (62.4)	15.0 (59.0)	10.9 (51.6)	7.2 (45.0)	3.9 (39.0)	2.9 (37.2)	4.9 (40.8)	7.7 (45.9)	11.2 (52.2)	14.4 (57.9)	17.1 (62.8)	10.9 (51.6)
Record low °C (°F)	6.2 (43.2)	7.7 (45.9)	1.5 (34.7)	−1.3 (29.7)	−3.6 (25.5)	−6.9 (19.6)	−6.0 (21.2)	−5.5 (22.1)	−2.6 (27.3)	0.6 (33.1)	3.2 (37.8)	4.7 (40.5)	−6.9 (19.6)
Average precipitation mm (inches)	39.6 (1.56)	44.3 (1.74)	35.7 (1.41)	23.3 (0.92)	14.8 (0.58)	8.1 (0.32)	8.3 (0.33)	10.1 (0.40)	14.6 (0.57)	13.9 (0.55)	26.5 (1.04)	27.8 (1.09)	267.0 (10.51)
Average precipitation days (≥ 0.1 mm)	6.7	6.3	6.8	4.7	4.6	2.7	3.0	3.3	4.2	4.3	4.9	5.4	56.8
Average snowy days	0.0	0.0	0.0	0.0	0.1	0.2	0.8	0.6	0.4	0.0	0.0	0.0	2.1
Average relative humidity (%)	54.3	59.7	64.1	66.7	70.4	67.6	63.5	56.4	53.9	52.2	51.3	51.5	59.3
Mean monthly sunshine hours	279.0	220.4	210.8	183.0	179.8	150.0	182.9	207.7	222.0	248.0	270.0	282.1	2,635.7
Percentage possible sunshine	64.6	59.1	55.9	54.9	56.3	50.6	58.0	61.5	62.0	62.0	64.9	64.1	58.7
Source: Servicio Meteorológico Nacional (sun 1991–2000)

== Sports ==
See Category:Sport in Mendoza, Argentina

In 1978 Mendoza hosted six matches of the 1978 FIFA World Cup. The six were played at the Malvinas Argentinas Stadium.

In 1982, Mendoza was one of the hosts of the 1982 FIVB Men's Volleyball World Championship. It was also the host of the 1994 Padel World Championship.

The city boasts multiple significant football clubs—Independiente Rivadavia and Gimnasia y Esgrima de Mendoza currently play in the Primera División, the top flight of Argentine football. A club from the nearby city of Godoy Cruz, Godoy Cruz Antonio Tomba, is currently in the second division.

International rugby test matches featuring the Argentina national rugby team have also been held in Mendoza.

== People ==
See Category:People from Mendoza, Argentina

== International relations ==
Mendoza is twinned with:

- Uriondo, Bolivia
- São Paulo, Brazil
- (United States) Nashville, US

== See also ==
- 1985 Mendoza earthquake
- 2006 Mendoza earthquake

== Sources ==
- V. Letelier (1907). Apuntes sobre el terremoto de Mendoza. Santiago
- V. Blasco Ibánez (1910). Argentina y sus Grandezas. Madrid
