= Cerro de la Gloria =

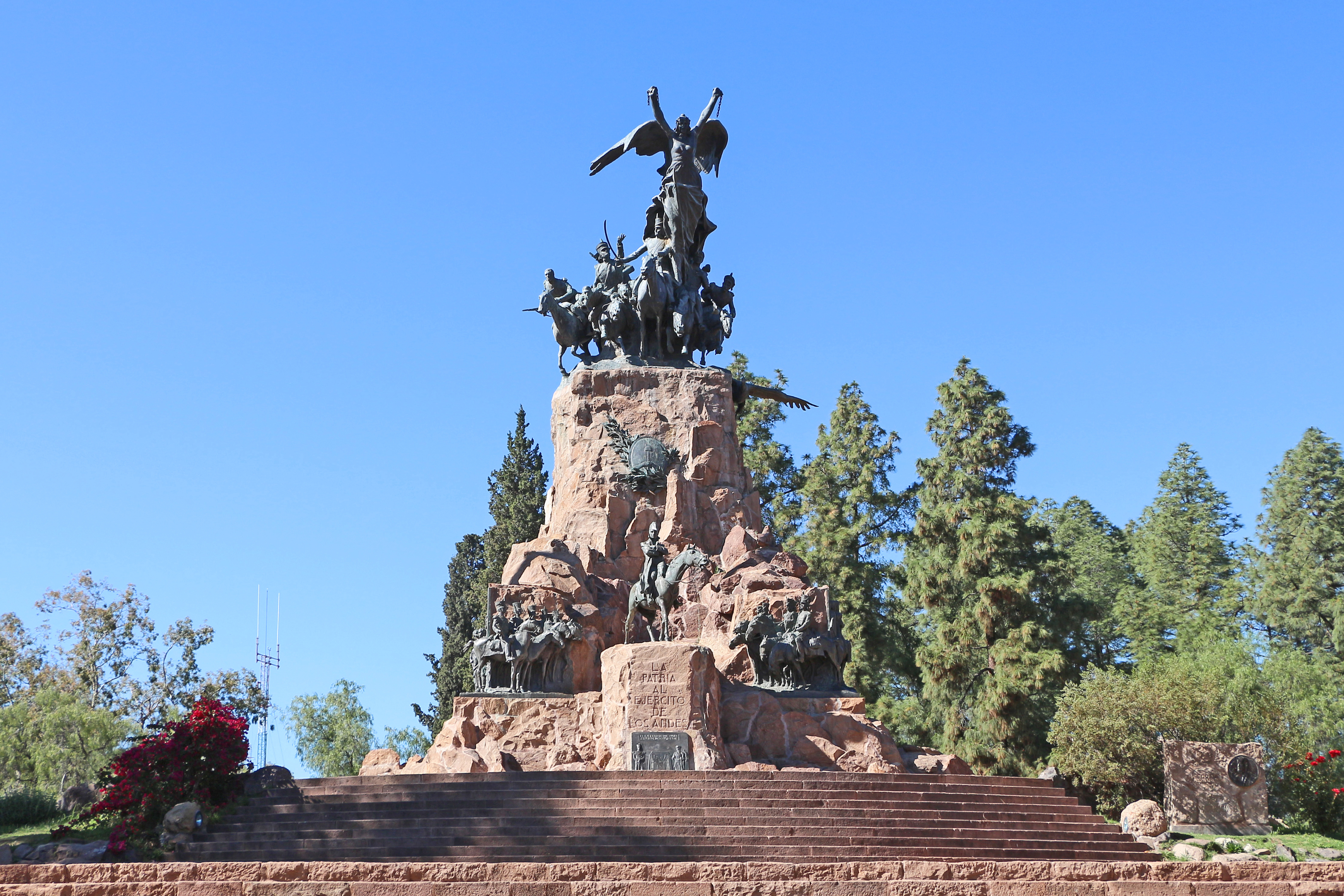
Monument to the Army of the Andes.

The Cerro de la Gloria (Glory Hill) is a small mount located in the city of Mendoza, Argentina, at the General San Martín Park. It features a huge memorial monument to the Army of the Andes at the top. The monument is the work of Uruguayan sculptor Juan Manuel Ferrari, along with the Argentines Juan Carlos Oliva Navarro, Víctor Garino, Víctor Calistri, Víctor Guarini y Víctor Cerini. It was begun in 1911, as part of the celebrations of the Argentina Centennial of 1910. It was inaugurated on February 12, 1914, an anniversary of the Battle of Chacabuco. It features at its top an allegorical representation of Freedom (Libertad) or the Republic (La República) with broken chains, and an equestrian statue of San Martin, with the inscription "La Patria al Ejército de los Andes" ("The Fatherland to the Army of the Andes").
