= General San Martín Park =

Park in Mendoza, Argentina

Coordinates: 32.890359°S 68.871212°W

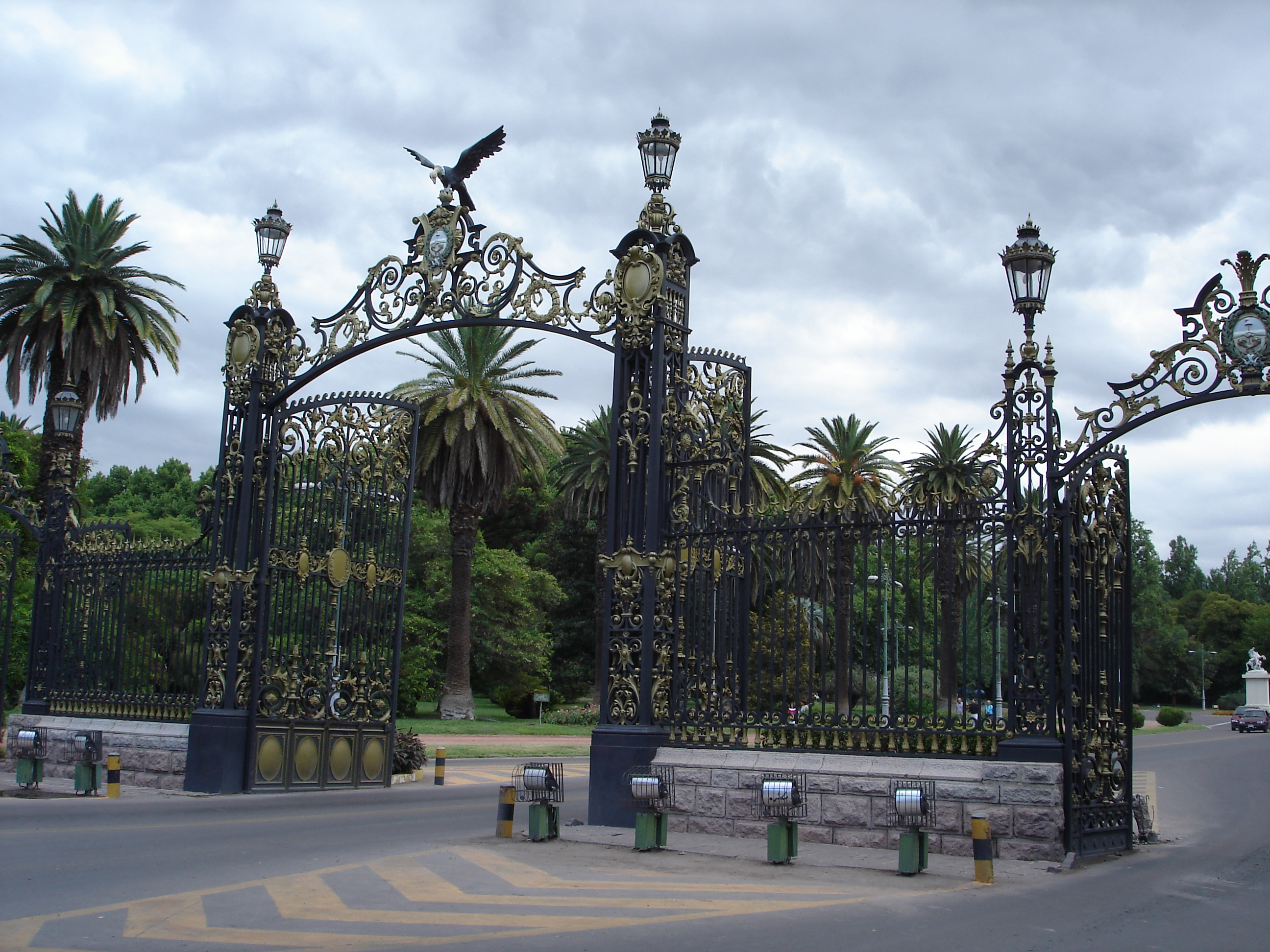
Gates of General San Martín Park

Regata Lake

The Parque General San Martín is a park located in the city of Mendoza, Argentina.

== Overview ==
The construction of the park, originally named Parque del Oeste (Western park), began on December 6, 1896, under the direction of the landscape architect Carlos Thays, who employed a combination of English and French 19th century styles in its design. The gates at the main entrance were installed in 1909, and are decorated with a condor and the coat of arms of the city. The park was renamed in honor of General José de San Martín, who led the Argentine War of Independence.

The 393 hectare (971 acre) park has 34 sculptures decorating the paths and roads. El rosedal (rose garden) is a promenade inaugurated in 1919. The park is also the location of the Estadio Malvinas Argentinas; the Universidad Nacional de Cuyo; the Monument to the Army of the Andes (created by Juan Manuel Ferrari and unveiled in 1914); The Frank Romero Day Amphitheater, site of the annual Fiesta Nacional de la Vendimia (National Grape Harvest Festival) since 1936; the Cornelio Moyano Museum of Anthropology and Natural Sciences, which maintains 40,000 exhibits; Gimnasia y Esgrima de Mendoza; the Andino Country Club; the Mendoza Lawn Tennis Club; El Pulgarcito Theater; a hippodrome; a velodrome; a botanical garden and the Mendoza Zoological Park; and a large lake inaugurated in 1906 which is the site of the Club Mendoza de Regatas (established in 1909).

== History ==
The 1861 Mendoza earthquake left the city affected by epidemics of diphtheria, cholera, and measles. These and other public health challenges figured prominently in the plans formulated for the city's reconstruction by the Minister of Works and Utilities, Emilio Civit. Civit drafted Provincial Law No. 3, which provided for a reforestation program as part of a flood control plan, as well as other improvements, such as a new prison. Following numerous delays, Law No. 19 was signed by Governor Juan Cornelio Moyano to that effect on December 6, 1896. The bill earmarked the creation of the Parque del Oeste, a "Western Park", and commissioned the noted French Argentine landscape architect Carlos Thays for its design. Thays was responsible for other important Argentine parks such as Ninth of July Park, Sarmiento Park, Parque Tres de Febrero, and Nahuel Huapi National Park.

Construction of this park sparked controversy among governing and opposition politicians in Mendoza. Governor Moyano stated that the project address public health weaknesses that persisted after the quake, while the opposition argued that this large-scale construction sought only elitist purposes, and that with a smaller amount of money major deficiencies of the day such as a lack of sewers, waterworks, and irrigation ditches could be overcome. The park proved beneficial to the Greater Mendoza in the long term, however, resulting in significantly improved air quality in the area, and well as greater investment higher real estate values.

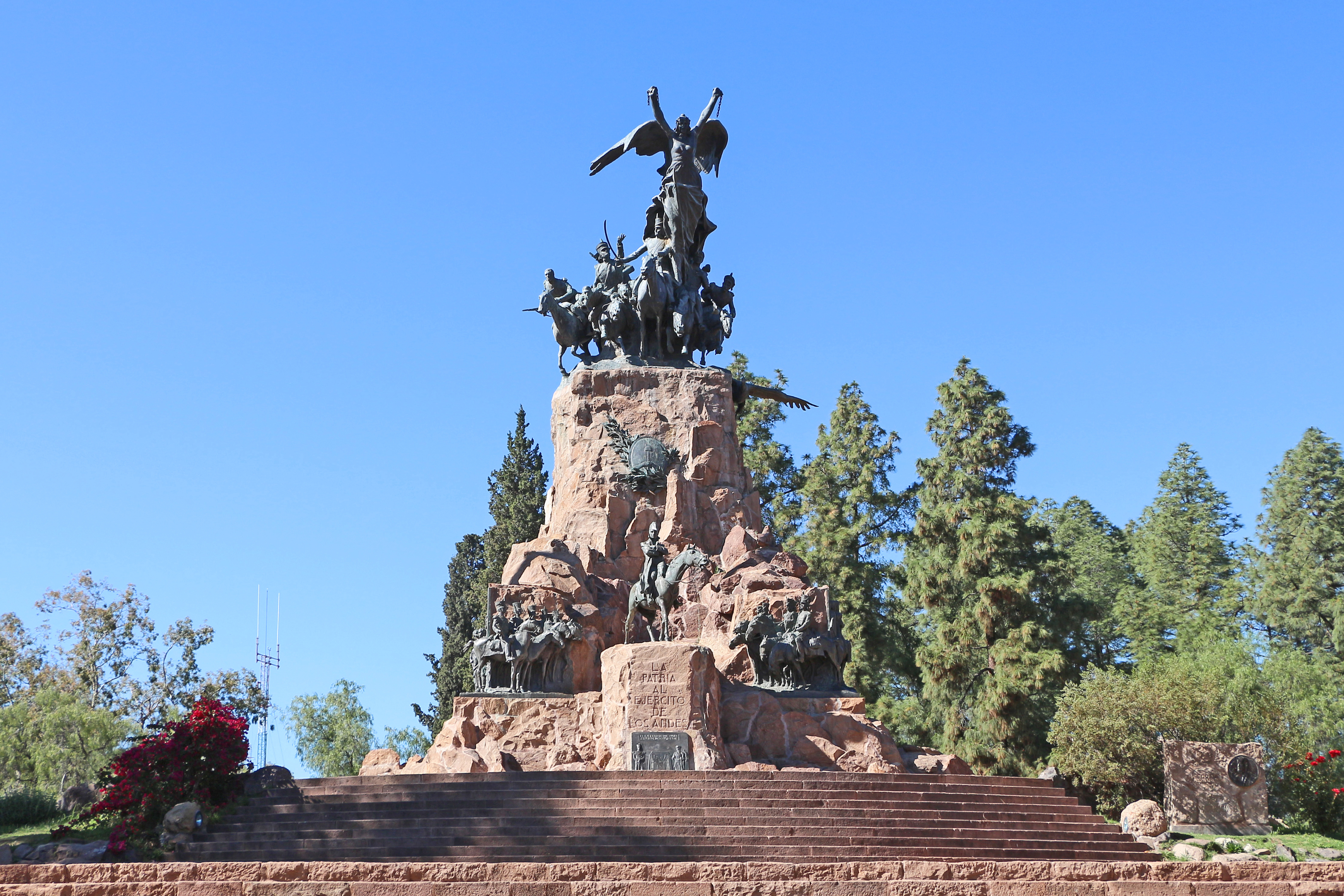
Monument to the Army of the Andes

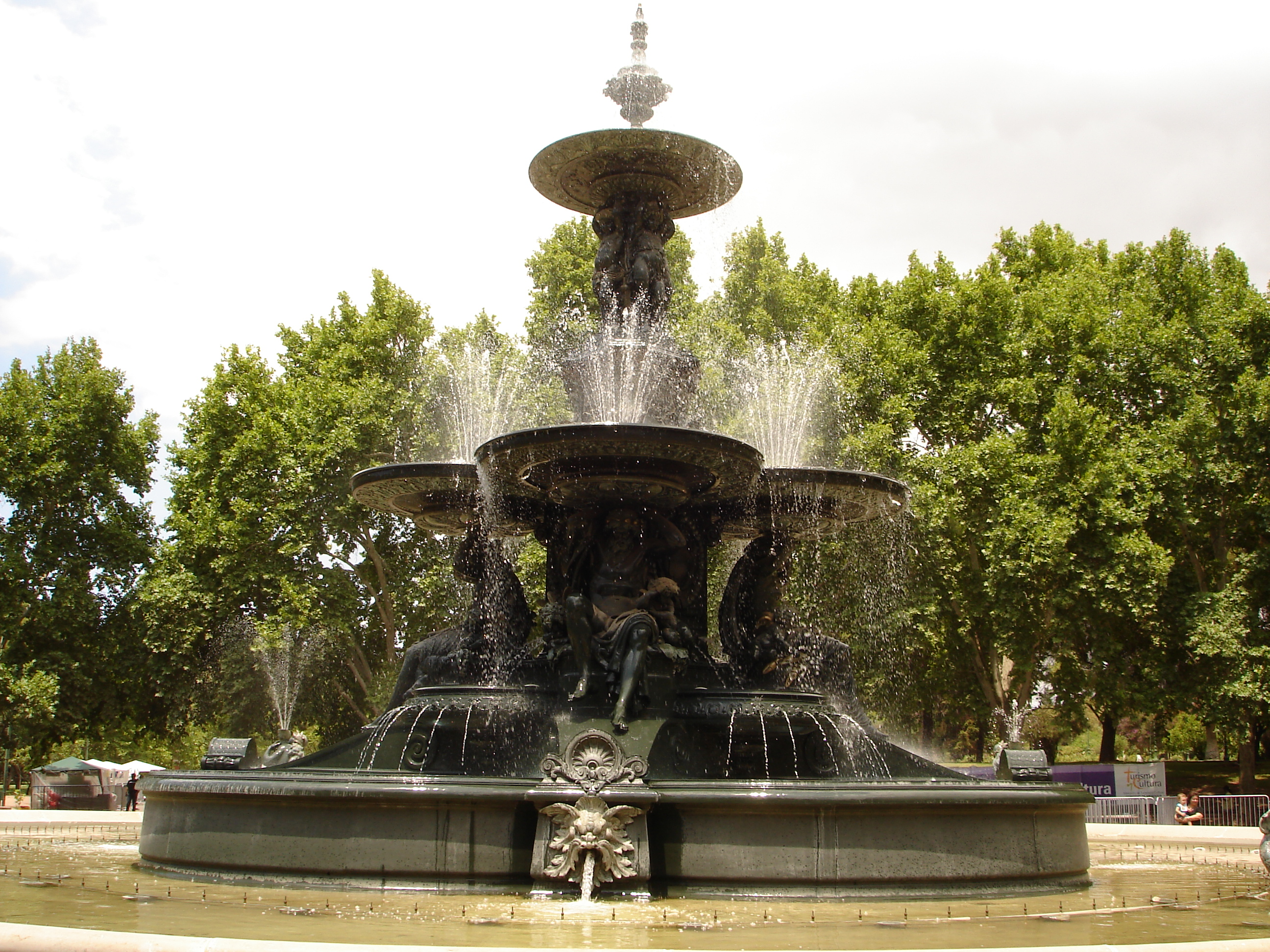
Fountain of the Continents

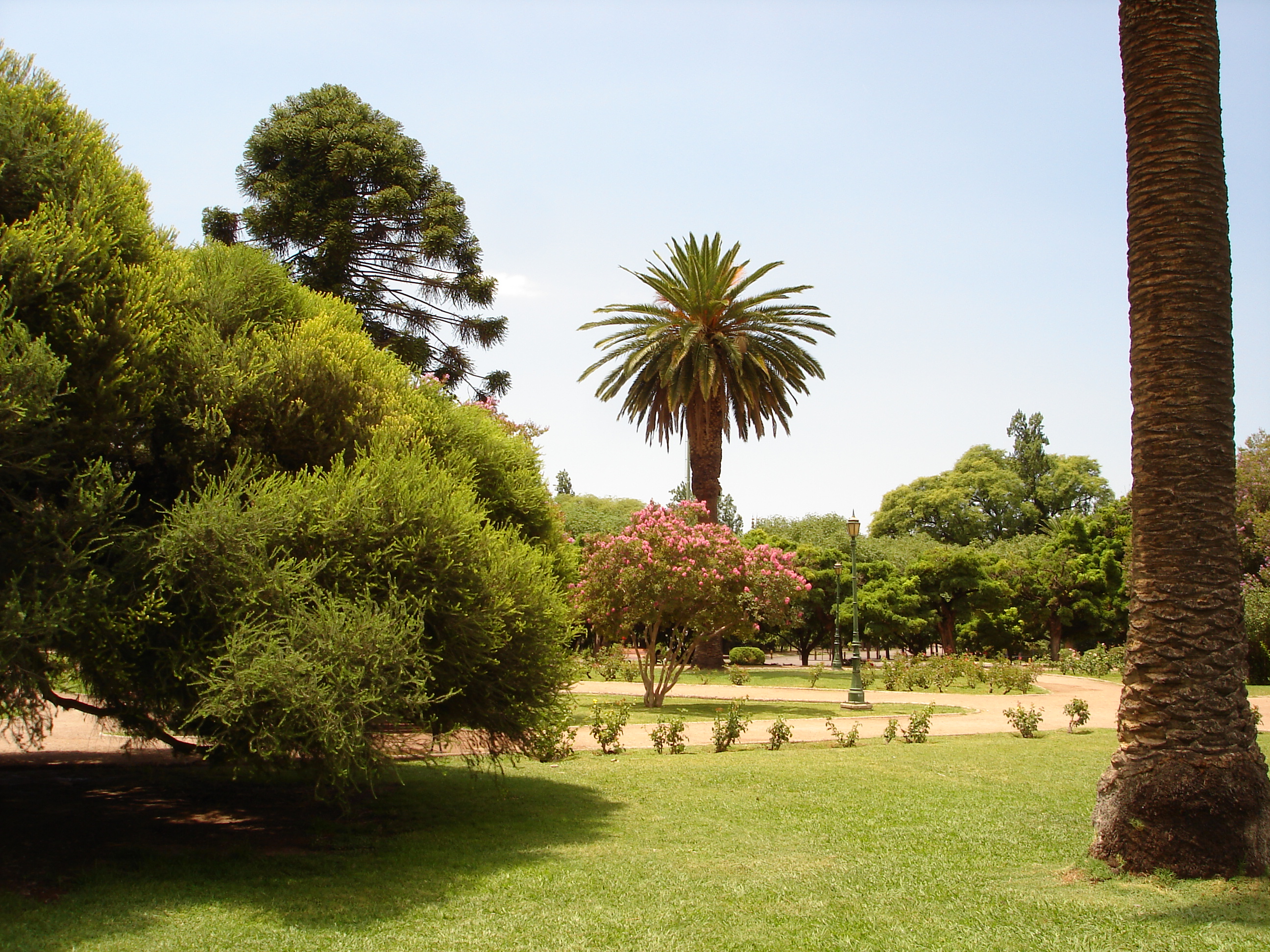
Rose Garden

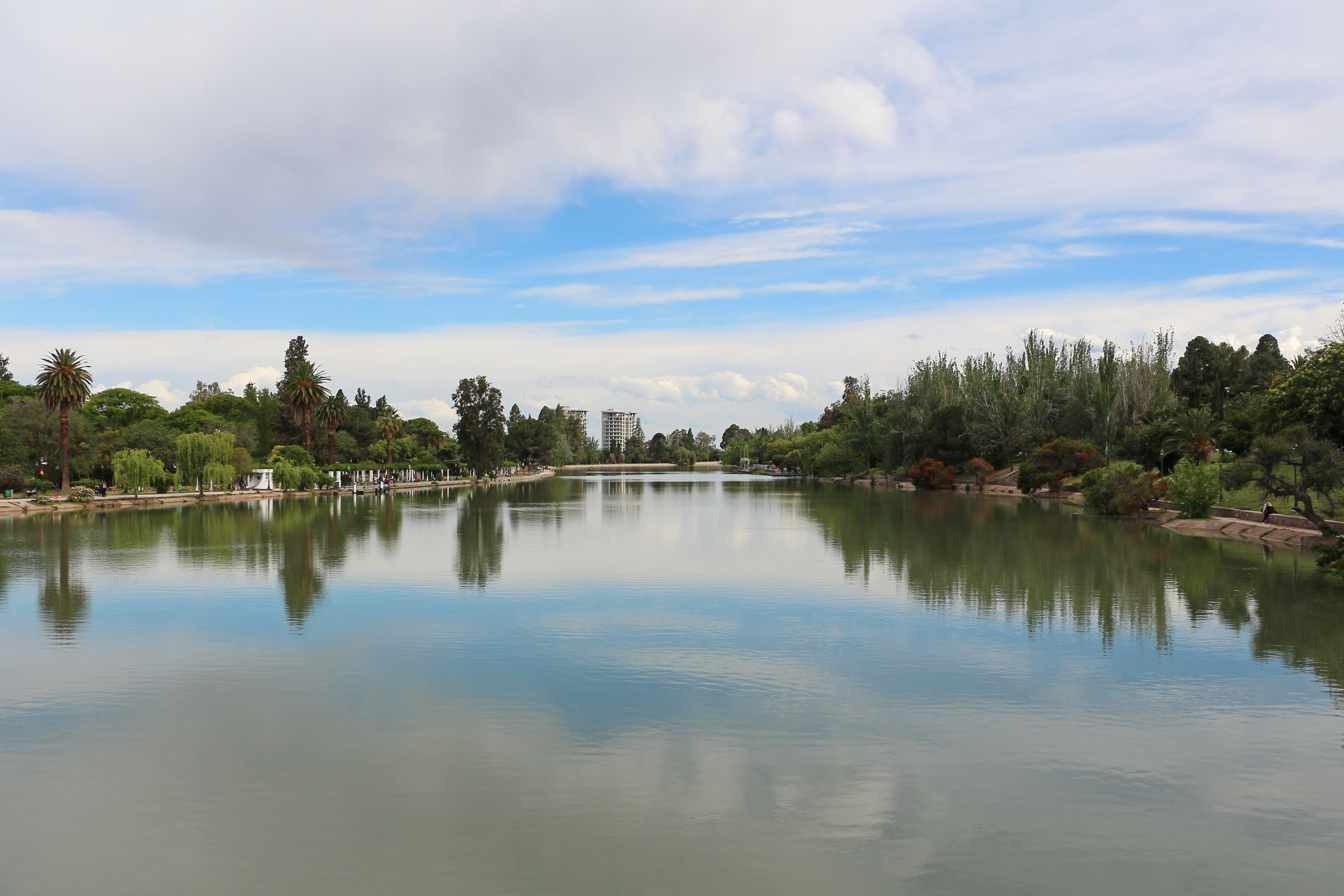
Park's lake

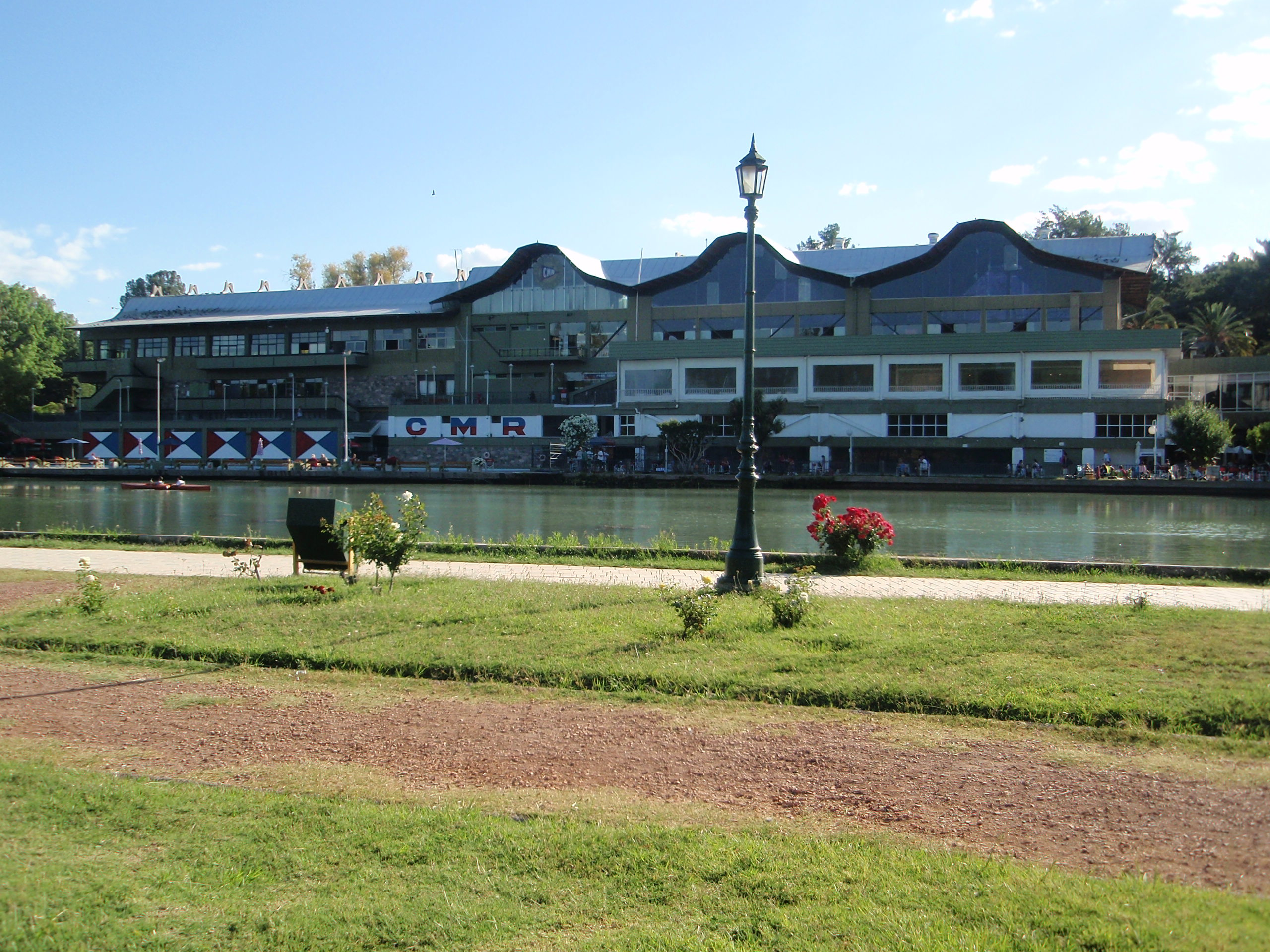
Club Mendoza de Regatas
