= Independencia station (Mendoza) =

Metrotranvía Mendoza station

Independencia station Parador Independencia
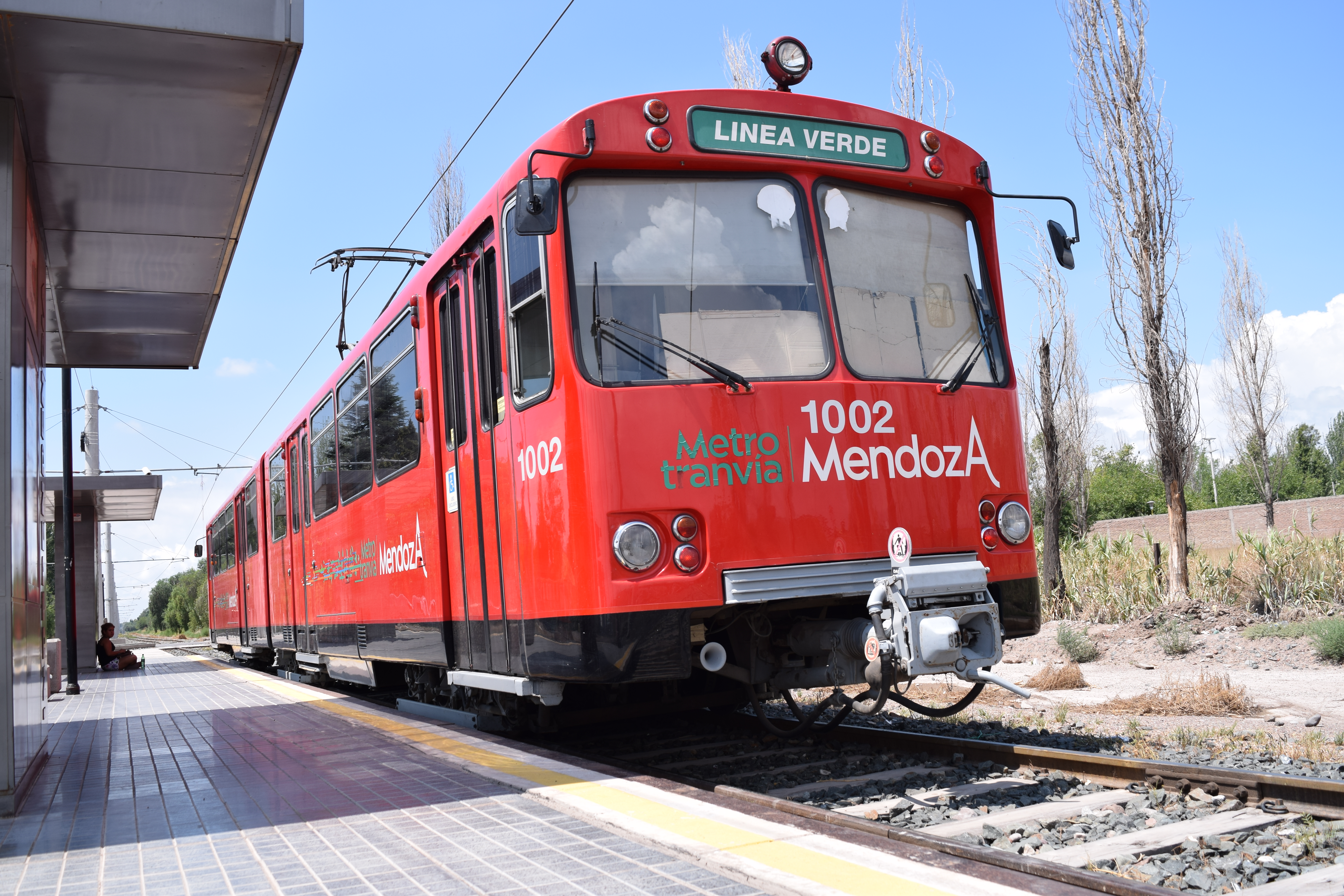

General information
- Location: Godoy Cruz; Argentina
- Coordinates: 32.932824°S 68.825959°W
- Transit authority: Sociedad de Transporte Mendoza
- Platforms: 1 island platform
- Tracks: 2

History
- Opened: 28 February 2012

Services
Preceding station	STM	Following station
Parque TIC towards General Gutiérrez	Metrotranvía Mendoza	Progreso towards Avellaneda

Independencia is a light rail station located on the intersection of Independencia and Alsina Streets in Godoy Cruz, in the Godoy Cruz Department, Mendoza Province, Argentina.

== Gallery ==
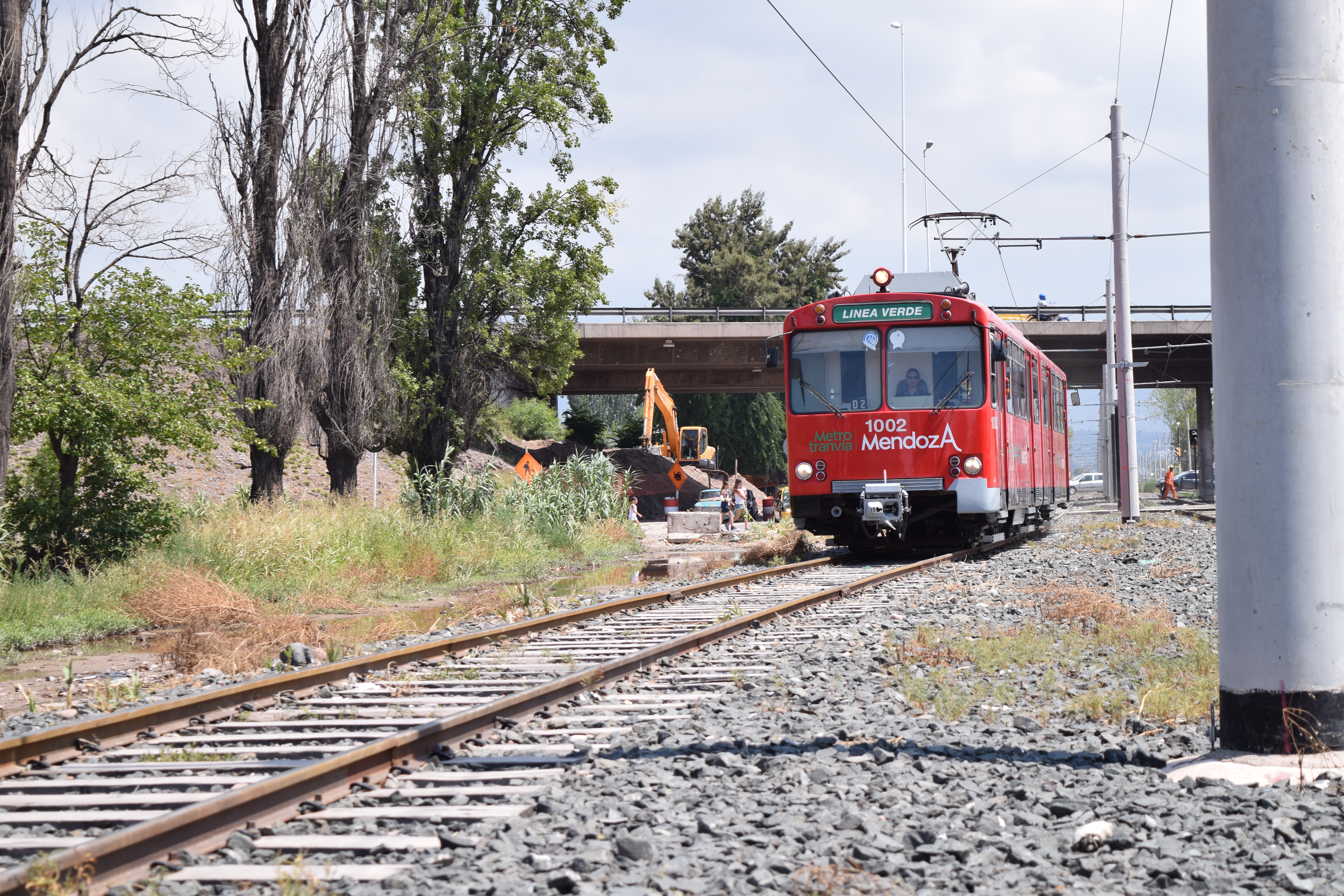

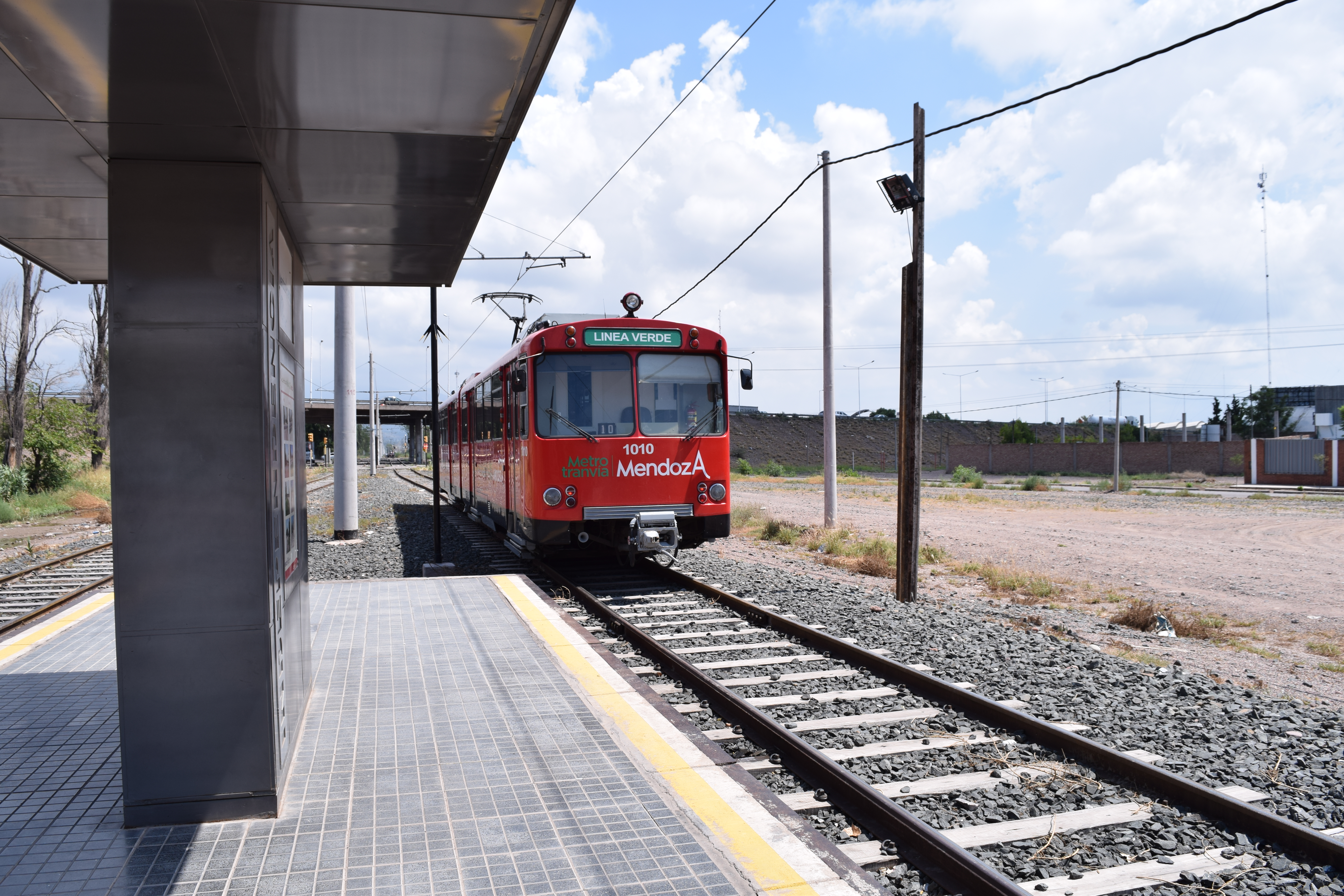

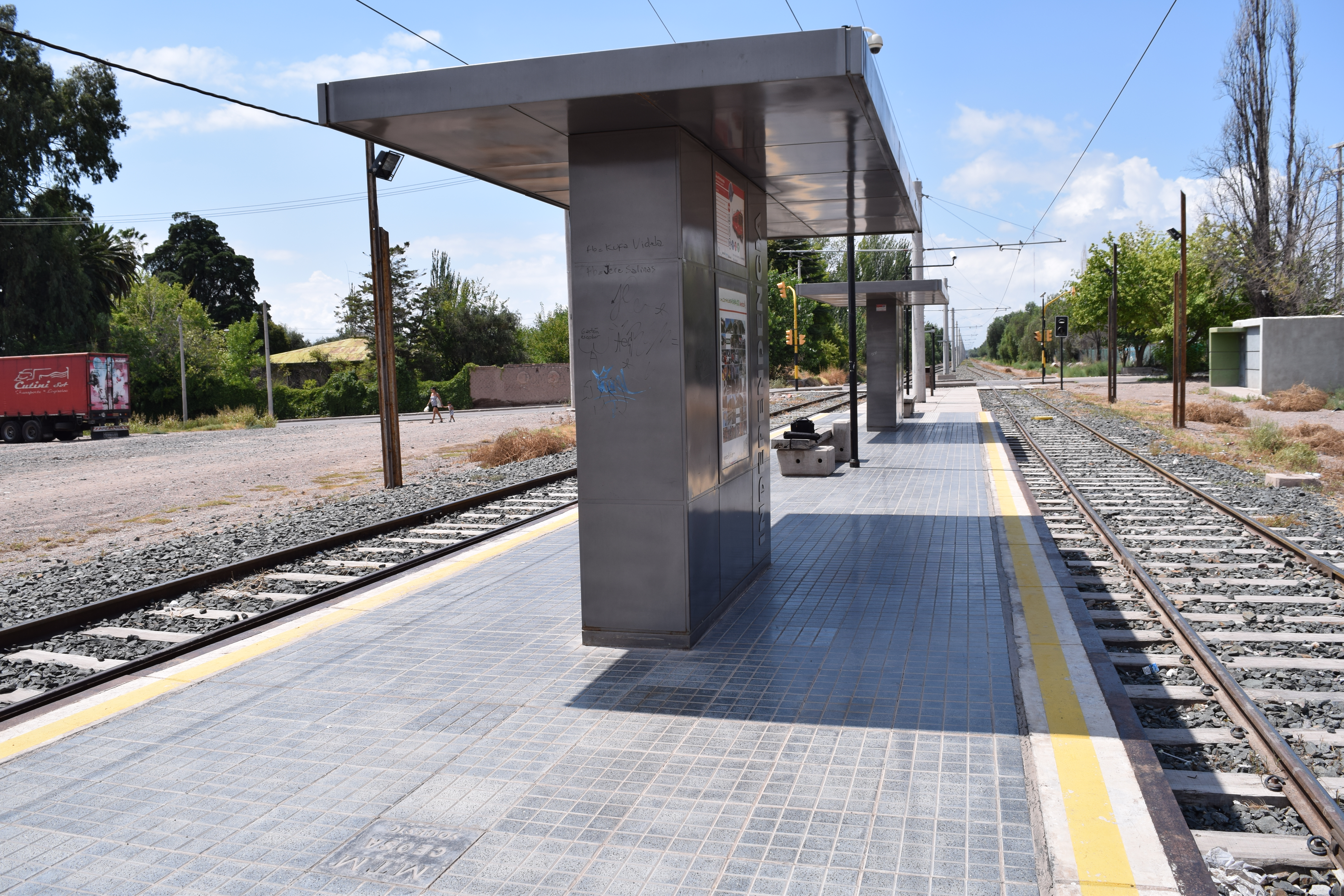
