= Progreso station =

Metrotranvía Mendoza station

Progreso station Parador Progreso
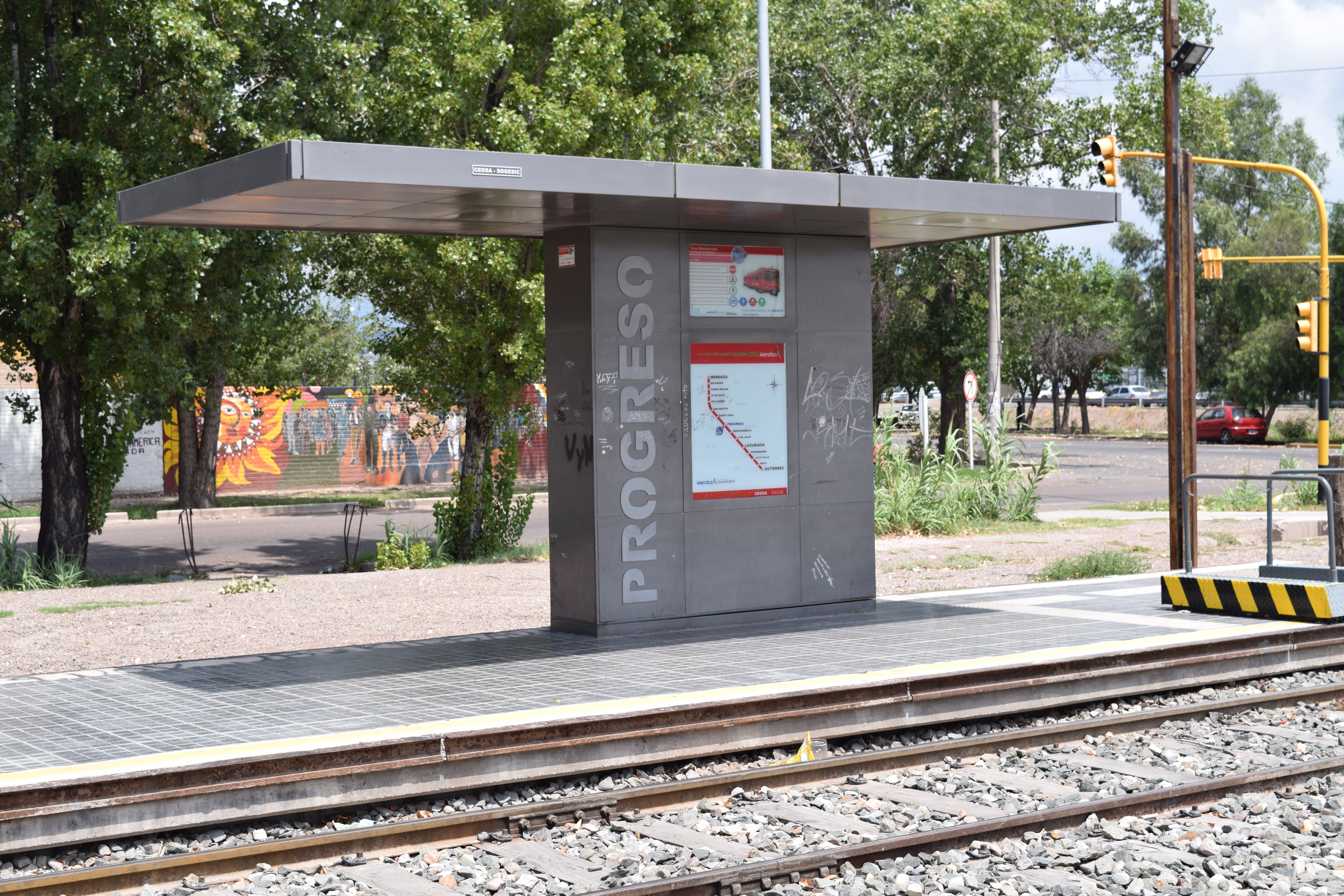

General information
- Location: Godoy Cruz; Argentina
- Coordinates: 32.926898°S 68.833210°W
- Transit authority: Sociedad de Transporte Mendoza
- Platforms: 2 side platforms
- Tracks: 2

History
- Opened: 28 February 2012

Services
Preceding station	STM	Following station
Independencia towards General Gutiérrez	Metrotranvía Mendoza	Godoy Cruz towards Avellaneda
Location

Progreso is a light rail station located at the intersection of Progreso and Valle Grande Streets, in the district of San Francisco del Monte, in Godoy Cruz Department, Mendoza Province, Argentina. It opened on 28 February 2012, as part of the first section of the Metrotranvía Mendoza.

== Images ==
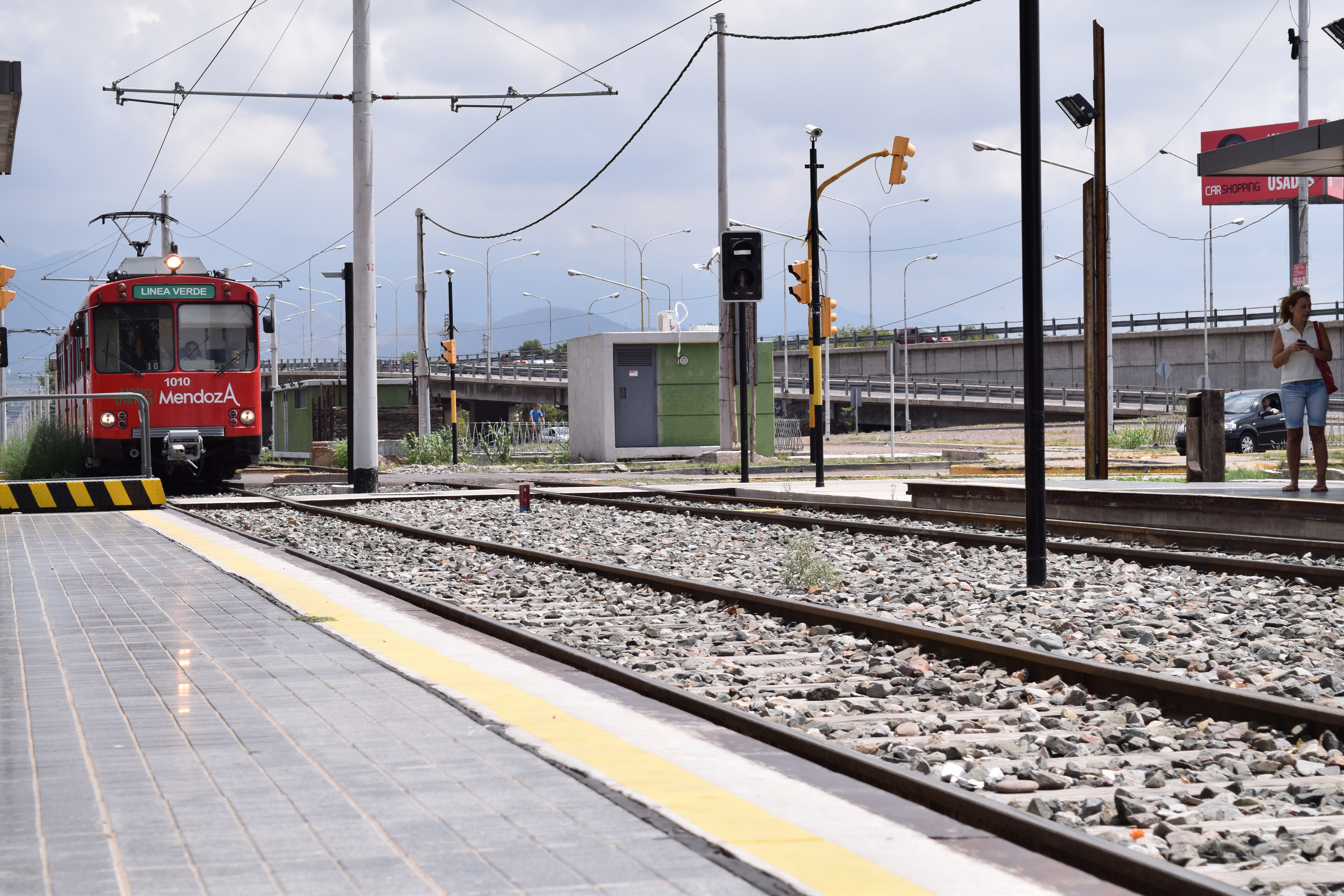

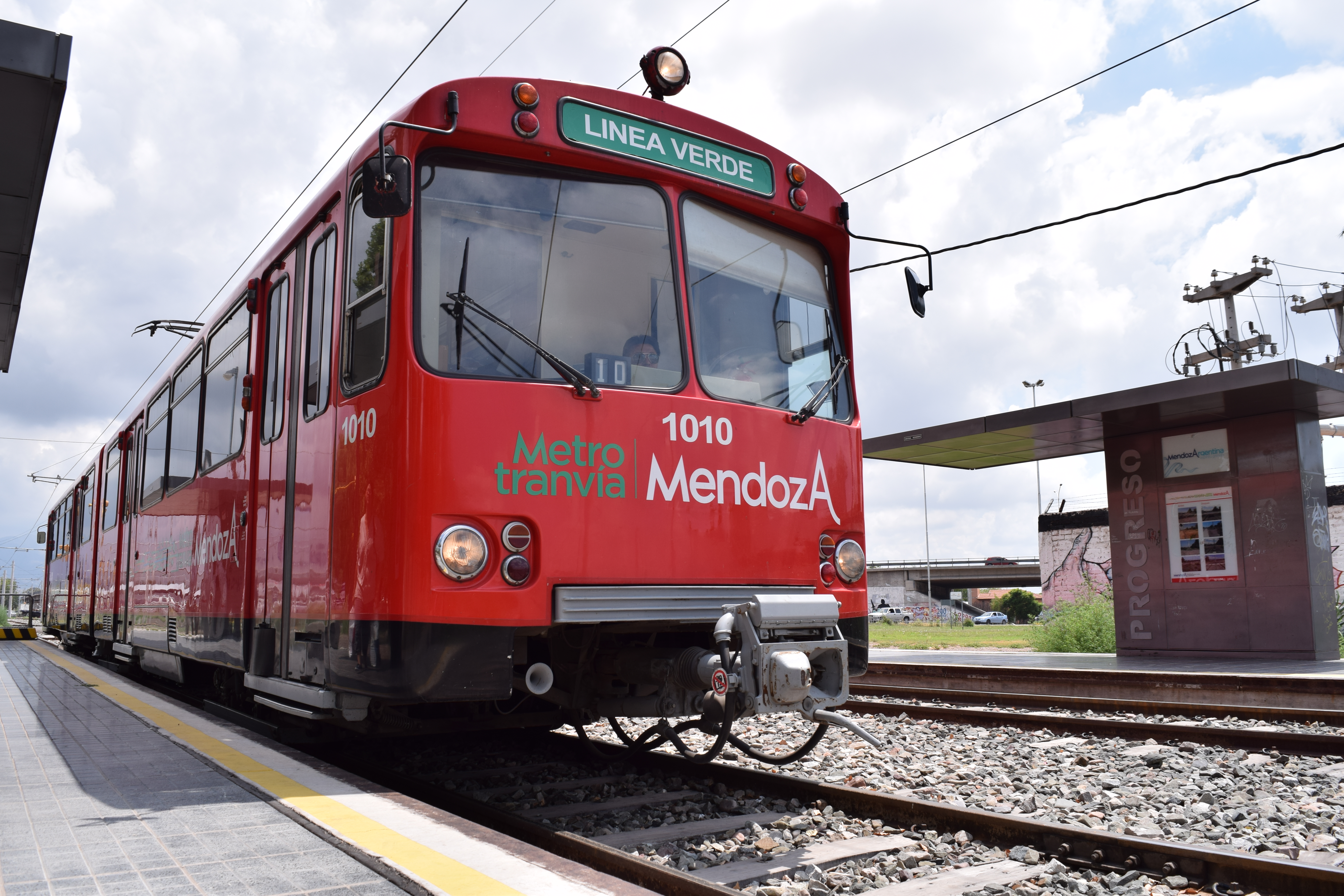

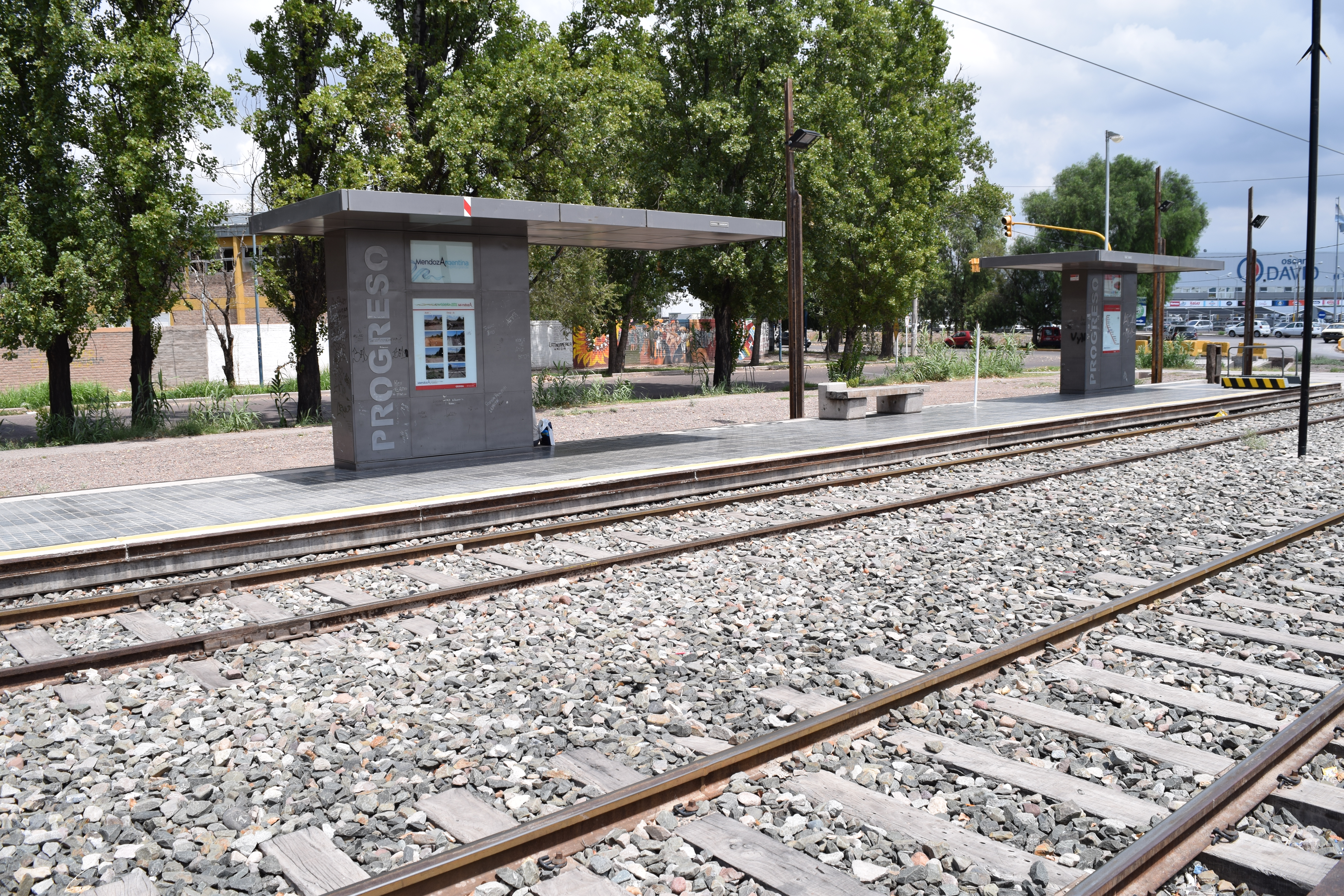

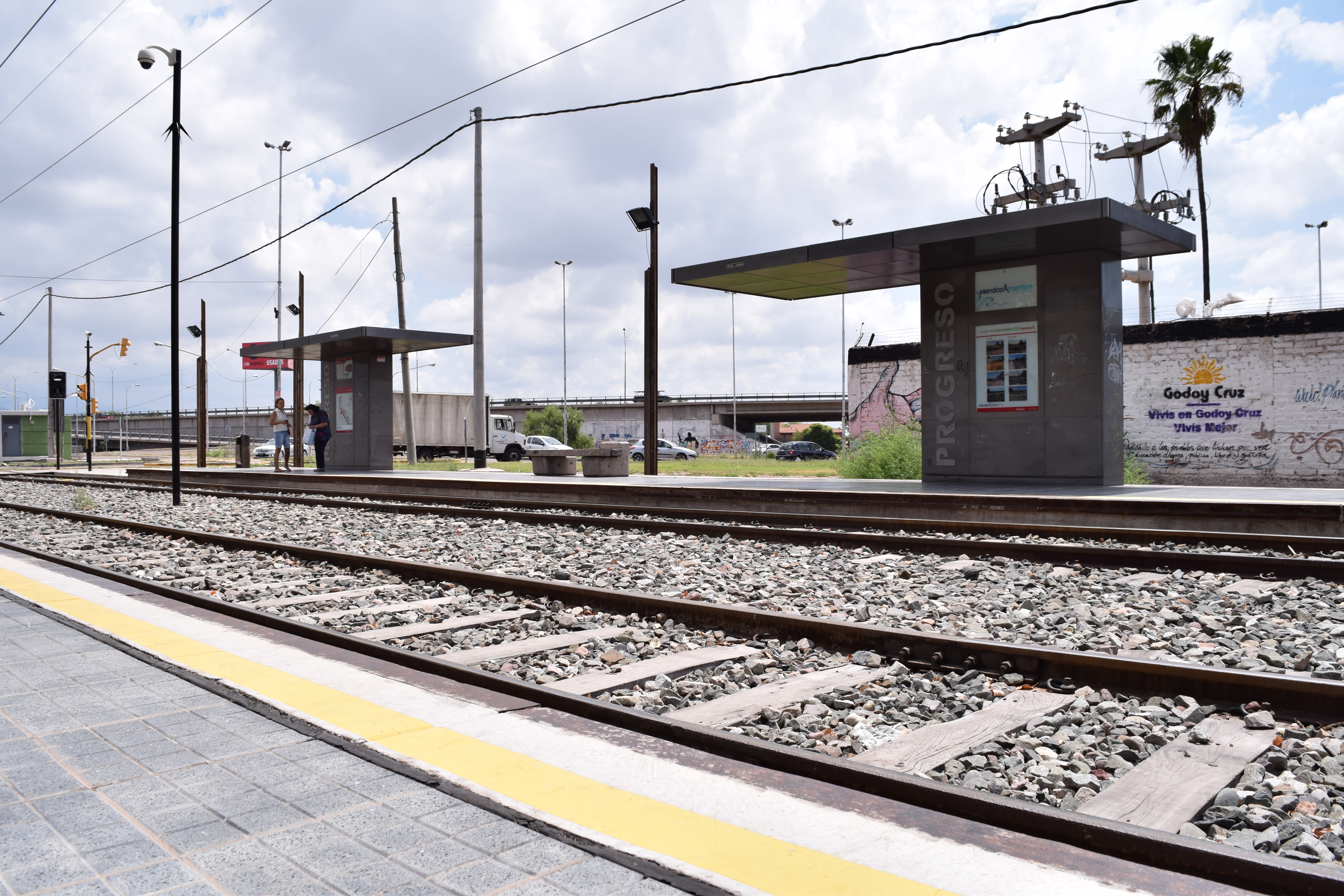
