= Godoy Cruz railway station =

Metrotranvía Mendoza station

Godoy Cruz railway station Estación Godoy Cruz
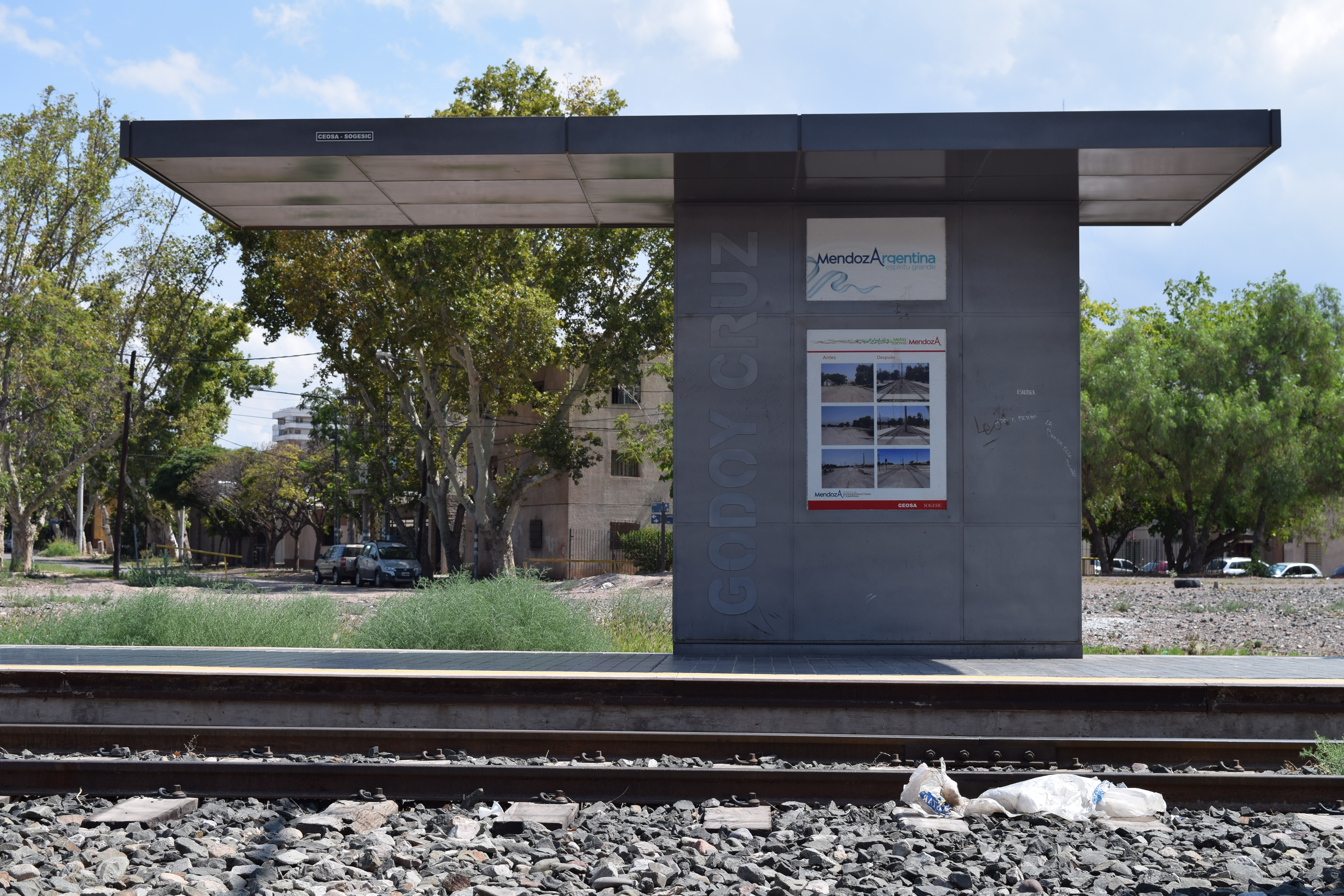

General information
- Location: Godoy Cruz; Argentina
- Coordinates: 32.921494°S 68.839807°W
- Transit authority: Sociedad de Transporte Mendoza
- Platforms: 2 side platforms
- Tracks: 2

History
- Opened: 25 April 1885
- Closed: 1993
- Rebuilt: 28 February 2012
- Previous names: San Vincente
- Original company: Argentine Great Western Railway (former)

Services
Preceding station	STM	Following station
Progreso towards General Gutiérrez	Metrotranvía Mendoza	San Martín towards Avellaneda
Location

Godoy Cruz is a light rail station and former railway station in the city of Godoy Cruz, in the department of the same name in Mendoza Province, Argentina.

== History ==
The San Vicente station (renamed Godoy Cruz in 1902) was already on the schedules of the Argentine Great Western Railway, around 1887. On 1 August 1901, the Argentine Great Western opened a branch from General Gutiérrez to Maipú and Luján de Cuyo, and the following year, given the increase in demand, the San Martín Avenue was raised on a bridge. This was the first of many new local passenger services, including the 1903 es:Circuito Guaymallén, the 1908 Rivadavia-Alto Verde, and the 1912 line from Luján de Cuyo to Mendoza, via Mayor Drummond.

The station was reopened on 28 February 2012, as a station on the new Metrotranvia Mendoza.

== Images ==
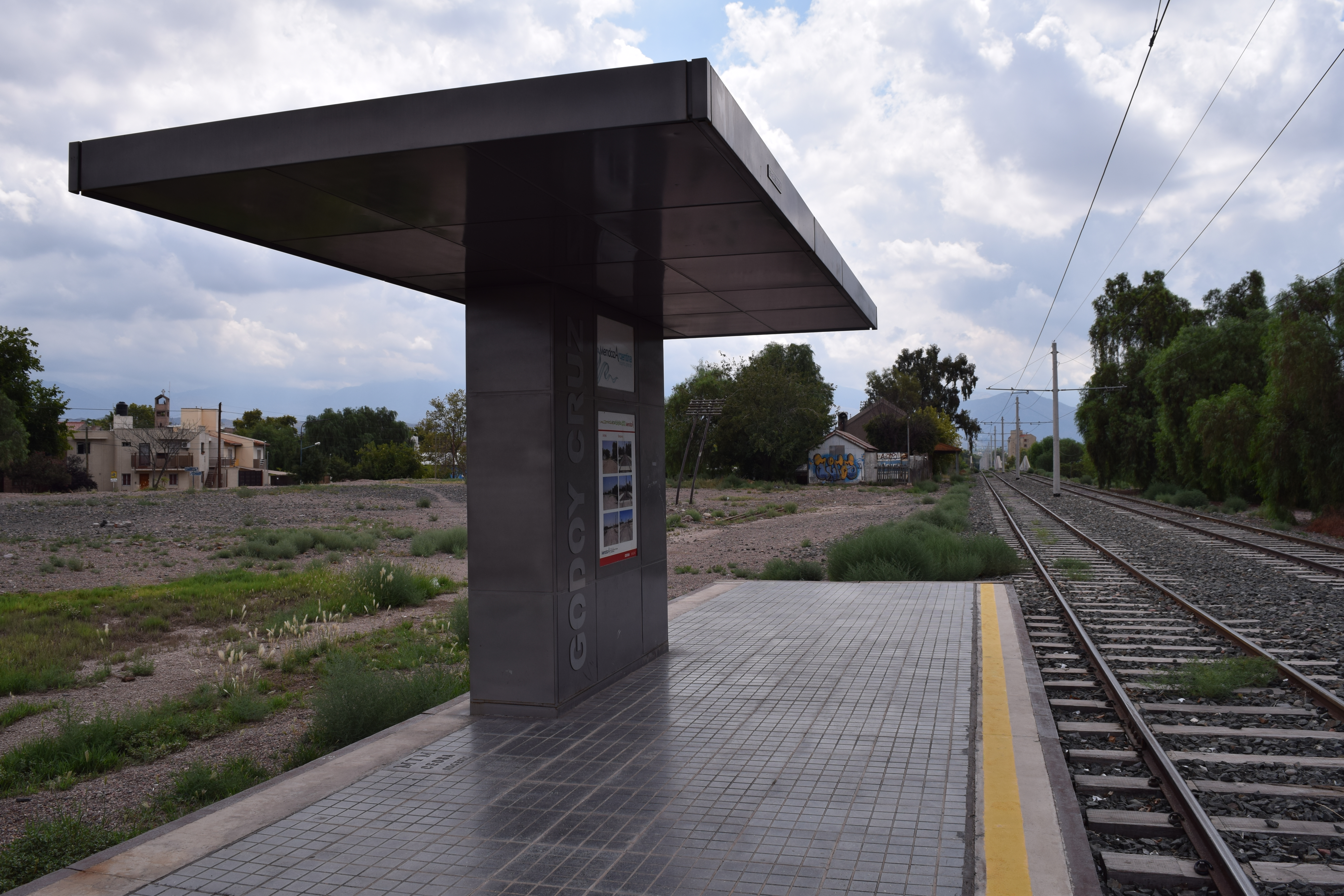

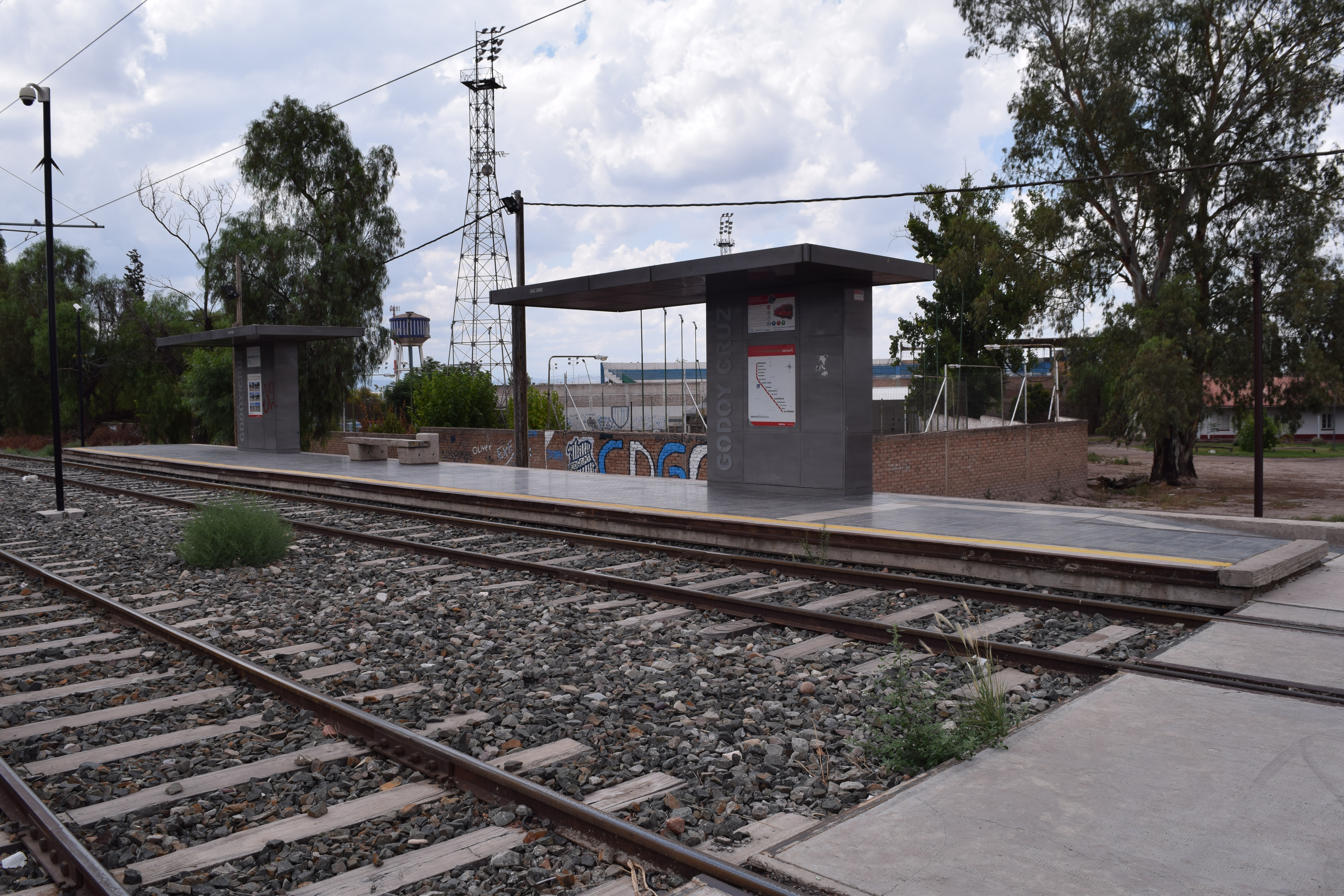

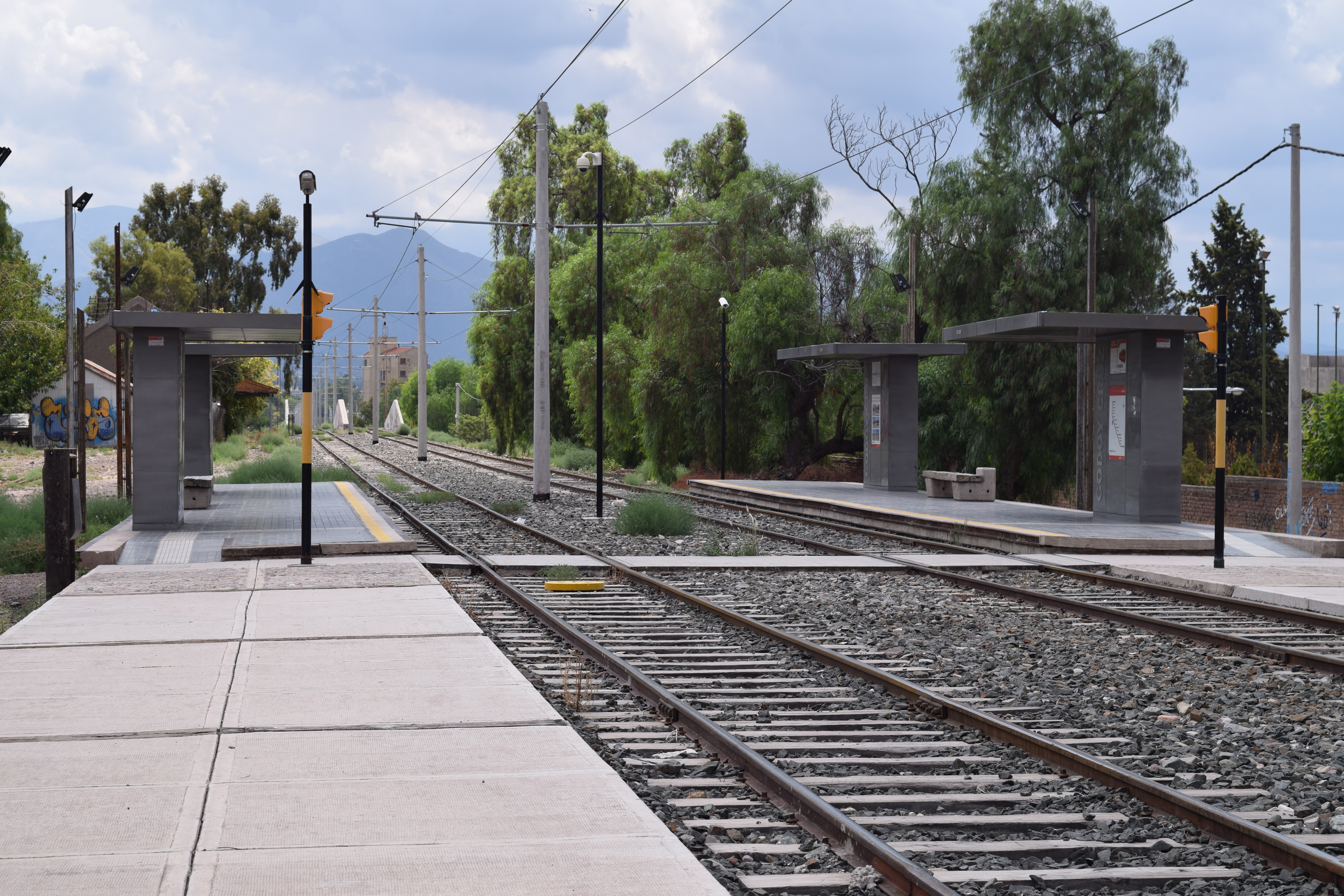

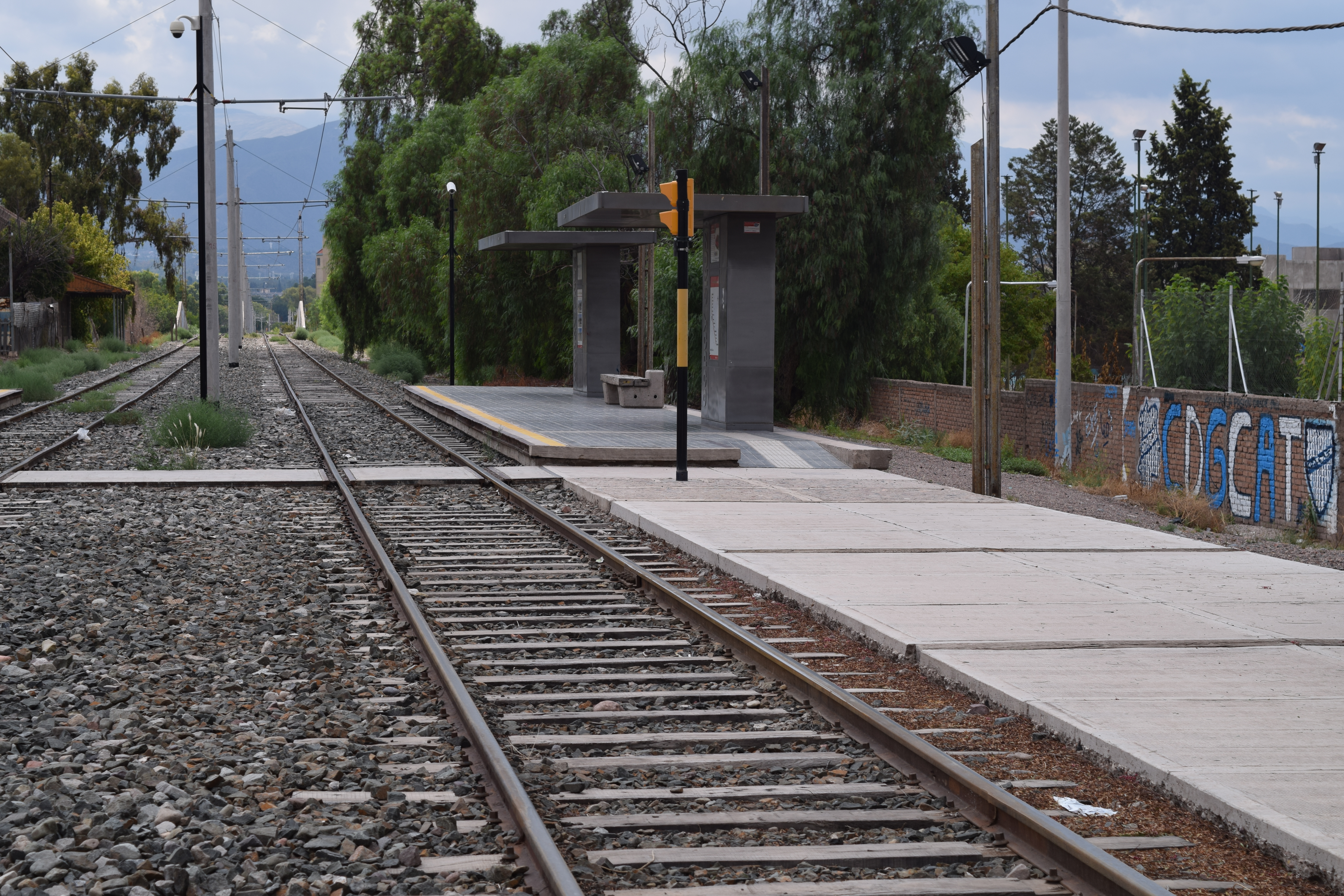
