= Parque TIC station =

Railway station in Argentina

Parque TIC station Parador Parque TIC
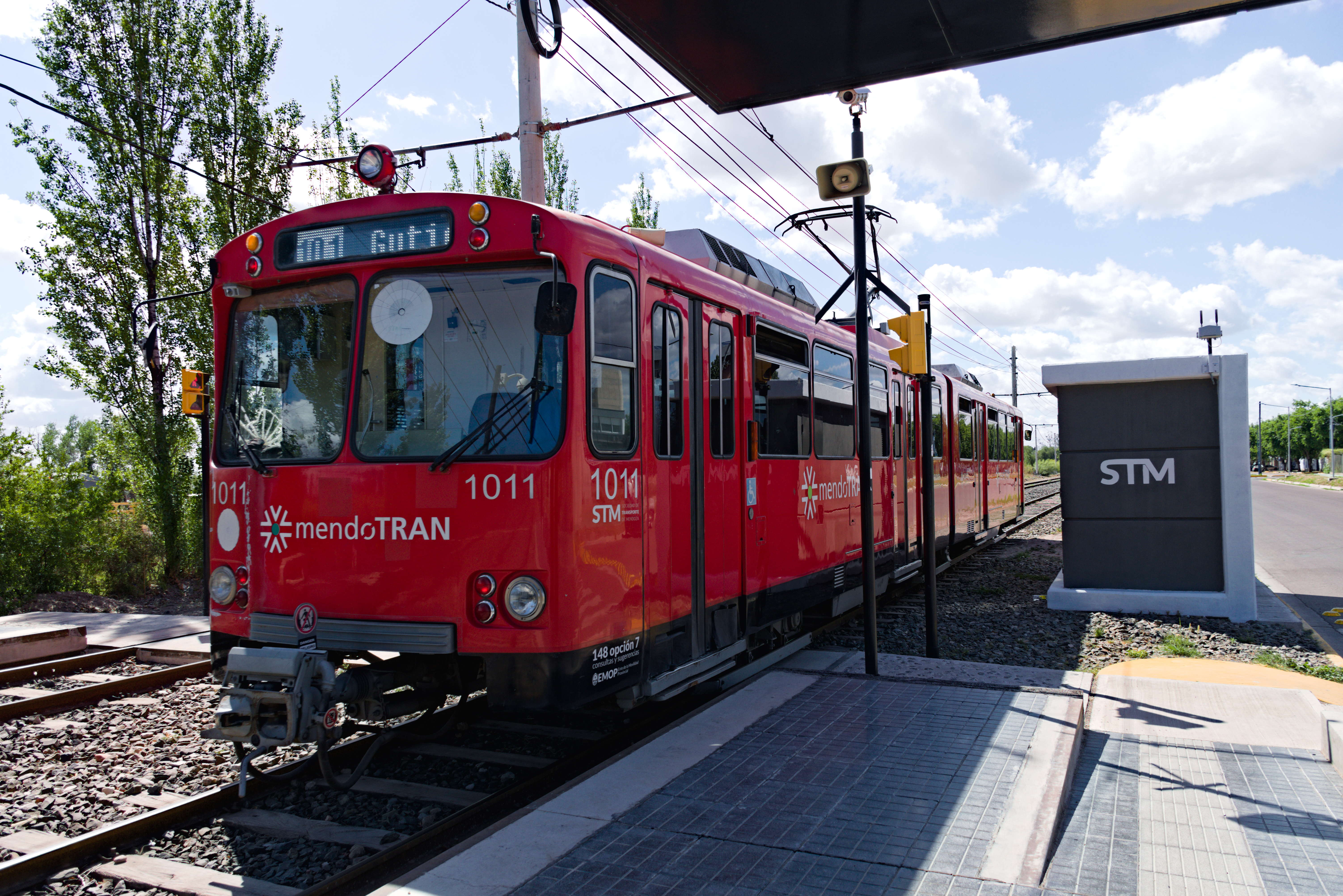

General information
- Location: M5501; Godoy Cruz, Mendoza Province; Argentina
- Coordinates: 32.959652°S 68.782693°W
- Transit authority: Sociedad de Transporte Mendoza
- Platforms: 2 side platforms
- Tracks: 2

History
- Opened: 31 May 2021

Services
Preceding station	STM	Following station
9 de Julio towards General Gutiérrez	Metrotranvía Mendoza	Independencia towards Avellaneda
Location

Parque TIC station (Parador Parque TIC) is a Metrotranvía Mendoza station in Godoy Cruz, Mendoza. It is an infill station that opened on 31 May 2021, to serve the Godoy Cruz ITC Park (Parque TIC de Godoy Cruz).

== Images ==
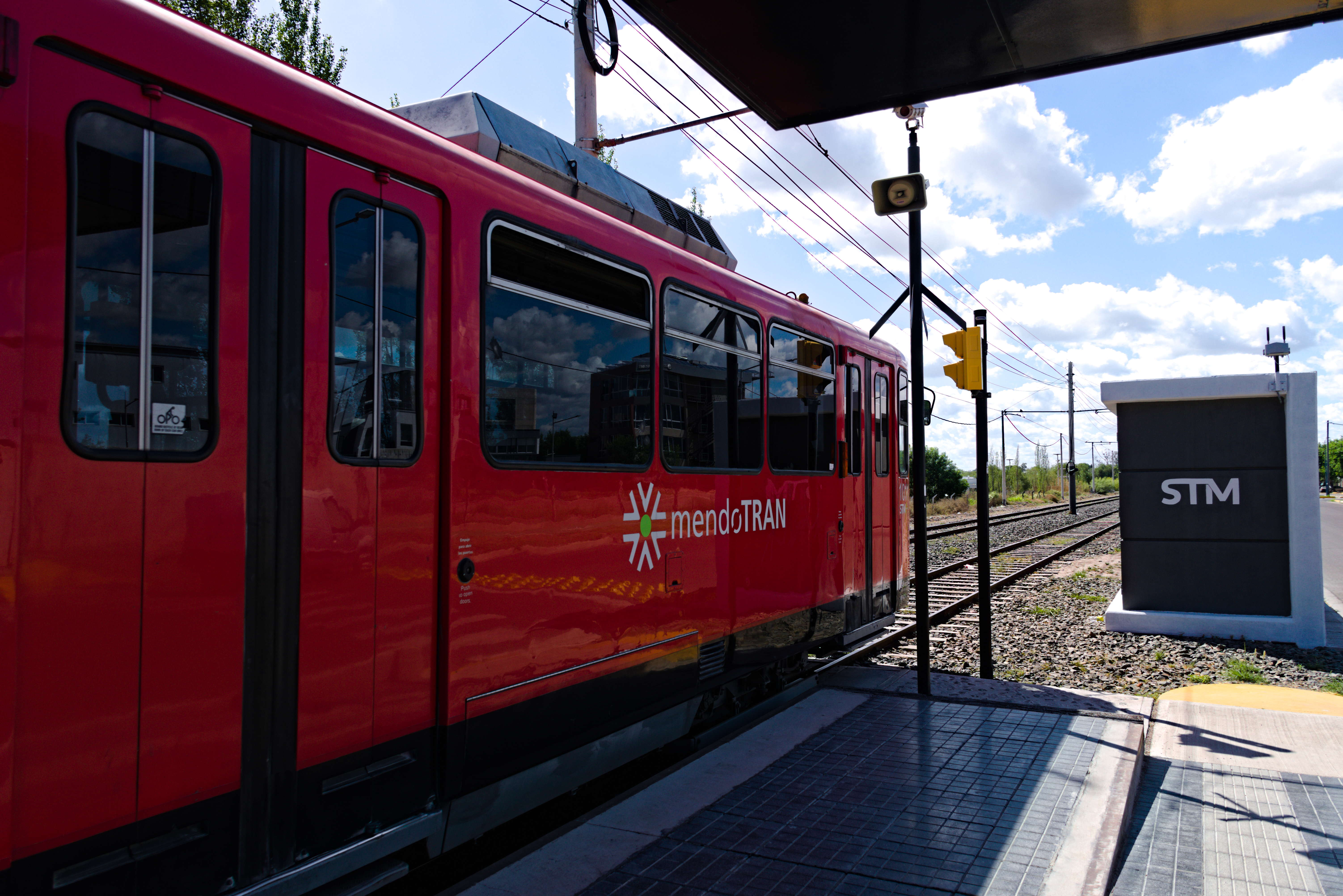

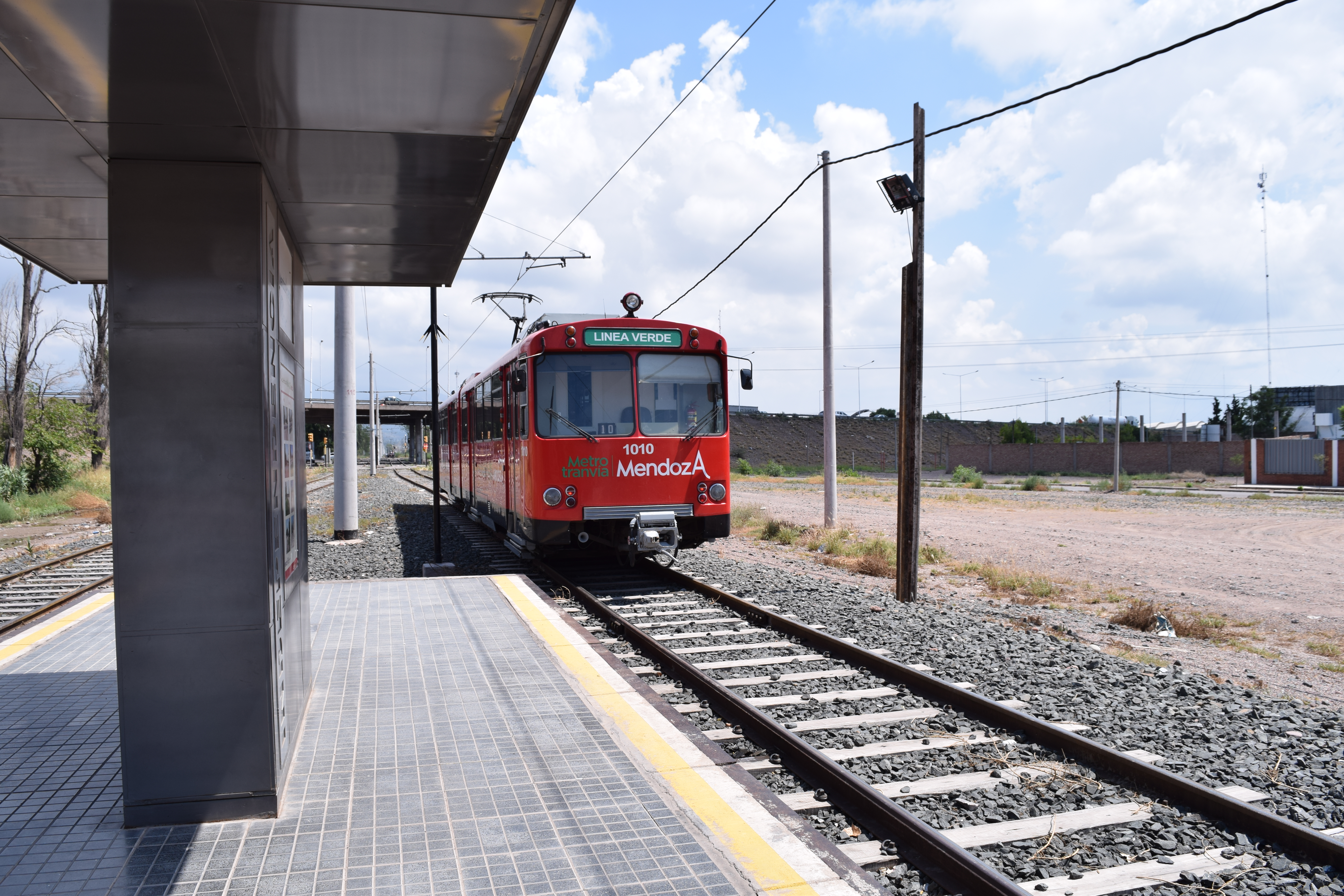

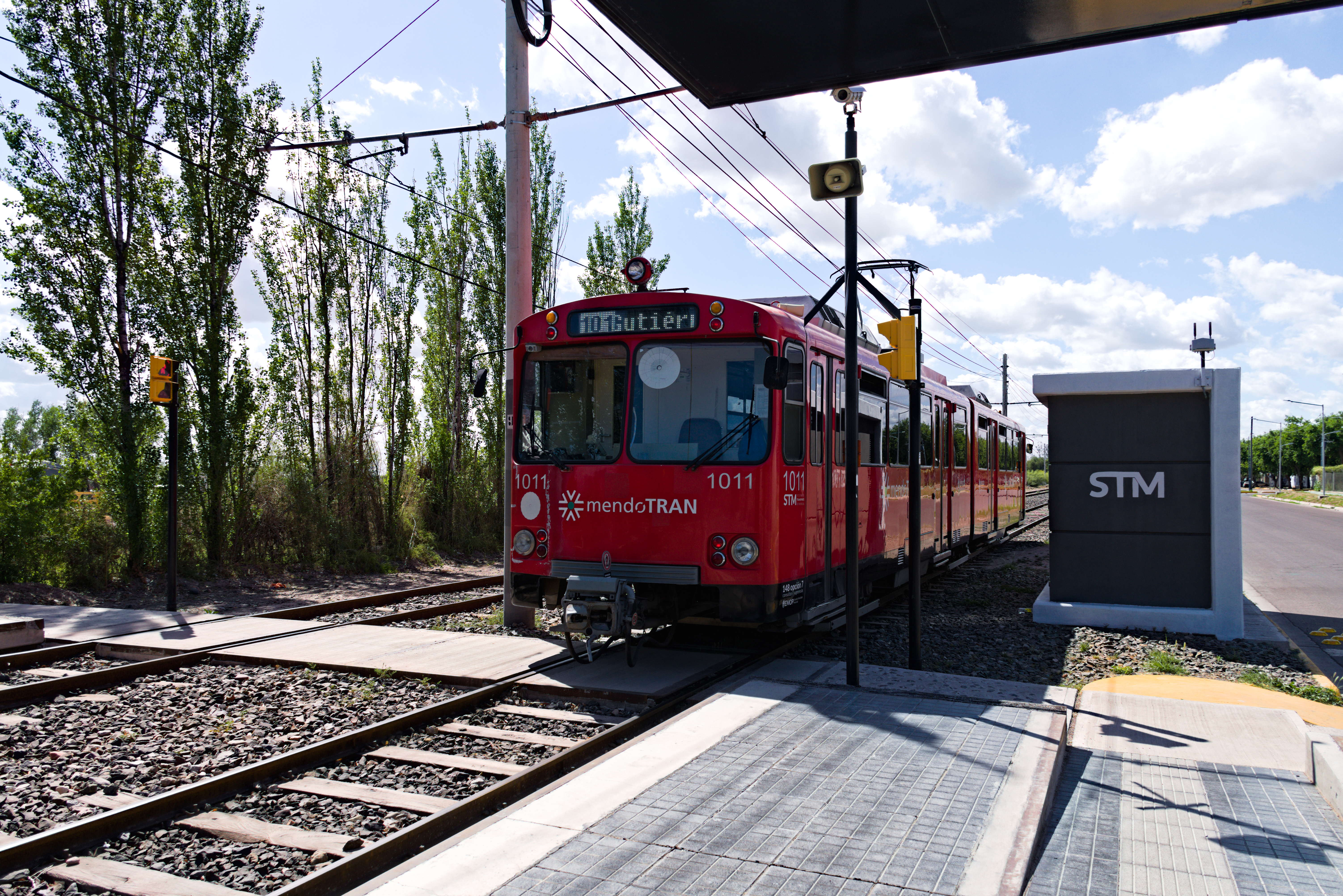

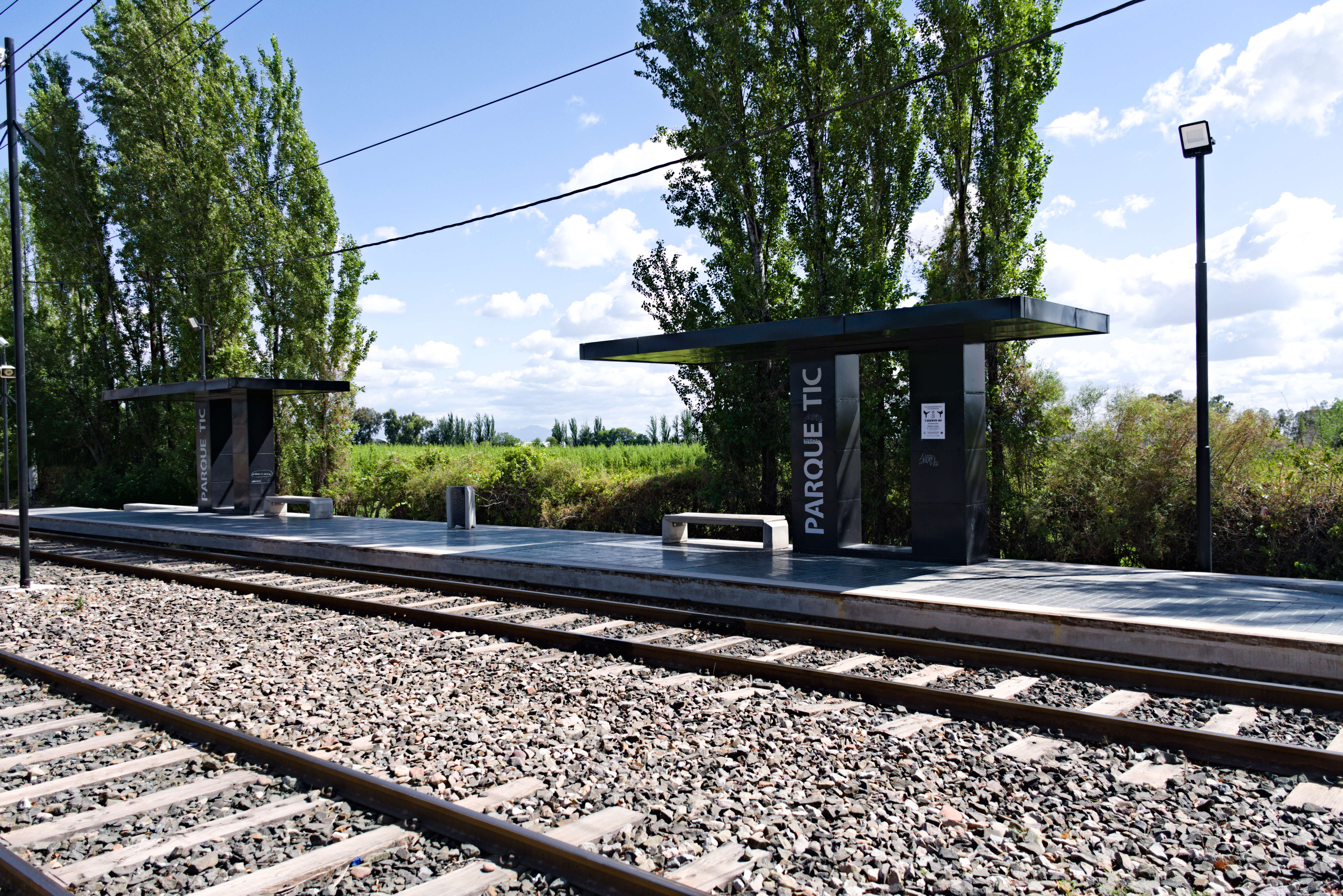

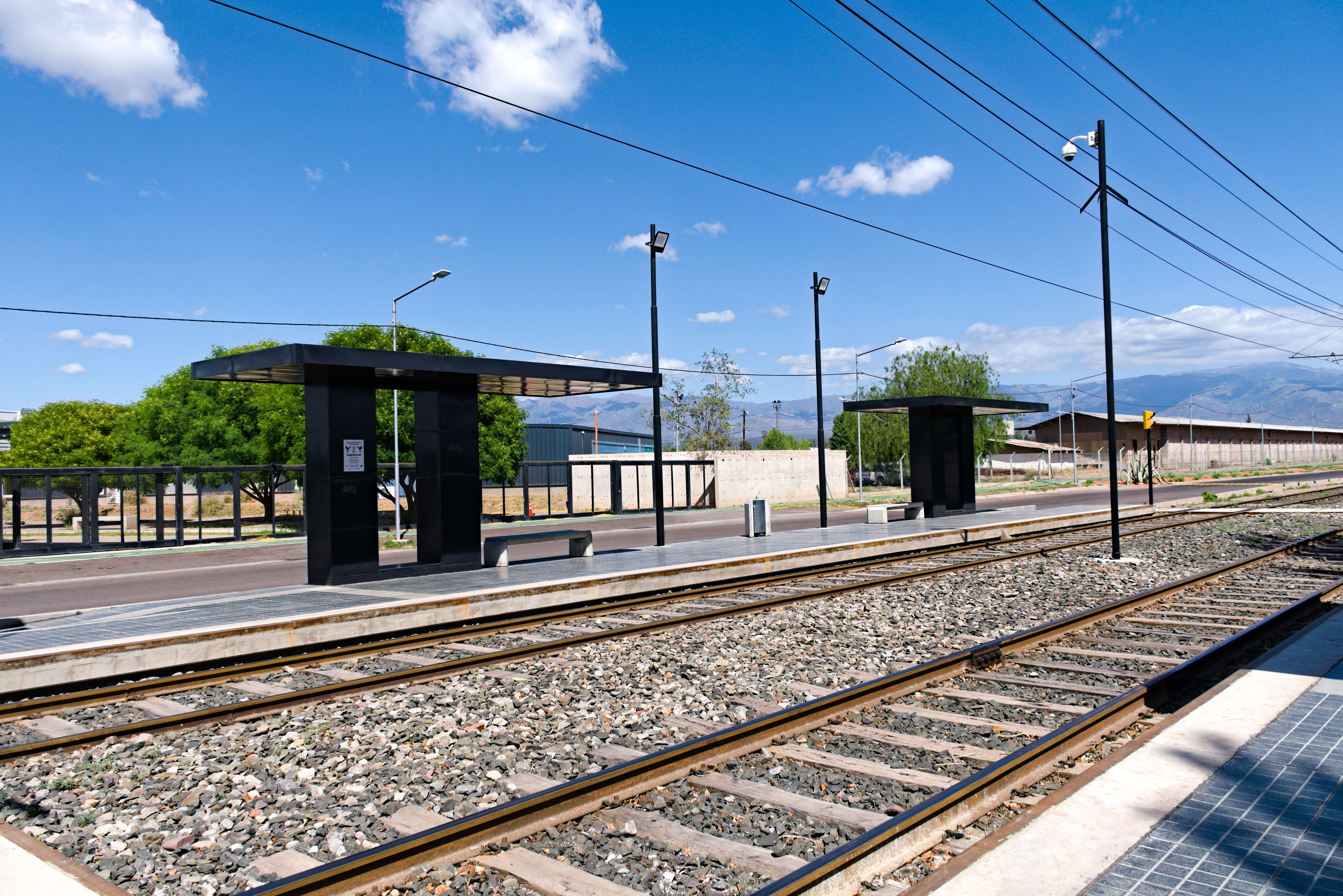
