= History of the Jews in Argentina =

Argentine Jews
Judíos argentinos (Spanish) יהדות ארגנטינה (Hebrew) ייִדן אין אַרגענטינע (Yiddish)
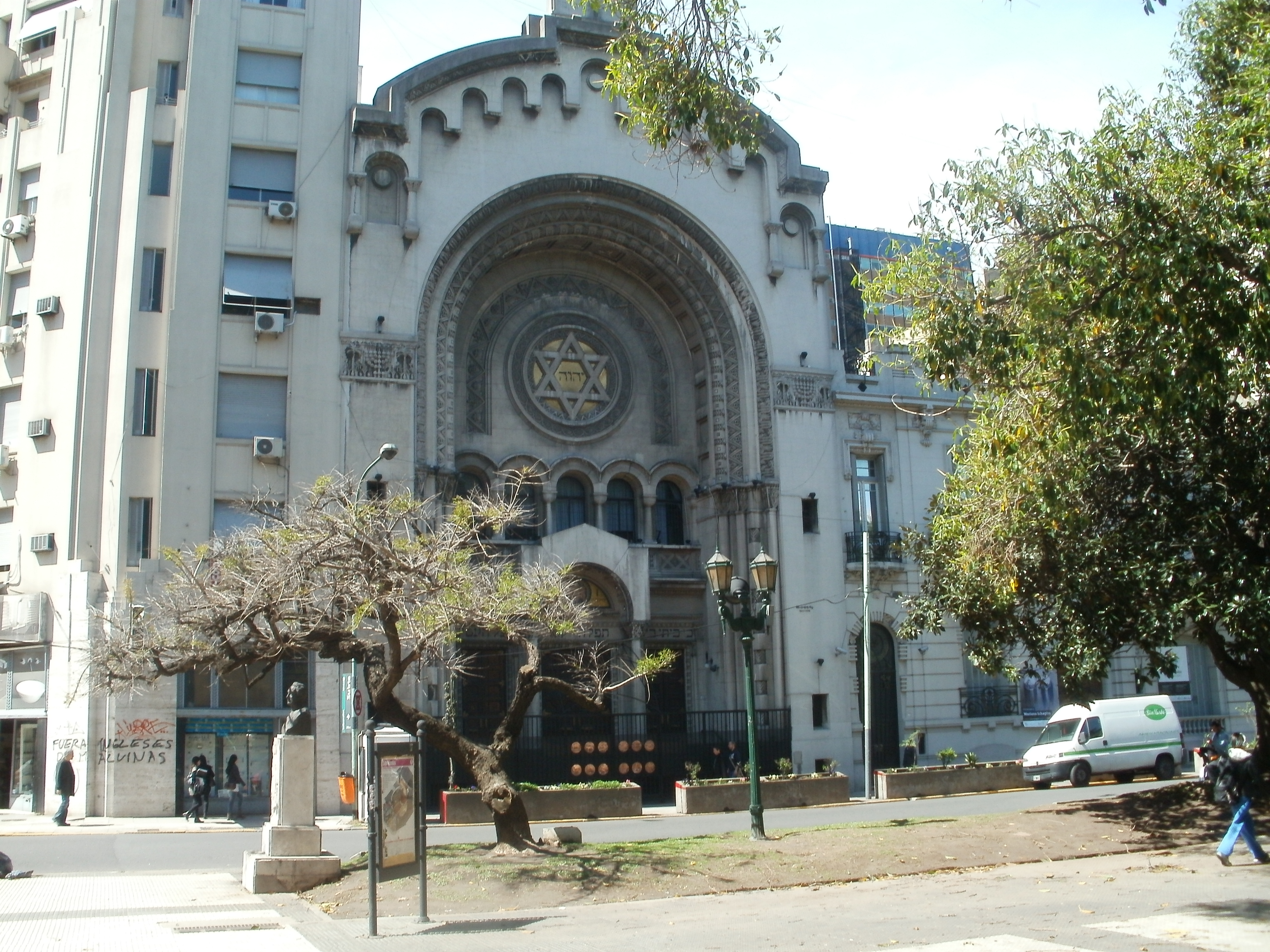
- The Central Synagogue of Buenos Aires.

Total population
- Core Jewish population: 180,500 Enlarged Jewish population (includes non-Jewish relatives of Jews): 330,000 In Israel: 50,000-70,000 In Spain: Several thousand

Regions with significant populations
- Predominantly in Buenos Aires · Buenos Aires Province · Córdoba · Santa Fe · Entre Ríos · Tucumán · Misiones

Languages
- Predominantly Spanish. Some speak Hebrew, Yiddish, Arabic, Judaeo-Spanish, Russian, Polish or German

Religion
- Judaism

The history of the Jews in Argentina goes back to the early sixteenth century, following the expulsion of Jews from Spain. Sephardic Jews fleeing persecution immigrated with explorers and colonists to settle in what is now Argentina, in spite of being forbidden from travelling to the American colonies. In addition, many of the Portuguese traders in the Viceroyalty of the Río de la Plata were Jewish.

An organized Jewish community, however, did not develop until after Argentina gained independence from Spain in 1816. By mid-century, Jews from France and other parts of Western Europe, fleeing the social and economic disruptions of revolutions, began to settle in Argentina. Argentines of both Ashkenazi and Sephardic heritage have left their mark on all aspects of Argentine culture, including in areas such as cuisine.

Reflecting the composition of the later immigration waves, the current Jewish population is 80% Ashkenazi; while Sephardi and Mizrahi are a minority. Argentina has the largest Jewish population of any country in Latin America, although numerous Jews left during the 1970s and 1980s to escape the repression of the military junta. They emigrated to Israel, West Europe (especially Spain), and North America.

The community numbered about 400,000 after World War II, but the appeal of Israel and economic and cultural pressures at home led many to leave. Instability in Israel in the early 21st century has resulted in a modest reversal of the trend since 2003. During a major emigration wave in the 2000s, more than 10,000 Argentine Jews settled in Israel.

== History ==
=== Early years ===
Some Spanish conversos, or secret Jews, settled in Argentina during the Spanish colonial period (16th–19th century), had assimilated into the Argentine population. After Argentina gained independence, the General Assembly of 1813 officially abolished the Inquisition.

The second wave of Jewish immigration from Europe began in the mid-19th century, during revolutions and extensive social disruption. Much of the Great European immigration wave to Argentina came from Western Europe, especially Spain and Italy.

Argentine Jewish women played a vital role in their communities, supporting charities, synagogues, and libraries while also organizing community events such as weddings. In 1860, the first Jewish wedding was recorded in Buenos Aires. A minyan was organized for High Holiday services a few years later, leading to the establishment of the Congregación Israelita de la República.

=== Agricultural settlement ===
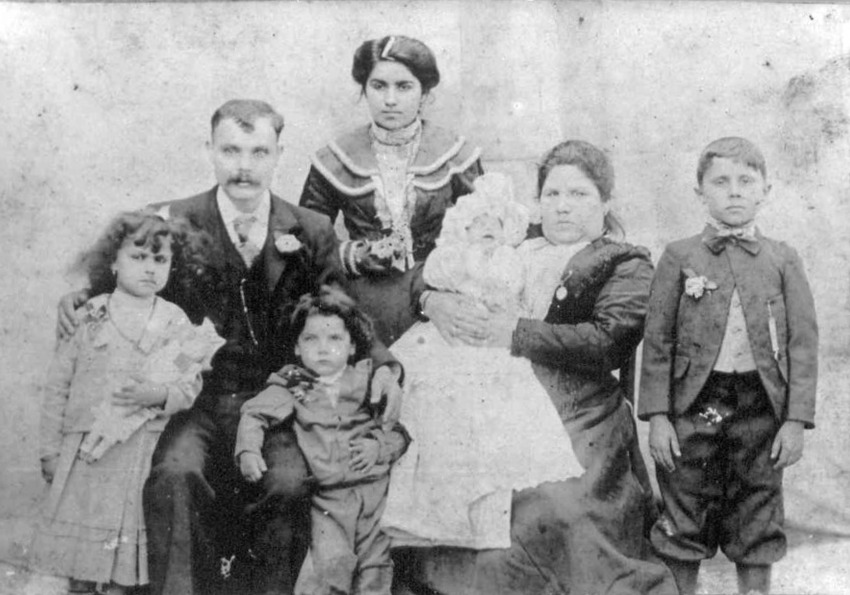
Sephardic Jew family from the Misiones Province, circa 1900.

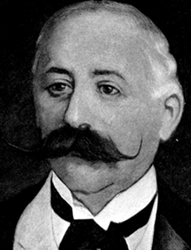
Baron Maurice de Hirsch (1831–1896).

In the late 19th century, Ashkenazi immigrants fleeing poverty and pogroms in Russia and Eastern Europe settled in Argentina, attracted by its open-door immigration policy. These Jews became known as rusos ("Russians").

In 1889, a group of 824 Russian Jews arrived in Argentina on the S.S. Weser and became gauchos (Argentine cowboys). They bought land and established a colony named Moisesville.

In dire economic straits, they appealed to the German Jewish philanthropist Baron Maurice de Hirsch, who founded the Jewish Colonization Association which helped manage the various colonies. In its heyday, the Association owned more than 600,000 hectares of land. Between 1906 and 1912, some 13,000 Jews immigrated to Argentina every year, mostly from Europe, but also from Morocco and the Ottoman Empire. By 1920, more than 150,000 Jews were living in Argentina.

After the death of his son and heir, de Hirsch devoted himself to Jewish philanthropy and alleviating Jewish suffering in Eastern Europe. He developed a plan to bring Jews to Argentina as autonomous agricultural settlers. This meshed with Argentina's campaign to attract immigrants.

The 1853 constitution guaranteed religious freedom, and the country had vast, unpopulated land reserves. Under President Julio Argentino Roca, a policy of mass immigration was encouraged; it provided relief to refugees fleeing the violent pogroms in the Russian Empire from 1881 onwards.

Jewish agricultural settlements were established in the provinces of Buenos Aires (Lapin, Rivera), Entre Ríos (San Gregorio, Villa Domínguez, Carmel, Ingeniero Sajaroff, Villa Clara, and Villaguay), and Santa Fe (Moisés Ville). The national census of 1895 recorded that, of the 6,085 people who identified as Jewish, 3,880 (about 64%) lived in Entre Ríos.

Despite antisemitism and increasing xenophobia, Jews became involved in most sectors of Argentine society. Many settled in cities, especially Buenos Aires. As they were prohibited from positions in the government or military, many became farmers, peddlers, artisans, and shopkeepers.

Jewish women in Argentina were essential in sustaining farmland and raising children who would continue this work. Eastern European and German Jewish women had many responsibilities on the farm, with mothers and daughters working together to complete tasks in the field.

They shared the physically demanding burden of farm life, preparing the fields for harvest and helping in the eventual yield of crops. They were also responsible for taking care of animals, preparing food, and performing other household tasks such as cleaning and laundry.

Young Jewish women from Eastern Europe were also forced into sex work by the Zwi Migdal, an organized crime group run by Jews in Poland in the 19th century, based mainly in Buenos Aires.

=== 20th century ===
==== World War II and antisemitism ====
Argentina kept its doors open to Jewish immigration until 1938, when Adolf Hitler and the Nazis in Germany began to take more actions against Jews, and tensions rose across Europe in preparation for war.

The government imposed new regulations on immigration; it was severely curtailed at a time of increasing persecution of Jews and the outbreak of World War II, when Jews sought a safe haven from the Nazis. Among the refugees who found exile in Argentina were numerous musicians.

Although warned on several occasions by the German authorities to repatriate its Jewish citizens, the Argentine government refused to repatriate its approximately 100 nationals living in German-occupied Europe before the country severed diplomatic relations with Nazi Germany under Allied pressure in January 1944. All are believed to have been exterminated.

Juan Domingo Perón's rise to power in 1946 in Argentina after the war worried many Jews in the country. As Minister of War, he had signed Argentina's declaration of war against the Axis powers, but as a nationalist, he had earlier expressed sympathy for them. He was known to admire the Italian Fascist leader, Benito Mussolini.

Perón introduced Catholic religious instruction in Argentine public schools; he allowed Nazis fleeing prosecution in Germany to immigrate to the country. Perón also expressed sympathy for Jewish rights and in 1949 established diplomatic relations with Israel. Perón's government was the first in Argentina to allow Jewish citizens to hold office.

Among the most notable Nazis who immigrated to Argentina was Adolf Eichmann, a high-ranking official who had supervised the death camps; he lived near Buenos Aires from after World War II until 1960. Israeli agents tracked him down and abducted him from a Buenos Aires suburb to Israel for trial for war crimes. Eichmann faced trial in Jerusalem beginning in April 1961; he was convicted of crimes against humanity and hanged in May 1962.

Perón was overthrown in 1955, with the unrest unleashing a wave of antisemitism. Since then, more than 45,000 Jews have migrated to Israel from Argentina. Others have migrated to Europe and other destinations.

In the 1950s and 1960s, the Tacuara Nationalist Movement, a fascist organization with political ties, began a series of antisemitic campaigns. They encouraged street fights against Jews, and vandalism of synagogues and Jewish cemeteries.

A poll in 1964 shows that 26 percent of Argentine citizens and 76 percent of the Argentine military would bar Jewish immigrants' entry into Argentine.

==== Junta rule ====
Between 1976 and 1983, Argentina was ruled by a military junta that oppressed many and "disappeared" countless victims. During this period, Jews were a prime target of the military government, in part because many opposed this dictature but also due to the Nazi ideology which permeated the ranks of the military, with some generals being obsessed with the "Jewish question".

Some sections of the military government believed in the "Andinia Plan", a fictional Israeli conspiracy to take over part of the Patagonia region and establish a second Jewish state there. Some Jewish prisoners were even interrogated over their knowledge of Andinia Plan and were even asked to provide details of Israeli military preparations for an invasion of southern Argentina.

During the period of military rule, people who opposed the government were arrested, imprisoned, and often "disappeared", being subjected to torture and execution, and Jewish victims were singled out for especially harsh treatment. The number of Jewish victims may have been as high as 3,000. Despite being less than 1% of the population, Jews made up around 12% of the victims of the military regime.

One Jew, Jacobo Timerman, a journalist who extensively covered government atrocities during the Dirty War, became the single most famous political prisoner of the entire Dirty War following his arrest and imprisonment. Timerman was eventually released, largely as a result of US and Israeli diplomatic pressure, and was expelled from Argentina. He lived in Israel until the junta fell.

Israel had a special agreement with the Argentine military government to allow Jews arrested for political crimes to immigrate to Israel, citing an Argentine law that allowed Argentine citizens in prison to emigrate if another country was willing to take them in. Israeli diplomats in Argentina helped organize the emigration of Jewish dissidents who had been arrested. This included leftist activists whose arrests had had nothing to do with their Jewish origins.

As well as official Israeli government efforts to secure the release and emigration of imprisoned Jews, many Israeli embassy personnel also took extensive independent efforts to rescue Jewish prisoners.

The number of Argentine Jews emigrating to Israel greatly increased throughout the period of the junta. Some Jews also emigrated to Spain, other European countries and the United States. American-Jewish organizations began preparing for a mass exodus of Argentine Jewry.

The Hebrew Immigrant Aid Society secured a promise from the government of Brazil to provide temporary asylum for the 350,000 Jews of Argentina if it became necessary, and in 1976, the US State Department promised Rabbi Alexander Schindler of the Union of American Hebrew Congregations that it would issue 100,000 visas for Argentine-Jewish refugees if it became necessary.

During the 1982 Falklands War, around 250 Jewish soldiers served in the Falkland Islands and strategic points in Patagonia. During their service, they suffered antisemitic attacks by officers. The Argentine government allowed five rabbis to visit them: these were the only chaplains permitted to accompany the Argentine Army during the conflict and were the only non-Catholic chaplains ever permitted to serve.

According to the author Hernán Dobry, rabbis were permitted to visit Jewish soldiers because Argentina had been buying arms from Israel, and did not want to risk the relationship "for the sake of five rabbis".

==== Return to democracy and the terrorist attacks ====
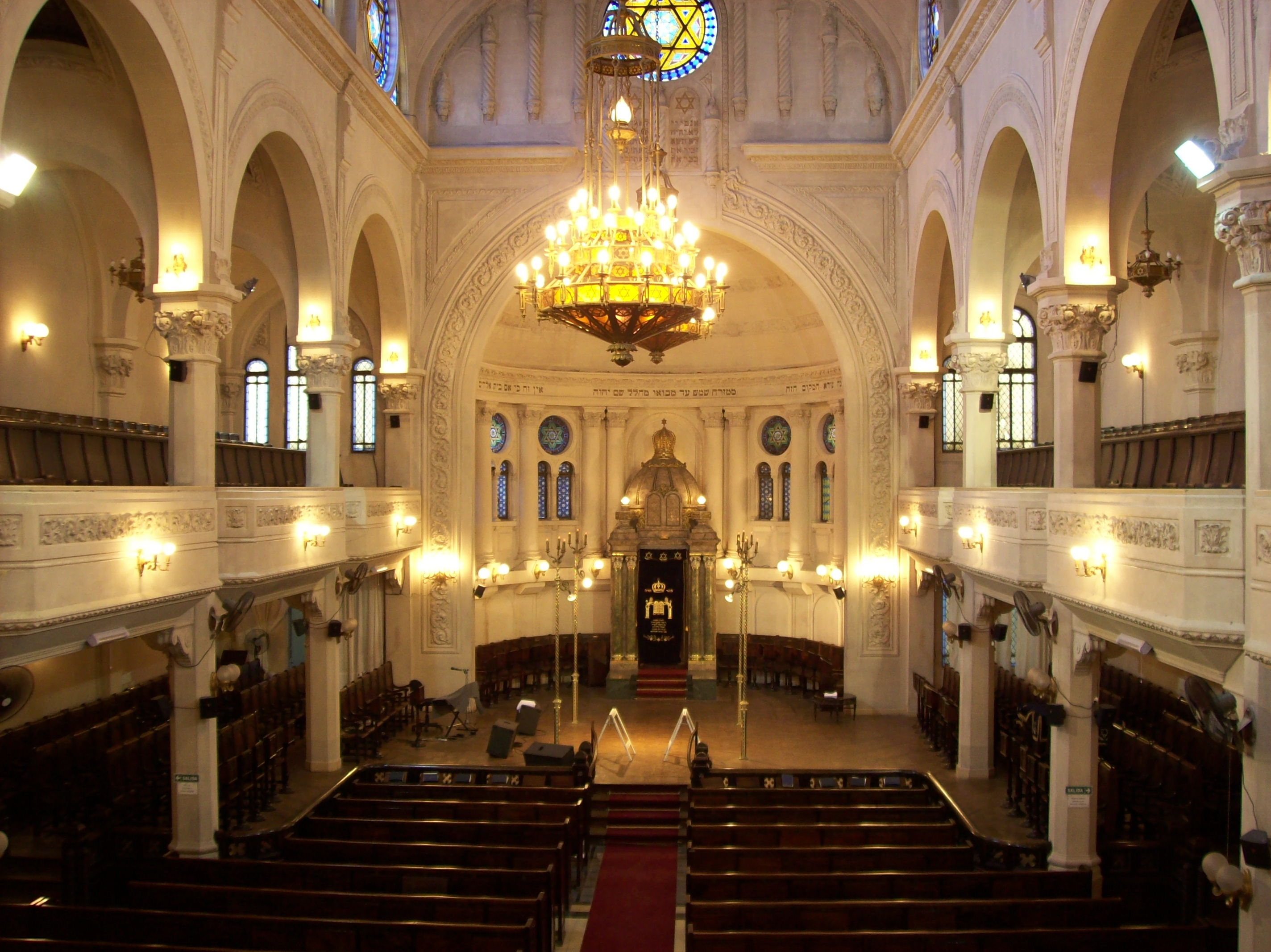
Interior of the Gran Templo Paso synagogue, Buenos Aires

In 1983, Raúl Alfonsín was democratically elected as president of Argentina. He enjoyed the support of the Jewish population and appointed many Jews in high positions.

When Carlos Saul Menem, who was of Syrian descent, was elected president in 1989, his Arab background and previous support of Perón worried the Jews, but he proved to be a more tolerant leader. Menem appointed many Jews to his government, visited Israel a number of times, and offered to help mediate the Israeli-Arab peace process.

After a Jewish cemetery was desecrated in Buenos Aires, Menem immediately expressed his outrage to the Jewish community. Within a week, his government had apprehended those responsible.

President Menem also ordered the release of files relating to Argentina's role in serving as a haven for Nazi war criminals. In 1988, the Argentine parliament passed a law against racism and antisemitism.

In the 1990s, two major terrorist attacks in Argentina killed and wounded numerous Jews. Neither has been solved. In March 1992, the Israeli Embassy was bombed, killing 29 people. This likely reflected international tensions between Israel and Arabs, including Palestinians.

In July 1994, the Jewish community center (AMIA) in Buenos Aires was bombed, killing 85 people and wounding more than 200. The community's archives were partially destroyed in the bombing. In 2005, an Argentine prosecutor said the AMIA bombing was carried out by a 21-year-old Lebanese suicide bomber who belonged to Hezbollah.

In 2006, Argentine Justice indicted seven high-ranking former Iranian officials and one senior Hezbollah member, charged with participating in the planning and execution of the AMIA bombing. In 2007, Interpol ordered a red notice to capture the Iranian fugitives. Since then, the Argentine government has requested that Iran extradite the Iranian citizens accused for the attack in order to be judged by an Argentine or a foreign court, but Iran has refused.

In response to the deadly attack, Miguel Ángel Pichetto, then Senator from the Peronist Front for Victory (FpV) and later running mate of Mauricio Macri in the 2019 presidential election, said that "real Argentines and Jewish Argentines" were killed, a saying reflecting the attitude towards Jews in the country in those days.

=== 21st century ===
During the economic crisis of 1999–2002, approximately 4,400 Argentine Jews made aliyah to Israel. Following the 2003 economic recovery and subsequent growth, Argentine immigration to Israel leveled off, and some who had left for Israel returned to Argentina. Altogether, some 10,000 Argentine Jews immigrated to Israel during the 2000s. Due to the economic situation, several Jewish institutes such as schools, community centers, clubs and congregations merged.

In February 2009, Argentina expelled Richard Williamson, an excommunicated traditionalist Roman Catholic bishop. Williamson, who headed a seminary near Buenos Aires, was ordered to leave for 'concealing true activity' (he had entered the country as an employee of a non-governmental group, not a priest). The decision also cited his denial of the Holocaust.

A 2011 poll conducted by the Gino Germani Research Institute of the University of Buenos Aires on behalf of the Anti-Defamation League and Delegación de Asociaciones Israelitas Argentinas showed that a majority of Argentines held antisemitic sentiments or prejudices. Of the 1,510 Argentines surveyed, 82% agreed with statements "that Jews are preoccupied with making money," 49% said that they "talk too much about what happened to them in the Holocaust", 68% said that they have "too much power in the business world", and 22% said that the Jews killed Jesus. The majority of people interviewed also expressed the belief that Jews are more loyal to Israel than their country of birth.

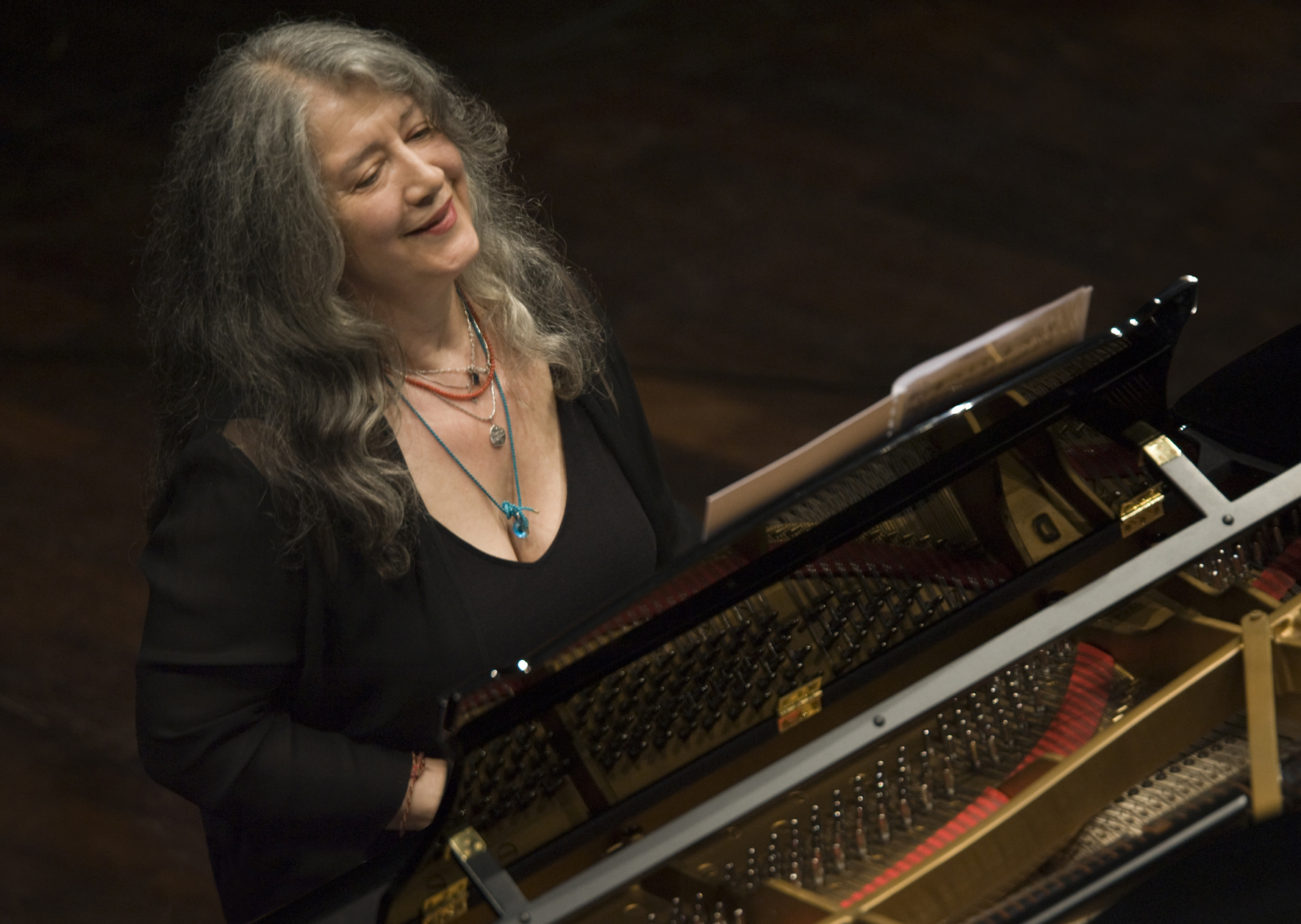
Pianist Martha Argerich

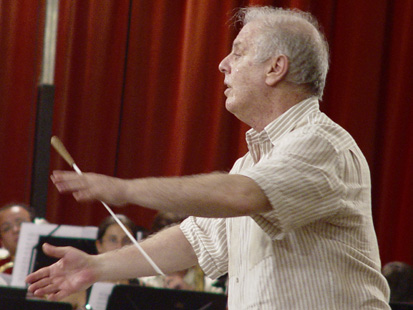
Conductor Daniel Barenboim

In recent years there was number of antisemitic incidents in Argentina: on 19 October 2012, a discriminatory and antisemitic message, which included Nazi references, was painted on the front of a public school in Concordia, Entre Rios.

Another incident took place in Mendoza on 6 September 2012 when during a basketball game the father of the player Andres Berman was physically assaulted after he criticized antisemitic statements by fans of an opposing team.

In 2013 there was number of antisemitic incidents throughout Argentina, most of them were verbal assaults on Jews and vandalism.

- On 17 April 2013, a Nazi hate symbol and the message "I sell soap made of Jews" were found painted on a house in San Juan.
- On 25 July 2013, two more Nazi symbols were painted on the front of the Beith Iacov synagogue in the town of Villa Clara, and on 29 July 2013 more such symbols were found painted in the Republic of the Children Park in La Plata.
- On 1 August, a freshman student in the English college Colegio San Bartolomé was castigated for writing on the board in the classroom "Fewer Jews, more soap" (Menos judíos, más jabones).
- On 9 August 2013, the words "Fuck Jewish" were found spray painted on the Temple Libertad synagogue in Buenos Aires, and on 17 August 2013 Nazi symbols were found painted on monuments, walls and private homes in Maipú.
- On 10 November, an ultra-Catholic group wanted to prevent a Jewish-Christian ceremony commemorating the Kristallnacht at a Buenos Aires cathedral. In the end, the demonstrators left upon the request of Father Fernando Gianetti and the ceremony continued without interruption.

In July 2014 there were at least two cases of antisemitic graffiti: In Mendoza, where Nazi symbols had been painted on the front of the local Jewish Cultural Center, and in Buenos Aires during a pro-Palestinian rally. Another racist incident occurred in Cordoba, where two flags, Israel's and the United States's, were covered with Nazi symbols and were placed in the city's central square

Later that month the newspaper "La Plata" published a caricature presenting a stereotype Jewish old man speaking out against Israel's actions during Operation Protective Edge, with distortion of the actual reality in Israel. Two antisemitic graffiti, including the words "Jews out" were found in the country during October.

Three more antisemitic graffiti were found in Buenos Aires and Córdoba during November. One of the graffiti was "Be a patriot, kill a Jew", and another had a Nazi symbol sprayed on the passage leading to the house of the Córdoba rabbi. On December there was also an antisemitic graffiti incident at the headquarters of the Labor Party.

In January 2015, ten Israeli tourists were wounded in an antisemitic attack at a hostel in a small village of Chubut Province. In the next month, antisemitic posters were found in a Jewish neighborhood in Buenos Aires. On the beginning of March a Jewish center and a cemetery was desecrated with antisemitic graffiti in Rosario.

Two more incidents of antisemitic graffiti occurred on August in Buenos Aires and Sauce Viejo. Towards the end of the year, a young Jewish man was violently attacked by a student in the private University of San Andrés who also shouted "long live the Holocaust".

In April 2016 it was announced that Jewish community center and Temple NCI-Emanu El, which serves both Conservative and Reform branches, unanimously agreed to hold a same-sex wedding at the site, the first official same-sex Jewish wedding at a religious setting in Latin America.

== Buenos Aires Jewish community ==
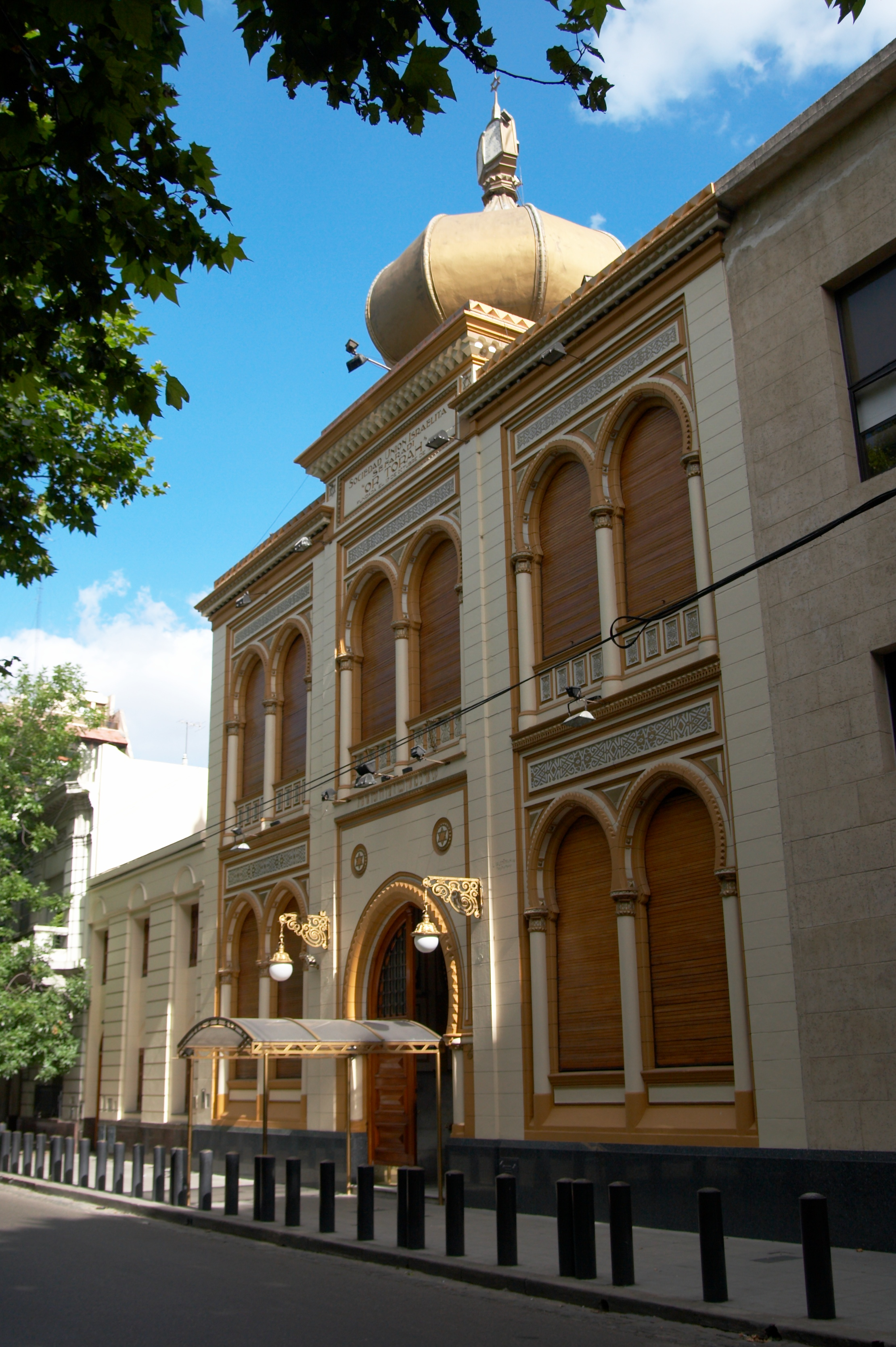
Sephardic Synagogue, Barracas district, Buenos Aires

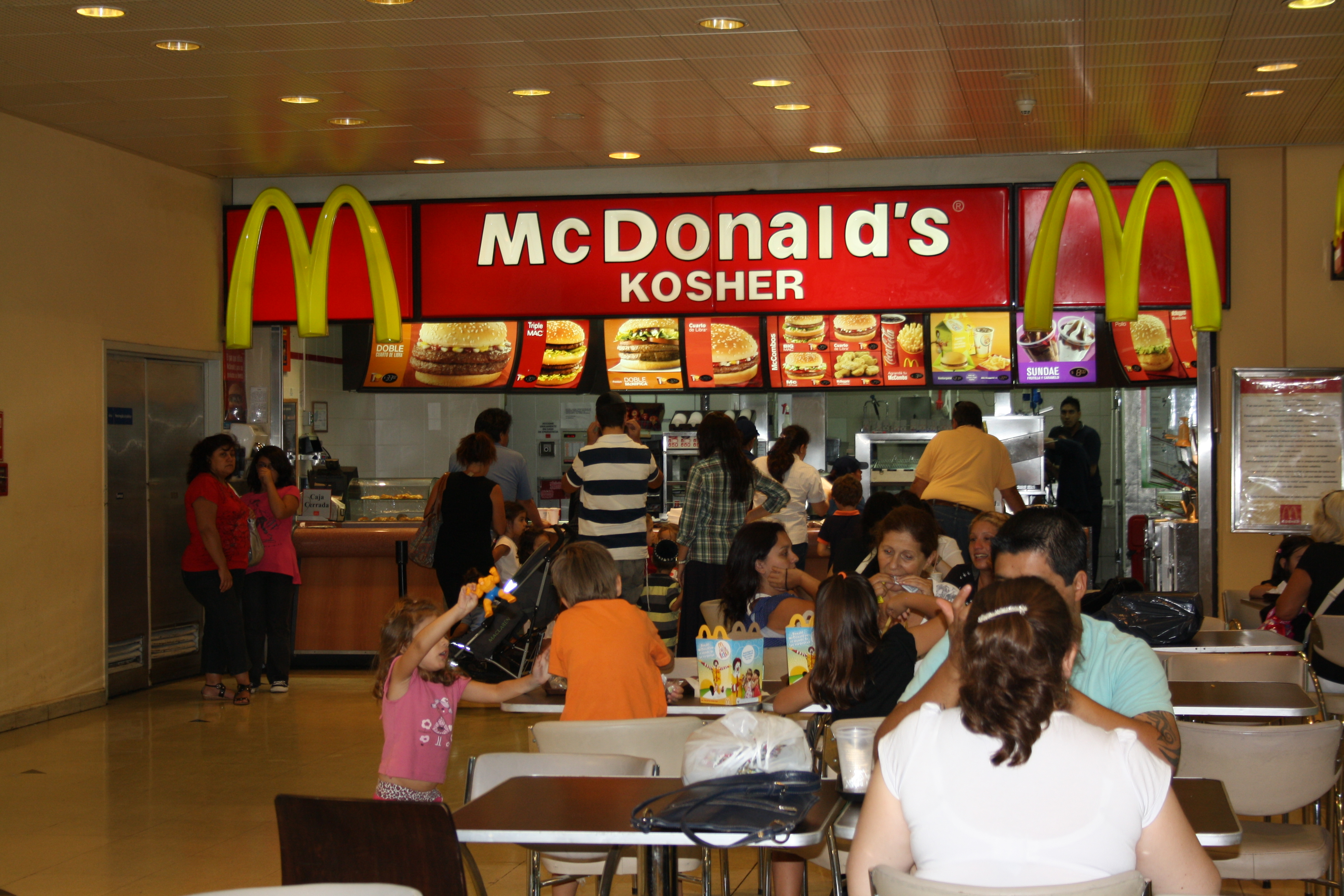
Kosher McDonald's at the Abasto Shopping in Buenos Aires.

The Buenos Aires Jewish community was established in 1862 and held its first traditional Jewish wedding in 1868. The first synagogue was inaugurated in 1875. The Ashkenazi Jews from Eastern Europe who settled in Argentina were called rusos (Russians) by the local population.

In January 1919 in Buenos Aires, during a general strike, the police fomented pogroms that targeted Jews and destroyed their property. In the strike's aftermath, civilian vigilante gangs (the Argentine Patriotic League) went after so-called agitators (agitadores), and killed or wounded "scores of victims", including "numerous Russian Jews who were falsely accused of masterminding a Communist conspiracy".

European Jews continued to immigrate to Argentina, including during the Great Depression of the 1930s and to escape increasing Nazi persecution. "In 1939 half the owners and workers of small manufacturing plants were foreigners, many of them newly arrived Jewish refugees from Central Europe".

Jewish cultural and religious organizations flourished in the cities; a Yiddish press and theatre opened in Buenos Aires, as well as a Jewish hospital and a number of Zionist organizations. The Zwi Migdal organization established in the 1860s in Buenos Aires operated an international network of pimps exploiting Jewish girls from Eastern Europe.

The largest Jewish cemetery in Latin America, La Tablada Israelite Cemetery, is located in the outskirts of Buenos Aires. It was established in 1936 and houses over 150,000 graves.

== Status ==
Today, approximately 180,500 Jews live in Argentina, down from 310,000 in the early 1960s. Most of Argentina's Jews live in Buenos Aires, Córdoba, and Rosario.

Argentina's Jewish population is the largest in Latin America, and the third-largest in the Americas (after that of the United States and Canada). It is the sixth-largest in the world. (See Jewish population). It is the largest in the Southern Hemisphere, and arguably encompasses over half of all Jewish Spanish language native speakers.

Additionally, Buenos Aires is the sixteenth largest Jewish city in the world by population. The government has recognized major Jewish holidays and allows Jews to have two days of vacation each for Rosh Hashanah, Yom Kippur, and the first two and last two days of Passover.

== Historic Jewish colonies in Argentina ==
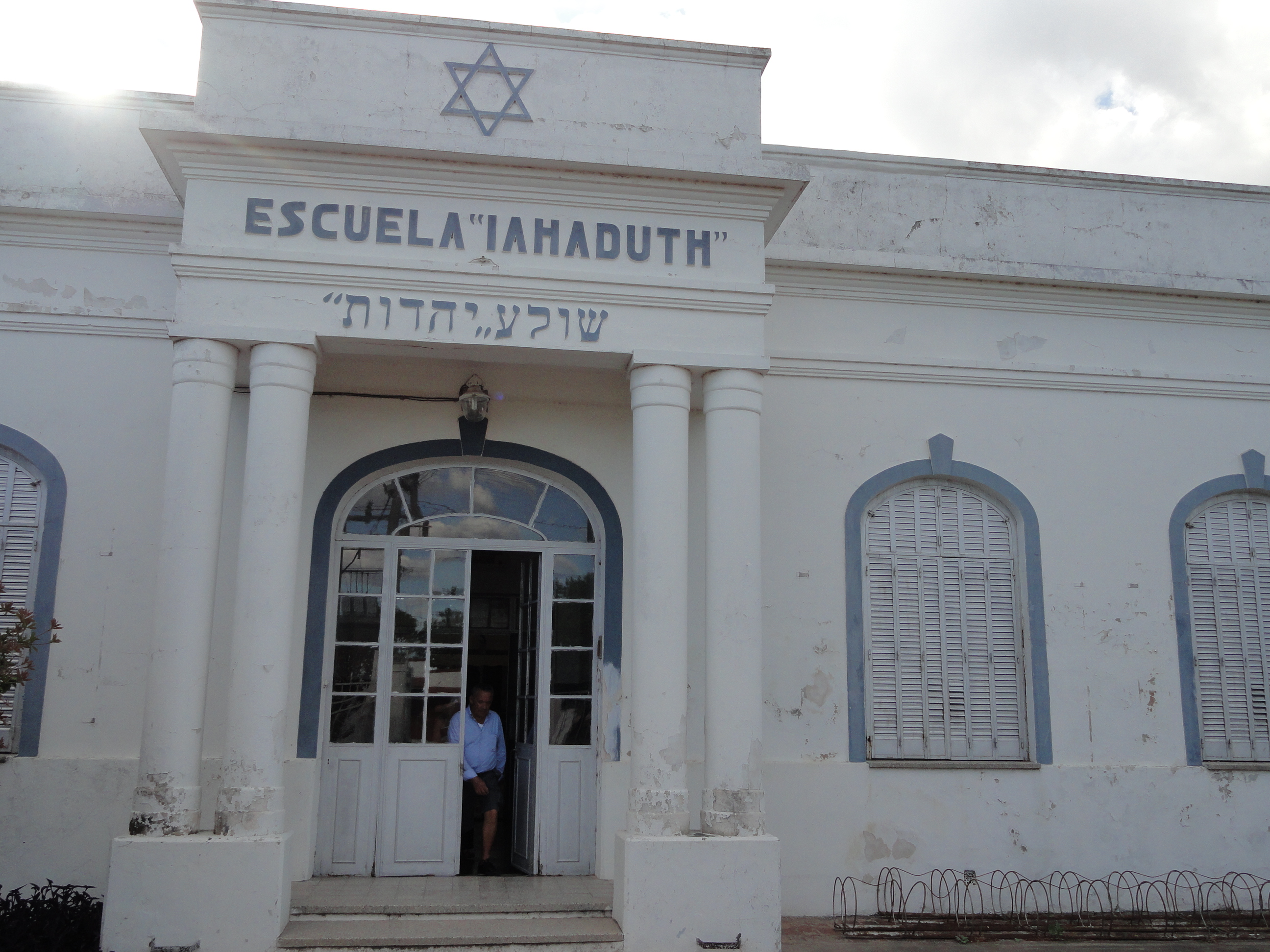
Iahaduth Jewish school in Moisés Ville, Santa Fe.

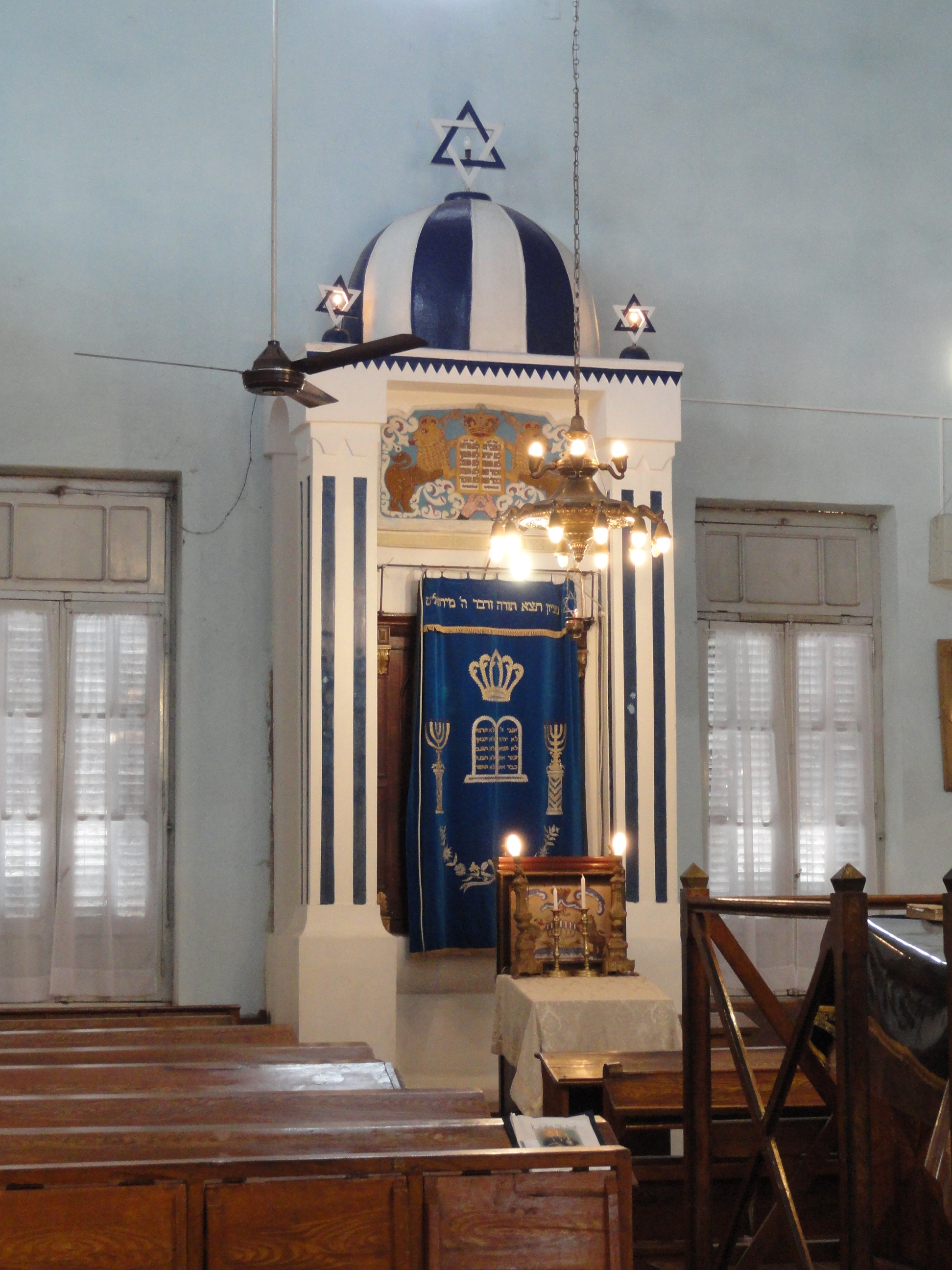
View of the interior of the Baron Hirsch Synagogue in Moisés Ville, Santa Fe.

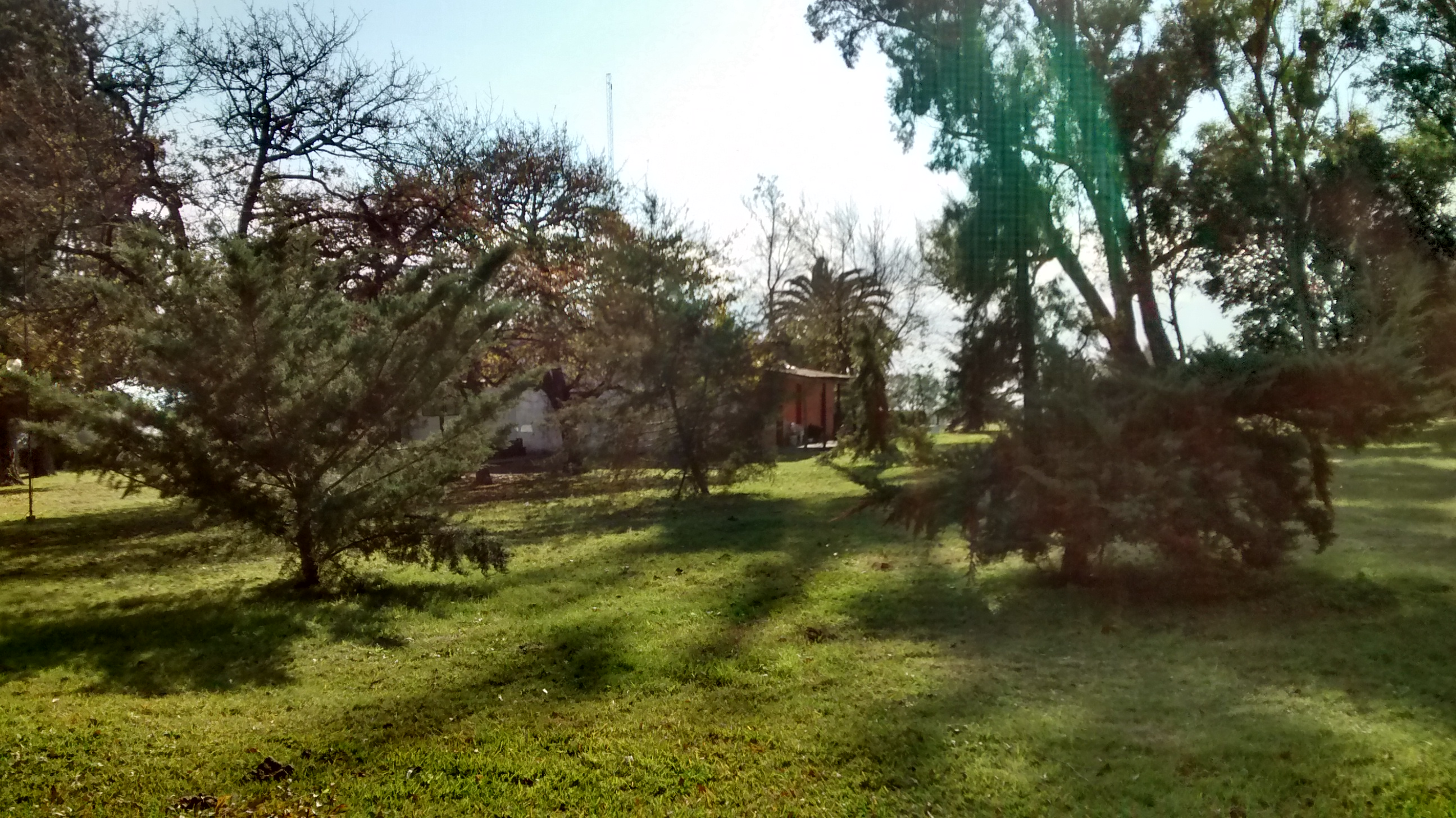
Jewish Colonization Association, Colonia Avigdor, Entre Ríos.

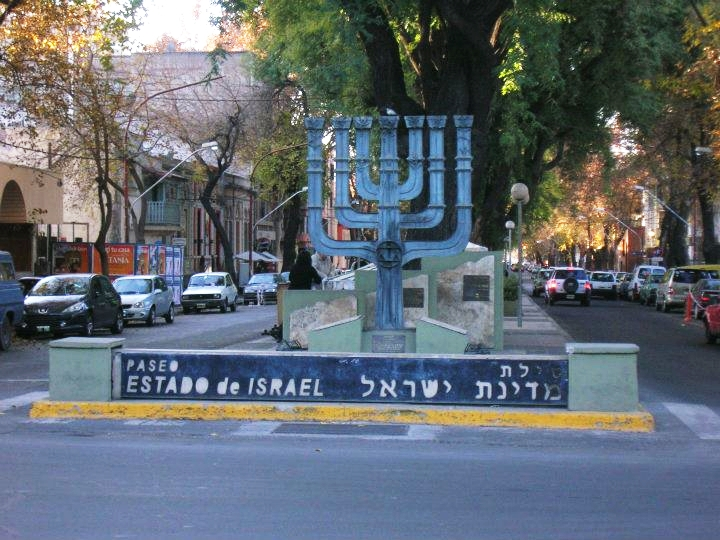
State of Israel Drive in the City of Mendoza.

Buenos Aires Province

- Carlos Casares
- Colonia Lapin
- Mauricio Hirsch
- Delfin Huergo
- Moctezuma
- Rivera
- Smith

Entre Ríos Province

- Colonia Avigdor
- Basavilbaso (Lucienville)
- Bovril
- Carmel
- Clara
- Cohen
- General Campos
- Ingeniero Sajaroff
- La Clarita
- Pedernal
- Pueblo Arrua
- San Gregorio (Colonia Sonnenfeld)
- San Salvador
- Santa Isabel
- Ubajay
- Villa Dominguez
- Villaguay
- Wulfshon

Santa Fe Province

- Capivara
- Ceres
- Las Palmeras
- Palacios
- Moisés Ville
- Virginia

La Pampa Province

- Bernasconi
- General Acha
- Rolon

Santiago del Estero Province

- Colonia Dora

== See also ==
- Andinia Plan
- Argentina–Israel relations
- Asociación Mutual Israelita Argentina
- Benei Sión
- Colegio Tarbut
- Colonia Lapin
- History of the Jews in Latin America
- Immigration to Argentina
- Jewish Agency for Israel
- List of Argentine Jews
- Moisés Ville
- Next Year in Argentina – a documentary about Jews in Argentina
- Religion in Argentina
- The Jewish Gauchos
