= Colón Department, Entre Ríos =

Colón Department
- Department
- Location of Colón Department within Entre Ríos Province

- Location of Colón in Argentina
- Coordinates: 32°13′27″S 58°8′40″W
- Country: Argentina
- Province: Entre Ríos
- Head town: Colón

Area
  - Total: 2,890 km^{2} (1,120 sq mi)

Population (2022)
  - Total: 75.305
  - Density: 0.0261/km^{2} (0.0675/sq mi)
- Time zone: UTC-3 (ART)

The Colón Department (in Spanish, Departamento Colón) is an administrative subdivision (departamento) of the province of Entre Ríos, Argentina. It is located in the center-east of the province, beside the Uruguay River.

The department has 75,305 inhabitants as per the 2022 census [INDEC]. The head town is Colón (population 21,000). Other cities and towns are San José, Ubajay, Villa Elisa, Pueblo Liebig, La Clarita, Arroyo Barú, Pueblo Cazes, Hocker and Hambis.
