= Elisa Hirschhorn =

Argentine botanist

Elisa HIrschhorn
- Born: 12 July 1905; Pueblo Cazes, Entre Ríos Province, Argentina
- Died: 23 June 1995 (aged 89); Lomas de Zamora, Buenos Aires Province, Argentina
- Occupation: Mycologist
- Spouse: Luis Bernabé Mazoti

Academic background
- Education: National University of La Plata

Academic work
- Discipline: Mycology
- Sub-discipline: Smut fungi
- Institutions: National University of La Plata; National Institute for Agricultural Research; National Scientific and Technical Research Council

Elisa Hirschhorn de Mazoti (12 July 1905 – 23 June 1995) was an Argentine mycologist who specialized in smuts, a type of fungus with a large amount of teliospores.

== Biography ==
Elisa Hirschhorn was born on 12 July 1905 in Pueblo Cazes, Entre Ríos Province. She was educated at a primary school in San José, Entre Ríos and at the Colegio del Uruguay, before receiving her professor degree at the National University of La Plata (UNLP) in 1929. After working at the National Normal School of La Plata as a Professor of Physics in 1931, she returned to UNLP, where she spent some time working as a professor and, in 1938, received her doctorate in natural sciences.

Hirschhorn spent several years as a postdoctoral researcher in the United States, working at the State College of Washington Department of Plant Pathology (1943-1944) and the University of Minnesota Department of Plant Pathology and Botany (1944) and was a member of Sigma Xi (1944). She was appointed a Guggenheim Fellow in 1944 and 1945 for the purposes of studying smuts, so she was able to remain at the University of Minnesota before continuing at the Farlow Herbarium of Cryptogamic Botany.

Hirschhorn returned to Argentina after her postdoctoral training was completed. She was principal researcher at the National Institute for Agricultural Research, and she also worked at the National Center for Agricultural Research Phytotechnics Institute and the Phytotechnical Institute of Santa Catalina, the latter of which she would continue to work at as recently as 1995. She also at one point served as Director of Research and Development Projects at National Scientific and Technical Research Council.

As an academic, Hirschhorn specialized in smuts. In addition to receiving the Guggenheim Fellowship for her research on smuts, she published a few journal articles on the smut fungi genus Ustilago. In 1945, while a researcher at Washington, she discovered two species of smut fungi: Glomosporium amaranthi and Tilletia phalaridis. In 1986, she published the book Las ustilaginales de la flora argentina (lit. 'The ustilaginales of the Argentine flora'). In 1989, Hirschhorn was elected an honorary member of the Sociedad Argentina de Botánica and, at a diplomatic reception at the Embassy of the United States, Buenos Aires, Fellow of the New York Academy of Sciences.

She married Luis Bernabé Mazoti, an agronomist who worked as a professor at UNLP. She died on 23 June 1995 in Lomas de Zamora, Buenos Aires Province. After her death, Carlos Naranjo said that Hirschhorn "will be here forever in every little piece of [the Phytotechnical Institute of] Santa Catalina, and we will only have to think about her to feel her presence."
