= Liebig (disambiguation) =

Justus von Liebig (1803–1873) was a German chemist.

Liebig or von Liebig may also refer to:

- Liebig (crater), a lunar crater
- Pueblo Liebig, a village and municipality in Argentina
- Liebig's Extract of Meat Company, originator of Liebig and Oxo meat extracts
- 69286 von Liebig, a minor planet in the Solar system

== People with the surname ==
- Christopher Liebig, (born 1987), German rugby union player
- Robert Liebig, German luger of the late 1920s
- Steffen Liebig (born 1989), German rugby union player
- Tina Liebig (born 1980), German racing cyclist
