= Argentine Jews in Israel =

Total population
- 50,000–70,000

Regions with significant populations
- Jerusalem, Tel Aviv

Languages
- Hebrew (Main language for all generations); Older generation: Spanish language (Rioplatense Spanish) Yiddish, Ladino

Religion
- Judaism

Argentine Jews in Israel are immigrants and descendants of the immigrants of the Argentine Jewish community who now reside within the state of Israel. Argentine Jewish immigration to Israel has been, and still is, the largest and most significant migratory flow from South America. This is because Argentina has one of the largest Jewish communities in the world, the third largest in the Americas after those in the United States and Canada, and seventh worldwide. Because of this, many Jewish Argentines are able to make aliyah and become Israeli citizens through the Law of Return. The Argentine community in Israel is about 50,000 people, although some estimates put the figure at 70,000, making it one of the fastest-growing groups in the country.

== History ==
Since the establishment of the State of Israel there has been an Argentine Jewish migratory flow to Israel although this flow has fluctuated over time. Argentina recognised the State of Israel on February 14, 1949, being one of the first countries to do so. In addition, Argentina has maintained long and stable relations with Israel. The South American nation was always opened to immigrants, and Jews were no exception to this except for a brief period when Jewish immigration was banned. Despite this, thousand of Jews entered Argentina and made it their home. It was not until the 1976 Argentine coup d'état when a large number of Jews fled the country in search of safety. The number of Argentine Jews emigrating to Israel greatly increased throughout the period of the Dirty War. Many of them settled permanently in Israel while others returned to Argentina after the fall of the junta.

Many Jewish Argentines choose Israel as an alternative to settle due to political and economic instability that has rocked Argentina in recent decades. It was during the Argentine crisis of 2001 when Israel saw the largest number of olim from the South American country. The 1992 attack on the Israeli embassy and the 1994 bombing of the Jewish Community Center in Buenos Aires also helped create an impetus for Jews to emigrate.

There is a significant number of non-Jewish Argentines, having, or being married to somebody who has, at least one Jewish grandparent, who choose Israel as their new home, either permanently or temporarily.

In 2012, according to a report by the International Organization for Migration (IOM) entitled "Migration Profile of Argentina", Israel was ranked among the top destinations chosen by the Argentines to emigrate, ranking 5th place.

=== Argentine kibbutzim ===
Several of the early Argentine pioneers in Israel settled in kibbutzim.

== See also ==
- Aliyah
- Aliyah from Latin America in the 2000s
- History of the Jews in Argentina
- Jewish ethnic divisions
- Argentina–Israel relations
