= Villa Elisa, Entre Ríos =

Villa Elisa
- City
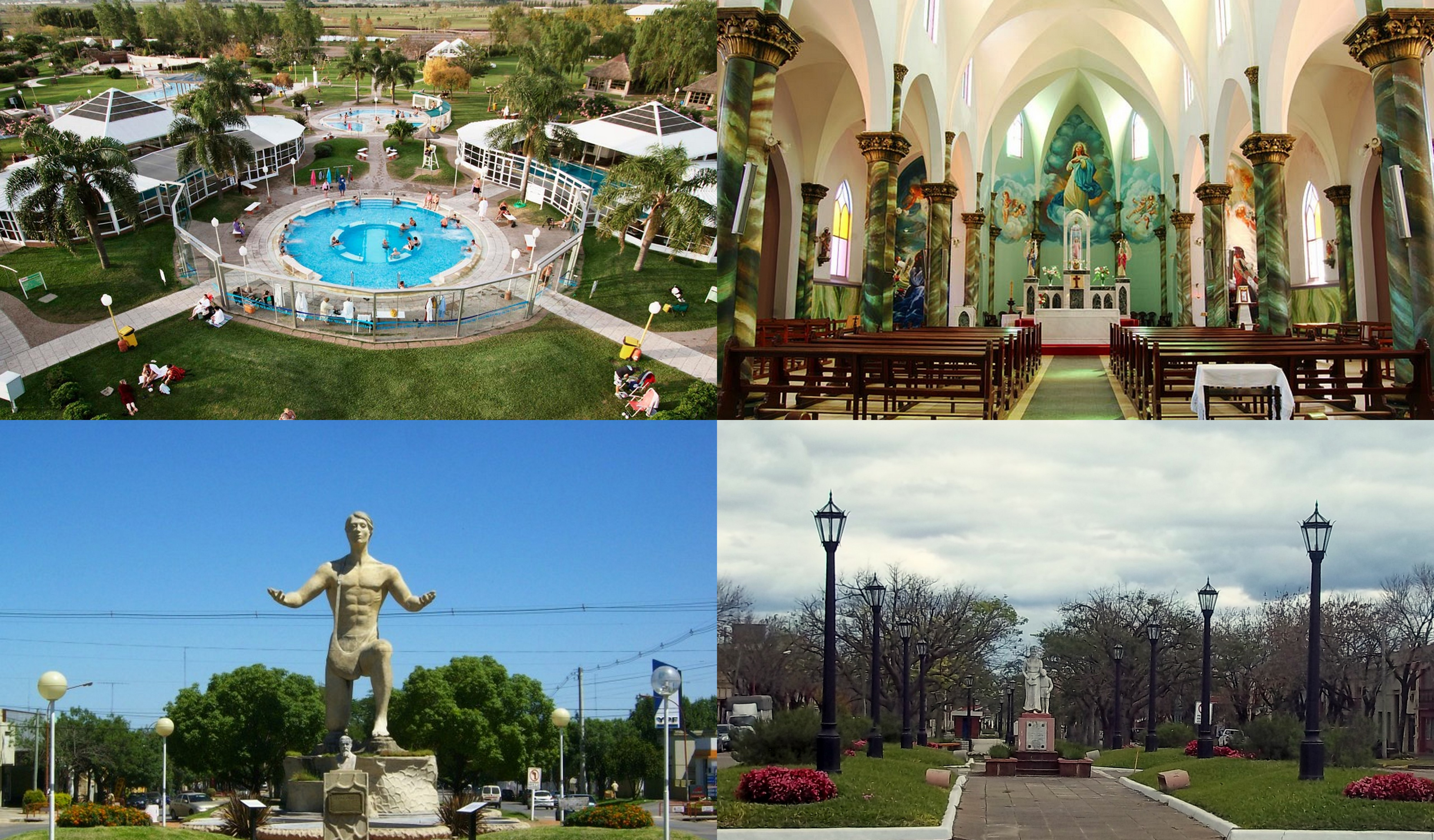

- Location of Villa Elisa in Argentina
- Coordinates: 32°10′S 58°24′W
- Country: Argentina
- Province: Entre Ríos
- Department: Colón

Population (2010 census)
  - Total: 10,266
- Time zone: UTC−3 (ART)
- CPA base: E3265
- Dialing code: +54 3447

Villa Elisa is a city in the center-east of the province of Entre Ríos, Argentina. It has 10,266 inhabitants as per the 2010 census [INDEC]. It is located about 25 west of Colón and 20 km from the Uruguay River, on National Route 130.

Like many other towns in this area, Villa Elisa features hot springs. There is a hot spring complex about 5 minutes from the city, which was opened to the public in 1999.
