= José Pékerman =

Argentine football manager (born 1949)

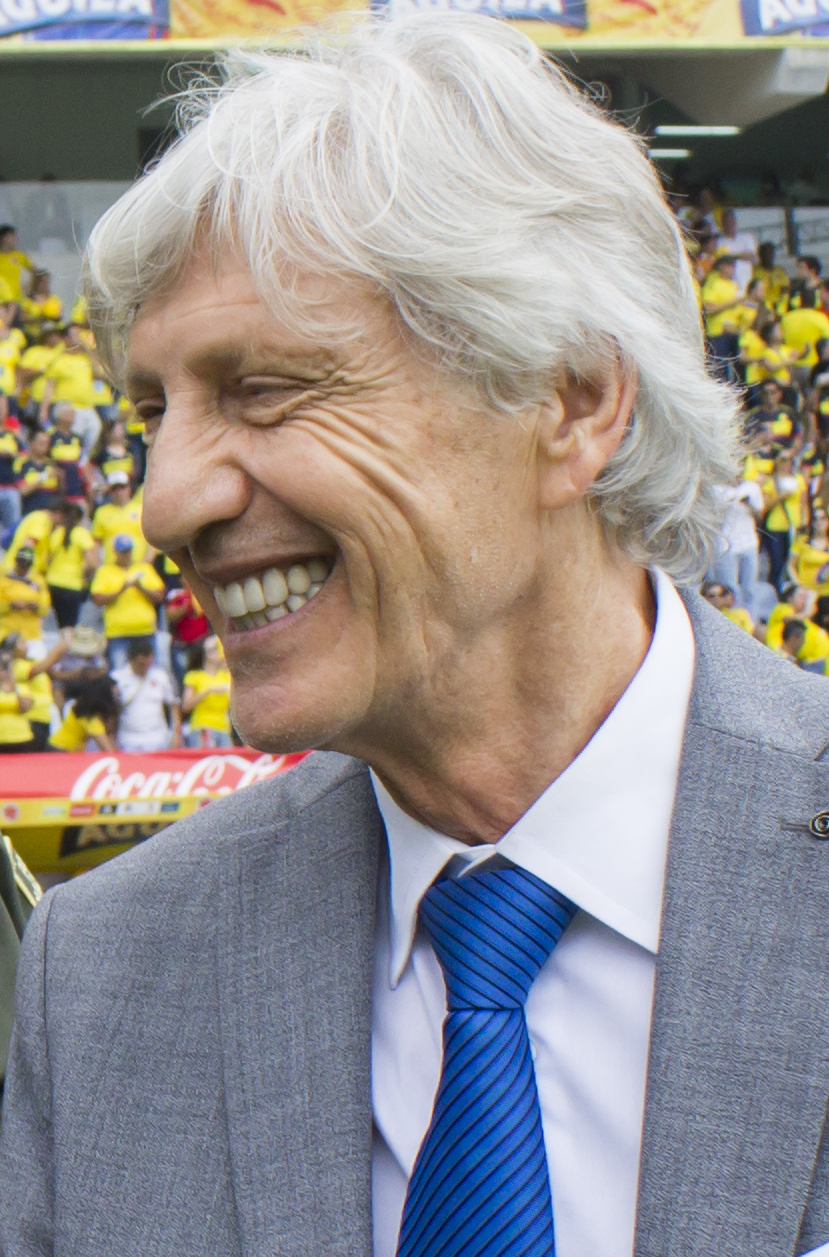
- Pékerman as Colombia manager in 2016

Personal information
- Full name: José Néstor Pékerman Krimen
- Date of birth: 3 September 1949 (age 77)
- Place of birth: Villa Domínguez, Argentina
- Height: 1.76 m (5 ft 9 in)
- Position: Midfielder

Youth career
- Argentinos Juniors

Senior career*
Years	Team	Apps	(Gls)
1970–1974	Argentinos Juniors	134	(12)
1974–1977	Independiente Medellín	101	(15)
Total		235	(27)

Managerial career
- 1981–1982: Chacarita Juniors (youth)
- 1982–1992: Argentinos Juniors (youth)
- 1992–1994: Colo-Colo (youth)
- 1994–2001: Argentina U20
- 2004–2006: Argentina
- 2007–2008: Toluca
- 2009: Tigres UANL
- 2012–2018: Colombia
- 2021–2023: Venezuela
- * Club domestic league appearances and goals

José Néstor Pékerman Krimen (Spanish pronunciation: [xoˈse ˈpekerman]; born 3 September 1949) is an Argentine professional football coach. His last team managed was the Venezuela national team. As a youth level coach for Argentina, he won the FIFA World Youth Championship three times, and the U20 South American Youth Championship twice. He coached the Argentina national football team in the 2006 FIFA World Cup and became coach of the Colombia national team in 2012. He subsequently managed the Colombia national team during the 2014 and 2018 FIFA World Cups where he led the team to their best result, the quarterfinals, in 2014, their first World Cup qualification after 16 years of absence.

== Playing career ==
Pékerman's career as a footballer was uneventful. A midfielder, he played from 1970 to 1974 for Argentinos Juniors scoring 12 goals in 134 matches. He was transferred to Independiente Medellín, in Colombia, where he scored 15 goals in 101 matches.

His player days ended at age 28 with a serious knee injury. Pékerman supported himself and his family with various odd jobs, including a stint as a taxi driver.

== Coaching career ==
=== Youth coaching ===
Back in Argentina, Pékerman worked as a youth coach for Chacarita Juniors and then occupied the same position with Argentinos Juniors. He then moved to Chile to coach Colo-Colo's youth divisions.

In 1994, he was offered to coach the Argentina national under-20 and under-17 sides by the Argentine Football Association. This caused some surprise as his résumé did not include any major achievements at this stage. He teamed up with Hugo Tocalli and coach Eduardo Urtasun.

Pékerman's success, however, silenced the critics: his under-20 team won the FIFA World Youth Championship three times, 1995 (Qatar), 1997 (Malaysia), and 2001 (hosted by Argentina, where the team defeated Ghana in the final). As a result of these championships, Pékerman gave the names to his three pet dogs – Qatar, Malaysia and Argentina. The team also won the two South American Youth Championships in 1997 and 1999.

When the national coach Daniel Passarella resigned after the 1998 World Cup, Pékerman was offered his position. He declined, assuming instead the position of general manager of all national teams. Marcelo Bielsa was hired as coach on Pékerman's recommendation, and remained in charge until after Argentina's gold medal performance in the 2004 Summer Olympics.

In 2003, Pékerman moved to Spain at the behest of Argentine businessman Daniel Grinbank, who had acquired Spanish Second Division side CD Leganés. After a few months serving as director of football, the project crumbled and Pékerman left Spain.

When Marcelo Bielsa resigned as coach, Pékerman was one of the two candidates for the coaching job, alongside Carlos Bianchi, who had left Boca Juniors a few months earlier, and wanted to take a sabbatical year away from football.

=== Argentina ===
On 15 September 2004, Pékerman was named coach of Argentina. The first competition he would participate in with Argentina would be the 2005 FIFA Confederations Cup. The team made it to the final, which they would lose to Brazil 4–1. Pékerman then led the team to the 2006 World Cup. The nation dominated its initial two group stage matches and drew with the Netherlands in the third match, emerging on top of their group on goal difference. The Albicelestes then moved on to the round of 16, beating Mexico 2–1 after extra time in a comeback victory.

In the quarter-finals, Argentina went ahead 1–0 against hosts Germany, but shortly before the end of the match, Germany equalised through a Miroslav Klose header. Germany would go on to win on penalties, sending Argentina out of the tournament. Pékerman made defensive substitutions, including taking off Juan Román Riquelme for Esteban Cambiasso, and also not giving Lionel Messi an opportunity to play the match. After the loss, announced his resignation. Argentine Football Association (AFA) President Julio Grondona tried to dissuade Pékerman from leaving, but it was later announced that Alfio Basile, who had previously coached Argentina during the 1994 World Cup, would replace him as coach.

=== Coaching in Mexico ===
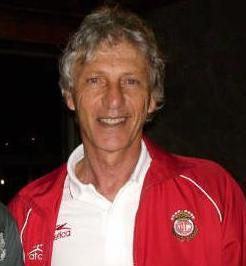
Pékerman in 2007

On 30 May 2007, Pékerman resumed his coaching career, taking up the position of head coach of Club Toluca in Mexico, replacing fellow Argentine Américo Gallego. At the end of the Clausura 2008 tournament, he was replaced by José Manuel de la Torre.

On 23 February 2009, Pékerman was appointed as the head coach of UANL Tigres after the sacking of Manuel Lapuente following a series of bad results. After the end of Clausura 2009, however, he was terminated and replaced by Daniel Guzmán.

In July 2010, it had been reported that Pékerman was in serious talks with the Australia national team, as well as talks with the Japan national team about taking over the role as senior manager following the resignation of their managers.

=== Colombia ===
In January 2012, Pékerman became the new coach of the Colombia national team, replacing ousted coach Leonel Álvarez. Pékerman was the third coach of the Colombia team during the South American World Cup qualifiers; before Álvarez, Hernán Darío Gómez was at the helm. For his first match, a friendly against Mexico, Pékerman impressed, with the Colombians completely taking control of the friendly in an eventual 2–0 victory. In his first qualifying match for the 2014 World Cup, a struggling Colombia managed to win 0–1 over Peru in Lima. Pékerman, however, was criticized for using a long-range style of play rather than a close midfield passing control. This resulted in a weak Colombia side that lost to Ecuador 1–0 away from home, his first defeat.

In his home debut, Pékerman orchestrated an astonishing comeback as Colombia demolished 2011 Copa América champions Uruguay 4–0 in the seventh round of World Cup qualifiers. Under his direction, Colombia also won 1–3 away over Chile and 2–0 over Paraguay at home in Barranquilla. A few days later, Pékerman experimented without many star players such as Radamel Falcao and James Rodríguez against Cameroon, resulting in a comfortable 3–0 home victory. For the last match of 2012, Colombia drew 2014 World Cup hosts Brazil 1–1 despite missing two of the squad's star players.

In the opening match of 2013, Pékerman experimented yet again, this time against the Guatemala side; he used only substitutes in a 4–1 victory, opting not to deploy senior stars, including Radamel Falcao. During the next round of qualifiers, Pékerman continued with the promising 4–2–2–2 formation that facilitated Colombia's comfortable defeat of Bolivia in a 5–0 home victory. Pékerman, however, decided to use a different formation in the match, 4–4–1–1, which led to a shocking 1–0 away loss to neighbours Venezuela. He was heavily criticized for experimenting with his side's formation, a loss that took the nation from second to third place in the qualifying table. In the match against his home nation Argentina, Pékerman changed the lineup and formation to better "deal" with the South American giants, which led to a hard-fought 0–0 draw. Despite this, Pékerman was again questioned with his lineup choices.

After Colombia qualified for the 2014 World Cup after a 3–3 home draw against Chile, Pékerman expressed his joy for helping Colombia return to the World Cup for the first time in 16 years, considering it to be "one of the greatest joys in his life." Following Colombia's qualification, Pékerman was granted Colombian citizenship from Juan Manuel Santos, the president of Colombia. However, he did not accept it.

Colombia won all three of its group matches (scoring nine goals and conceding only two) and went on to defeat Uruguay in the Round of 16 before losing to the host nation of Brazil in the quarter-finals. In August 2014, Pékerman extended his contract with Colombia until 2018.

For the second consecutive time, Pékerman qualified Colombia for the FIFA World Cup this time for the 2018 edition in Russia. Colombia suffered a controversial defeat in their first group stage game against a well-organized and determined Japan, but then came out much stronger to inflict a 3–0 victory over Poland (effectively knocking them out of the tournament in the process). After beating Senegal 1–0 in the last game of the group stage, Colombia qualified to the round of 16 as first in their group. After a bitter and contested match, Colombia lost 4–3 on penalties to England after a 1–1 draw. In September 2018, Pékerman decided not to renew his contract, and left his position as Colombia manager after six years in charge.

=== Venezuela ===
In November 2021, Pékerman became the head coach of Venezuela. He failed to lead the nation to the World Cup in Qatar, finishing bottom of South American qualifying. On 8 March 2023, the Venezuelan Football Federation (FVF) parted ways with Pekerman. The FVF did not expand on the reasons for the Argentine coach's dismissal.

== Honours ==
=== Manager ===
Argentina U20

- South American Youth Championship: 1997, 1999; runner-up 1995, 2001
- FIFA U-20 World Cup: 1995, 1997, 2001

Argentina

- FIFA Confederations Cup runner-up: 2005

Colombia

- Copa América Third-place: 2016

=== Individual ===
- South American Coach of the Year: 2012, 2013, 2014
- IFFHS Best National Coach of the Year Nominee: 2013 (5th)

== Management style and legacy ==
Pékerman is known for his tactical management style, often selecting the players that fit his style of coaching, regardless of how talented a player is. Pékerman can make controversial selections with line-ups against certain teams. He experimented heavily with the Argentinean youth squads when he was coaching them.

Before the 2006 World Cup began, Pékerman made the controversial decision to drop established defenders Javier Zanetti and Walter Samuel. When Argentina was eliminated by Germany in the quarter-finals, his substitution decision during the match (substituting Juan Román Riquelme for Esteban Cambiasso in the 72nd minute) caused storms of criticism, as well. Despite the dramatic loss, Pékerman was still hailed by many fans and press as a very effective coach and the "Pékerman Era" is regarded as one that brought a lot of pride to the country. His team lost its temper after the elimination and instigated a huge brawl, which was believed to be a major factor in his resignation.

== Managerial statistics ==
Statistics accurate as of 20 November 2022

Team	From	To	Record				
Team	From	To	P	W	D	L	Win %
Argentina U17	May 1995	September 1997	23	15	3	5	65.22
Argentina U20	January 1995	December 2001	58	42	8	8	72.41
Argentina U23	September 1999	February 2000	15	8	3	4	53.33
Argentina	October 2004	June 2006	27	14	7	6	51.85
Toluca	August 2007	May 2008	41	18	14	9	43.90
Tigres UANL	March 2009	May 2009	10	1	5	4	10.00
Colombia	February 2012	August 2018	77	42	20	15	54.55
Venezuela	November 2021	March 2023	10	5	1	4	50.00
Total			261	145	61	55	55.56

== Personal life ==
Pékerman was born in Villa Domínguez, Entre Ríos. His grandparents were Ukrainian Ashkenazi Jews who emigrated from Uman and settled in the colonies of Entre Ríos Province.

Following Colombia's qualification for the 2014 World Cup, Pekerman stated his desire to be a naturalized Colombian, which was granted by President Juan Manuel Santos the following day.

== See also ==
- National team managers with 100 or more matches
