= Hugo Tocalli =

Argentine footballer and manager

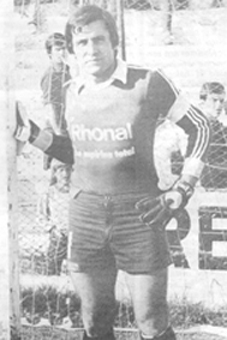
- Tocalli as a Quilmes player

Personal information
- Full name: Hugo Daniel Tocalli
- Date of birth: 21 January 1948 (age 78)
- Place of birth: Monte Buey, Córdoba, Argentina
- Position: Goalkeeper

Team information
- Current team: Independiente (youth coordinator)

Youth career
- San Lorenzo

Senior career*
Years	Team	Apps	(Gls)
1970	Deportivo Morón	2	(0)
1971–1974	Nueva Chicago	103	(0)
1975–1976	Quilmes	119	(0)
1976–1977	América de Cali	27	(0)
1977	Argentinos Juniors	7	(0)
1978–1983	Quilmes	117	(0)
1984	Unión Santa Fe	35	(0)
1985	Atlanta	19	(0)
Total		429	(0)

Managerial career
- 1988–1989: Vélez Sarsfield (interim)
- 1989–1990: Quilmes
- 1990–1991: Tigre
- 1992–1993: Deportivo Italiano
- 1994: Quilmes
- 2001: Argentina U17
- 2005–2007: Argentina U20
- 2007–2009: Vélez Sarsfield
- 2009–2010: Colo-Colo
- 2010: Quilmes
- 2013–2015: Chile U20
- 2020: San Lorenzo (interim)
- 2024: Independiente (interim)
Medal record
Men's football
Representing Argentina (as manager)
FIFA U-20 World Cup
Winner	2007
- * Club domestic league appearances and goals

Hugo Daniel Tocalli (born 21 January 1948) is an Argentine professional football coach and former player. He is the current youth coordinator of Independiente.

Tocalli played over 400 games as a goalkeeper, and went on to coach a number of clubs as well as the Argentina under-20 team.

== Playing career ==
Tocalli was with San Lorenzo de Almagro before starting his playing career in 1970 with Deportivo Morón. In 1971, he joined Nueva Chicago where he played until 1974.

In 1975, Tocalli started his first spell with Quilmes before moving to Argentinos Juniors in 1977 where he was a teammate of the young Diego Maradona.

Tocalli returned to Quilmes in 1978 and was part of the team that won the Metropolitano championship in 1978. He stayed with the club until 1983.

Tocalli had short spells with Unión de Santa Fe and Atlanta before retiring in 1985.

== Managerial career ==
After retiring as a player Tocalli worked with the youth team of Vélez Sarsfield and had a brief stint as caretaker manager during the 1988–1989 season. In 1989, he became the manager of Quilmes. He then had spells in charge at Tigre and Deportivo Italiano before returning to Quilmes in 1994.

In 1994, Tocalli became involved with the Argentine youth team, alongside José Pékerman. After Peckerman became the national team coach, Tocalli took over as Under-20 coach, leading the team to the 2007 FIFA U-20 World Cup title. In October 2007, he resigned as head coach of the U-20 team and, in December 2007, he became the manager of Velez Sarsfield. On 21 April 2010 the Coach has left Colo-Colo due to family reasons. Quilmes Atlético Club hired Tocalli as coach on 3 June 2010. However, he resigned after the 11th fixture of the 2010–11 season, as Quilmes was unable to win any games under his coaching (6 draws, 5 defeats).

== Personal life ==
His son, Alejandro, was with the Argentinos Juniors youth ranks under José Pékerman, became a fitness coach and has worked for the Chile under-20 team, Independiente, San Lorenzo de Almagro, among others clubs.

His son, Martín, is a goalkeeping coach who has worked for the Argentine national team under Jorge Sampaoli and Lionel Scaloni.
