= Diego Colotto =

Argentine footballer

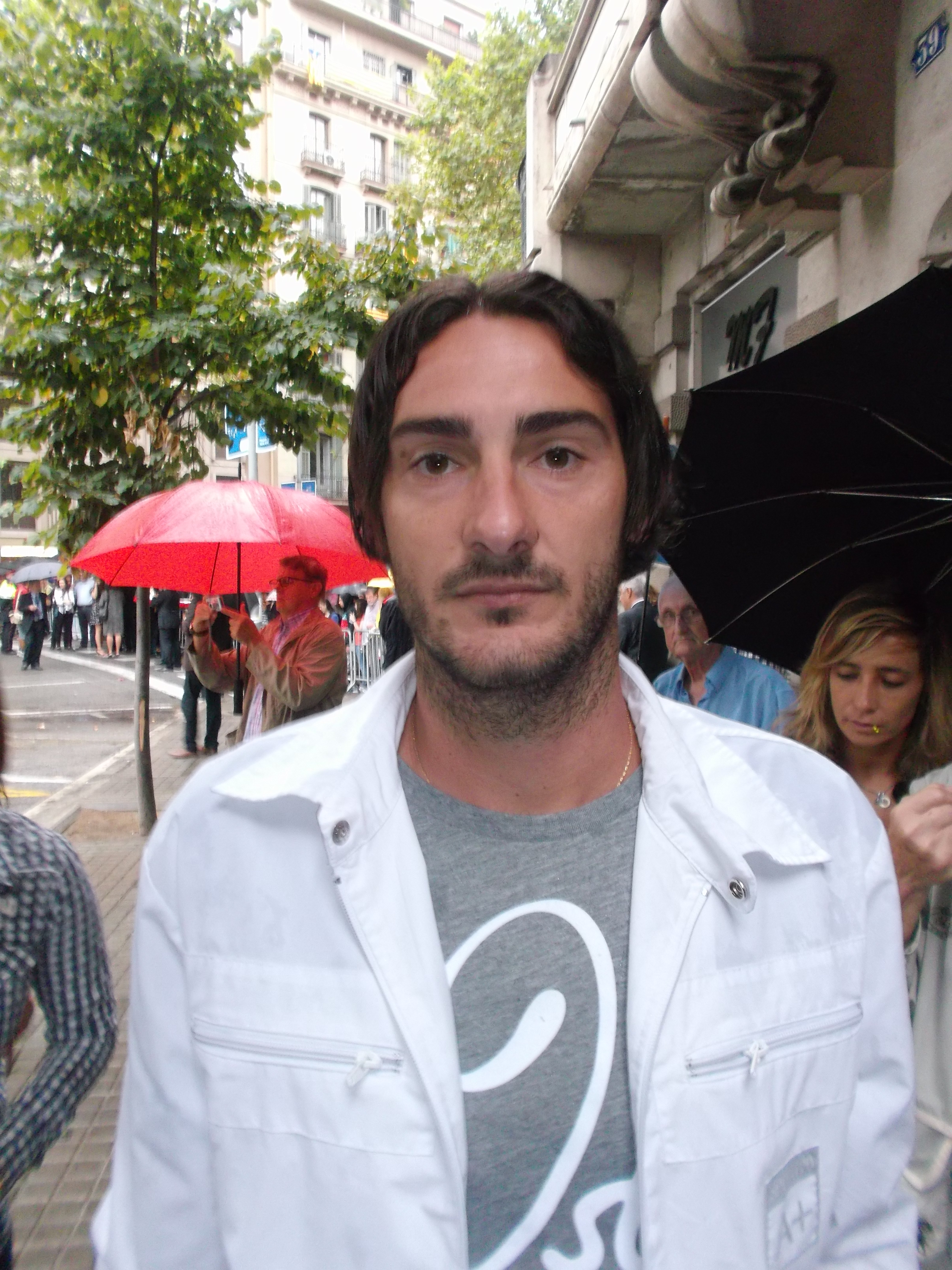
- Colotto in 2013

Personal information
- Full name: Diego Daniel Colotto
- Date of birth: 10 March 1981 (age 45)
- Place of birth: Río Cuarto, Argentina
- Height: 1.84 m (6 ft 0 in)
- Position: Centre back

Senior career*
Years	Team	Apps	(Gls)
2001–2004	Estudiantes LP	116	(4)
2005–2007	Tecos	82	(9)
2007–2008	Atlas	31	(2)
2008–2012	Deportivo La Coruña	113	(8)
2012–2015	Espanyol	82	(7)
2015	Pune City	3	(0)
2016	Lanús	3	(0)
2016–2018	Quilmes	28	(0)
Total		458	(30)

International career
2001	Argentina U20	7	(1)
- * Club domestic league appearances and goals

Diego Daniel Colotto (born 10 March 1981) is an Argentine retired footballer who played as a central defender.

After starting out at Estudiantes he went on to spend most of his professional career in Spain, with Deportivo and Espanyol.

== Club career ==
Born in Río Cuarto, Córdoba, Colotto started his professional career with Estudiantes de La Plata, making his Primera División debut on 16 February 2001 in a 1–1 draw against Club Atlético Vélez Sarsfield and eventually becoming an automatic first-choice with the La Plata club. In December 2004, Tecos F.C. from Mexico paid US$1,100,000 for his services and, almost three years later, he was signed by another team in the country, Club Atlas, playing nearly 150 competitive matches between the two.

On 30 August 2008, Colotto signed for Deportivo de La Coruña in Spain, for €2.5 million. In his first season in La Liga he backed up Alberto Lopo and Zé Castro but, on 2 October, scored twice against SK Brann in the first round of the UEFA Cup: after the Galicians lost 0–2 in Norway, his brace – after heading home two corner kicks – took the game to extra time and an eventual penalty shootout, where the home team prevailed to reach the group stage.

In the following seasons, Colotto relegated Portuguese Castro to the bench and partnered Lopo at the heart of the back sector, under Miguel Ángel Lotina. In the 2009–10 campaign two of his three league goals came in both matches against CD Tenerife (1–0 away, 3–1 at the Estadio Riazor) as Deportivo finished tenth.

On 22 June 2012, free agent Colotto joined fellow league team RCD Espanyol on a three-year contract. In 2013–14, he equalled a career-best four goals as the Catalans narrowly avoided relegation.

Colotto spent the 2015 season in the Indian Super League, with FC Pune City. In February 2016, at nearly 35, he returned to his country and agreed to a six-month deal at Club Atlético Lanús with the option of further extending it.

Colotto spent the 2016–17 campaign with Quilmes Atlético Club, acting as team captain and eventually suffering relegation to the Primera B Nacional. He was then released on 19 July 2017 alongside six players as the board of directors feared injuries that would imply that the contracts be automatically renewed, only to return the following month and put pen to a paper to a new contract.

== International career ==
Colotto was part of the Argentina under-20 team that competed at the 2001 FIFA World Youth Championship on home soil. He played all the matches and minutes for the eventual winners during the tournament, scoring in the final against Ghana (3–0).

== Honours ==
=== Club ===
Deportivo

- UEFA Intertoto Cup: 2008
- Segunda División: 2011–12

=== International ===
Argentina

- FIFA U-20 World Cup: 2001
