= 2001 FIFA World Youth Championship final =

2001 FIFA U-20 World Cup final
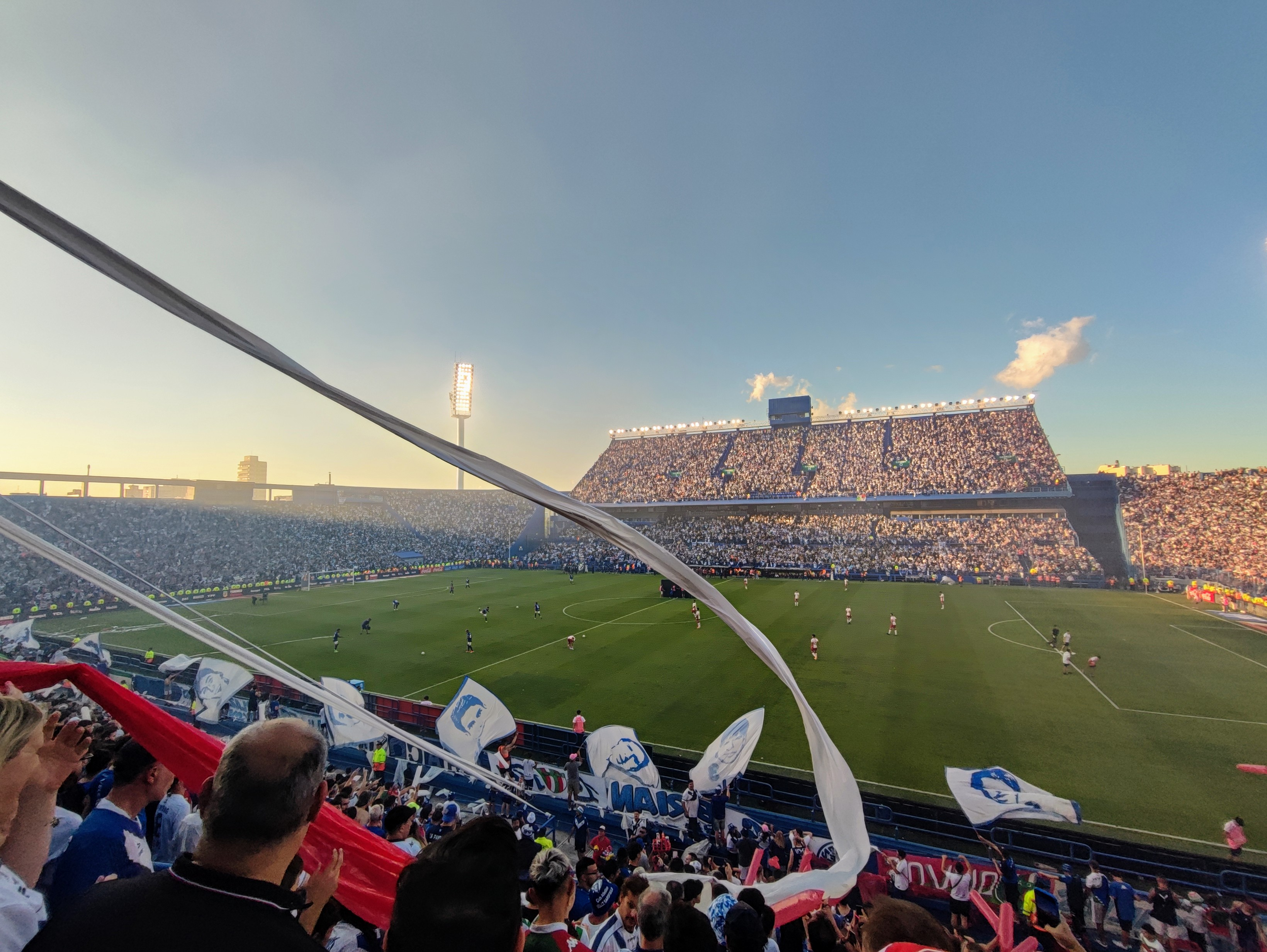
- José Amalfitani Stadium in 2024
- Event: 2001 FIFA U-20 World Cup
Argentina	Ghana
(Argentina)	(Ghana)
3	0
- Date: 8 July 2001
- Venue: José Amalfitani Stadium, Buenos Aires
- Referee: Manuel Mejuto González (Spain)
- Attendance: 32,000

The 2001 FIFA World Youth Championship final was the final match and culmination of the 2001 FIFA World Youth Championship, hosted by Argentina. The game was played at the José Amalfitani Stadium in Buenos Aires on 8 July 2001 and was contested between Argentina and Ghana. The match was won by Argentina, 3–0, obtaining their fourth FIFA U-20 World Cup title.

== Background ==
The hosts, Argentina, who were playing a tournament at home for the first time since the 1978 FIFA World Cup, had easily reached the final by defeating rivals in both group and knockout stages by a margin of more than two goals, with the exception of the round of 16 match against China, which ended 2–1. Previously, the South Americans had defeated Finland (2–0), Egypt (7–1), and Jamaica 5–1. After winning its game against China, the Argentines defeated France in the quarterfinals (3–1) and Paraguay in the semifinals by a crushing score of 5–0.

In Group F, Ghana had defeated Paraguay and Iran while ending in a goalless draw in its match against France. At the round of 16 game, the African team earned a 1–0 victory against Ecuador and defeated Brazil in the quarterfinals, with John Mensah scoring a golden goal in the 93rd minute of extra time.

== Match ==
The final match took place at the José Amalfitani Stadium in Buenos Aires on 8 July 2001 before 32,000 spectators. Spanish referee Manuel Mejuto González was appointed for the final, with assistant referees José Ramírez Díaz of Mexico and Simeon Tsolakidis of Greece.

Argentina completely dominated the game, opening the score in the sixth minute when Diego Colotto beat the Ghanaian goalkeeper Maxwell Banahene to put the albiceleste forward 1–0. In the 14th minute, Argentina's star player Javier Saviola scored the second goal after a head kick. After Saviola's goal, the Argentines contained Ghanaian offensives and took control of the ball possession. In the 73rd minute, Maxi Rodríguez scored the final goal after an assist by Andrés D'Alessandro to put Argentina forward by a margin of three goals.

Referee Mejuto González issued a total of three yellow cards, two to Ghanaian players (John Mensah and Sulley Muntari) while defender Leonardo Ponzio was the Argentine player shown the card.

== Summary ==
2001 FIFA World Youth Championship
8 July 2001
17:05
Final

Argentina	3–0	Ghana
Colotto 6'; Saviola 14'; Rodríguez 73'	Report

José Amalfitani Stadium, Buenos Aires
Attendance: 32,000
Referee: Manuel Mejuto González (Spain)

Assistant referees:
José Ramírez Díaz (Mexico)
Simeon Tsolakidis (Greece)

== Legacy ==
Argentine media largely consider the team of 2001 as a trailblazer, highlighting the figures of D'Alessandro, Maxi Rodríguez and Saviola as the most outstanding. The title also crowned the golden era lived by Argentine youth teams under the managership of José Pekerman. Argentina would win its next under-20 World Cup four years later in the Netherlands, where Lionel Messi debuted in the national youth team. Ghana, on the other side, won the title in 2009 by defeating Brazil in the final of the tournament held in Egypt.
