= San José, Entre Ríos =

San José
- City
- Location of San José in Argentina
- Coordinates: 32°12′S 58°13′W
- Country: Argentina
- Province: Entre Ríos
- Department: Colón
- Founded: 2 July 1857
- Founder: Justo José de Urquiza

Government
  - Mayor: Gustavo Bastian
- Elevation: 35 m (115 ft)

Population (2022 Census)
  - Total: 18,178
- Demonym: Sanjoseño/a
- Time zone: UTC−3 (ART)
- CPA base: E3283
- Dialing code: +54 3447
- Website: www.sanjose.gob.ar

San José (frequently referred to as Villa San José) is a city and municipality in the Colón Department of Entre Ríos Province, Argentina. It is located in the Argentine Mesopotamia region, approximately 10 km (6.2 mi) northwest of Colón and near the western bank of the Uruguay River. It had a population of 18,178 at the 2022 census.

The city developed as the urban centre of Colonia San José, one of the earliest and most influential agricultural immigrant settlements in Argentina, founded in 1857 by European settlers predominantly from the Swiss canton of Valais, alongside immigrants from Savoy and Piedmont.

== History ==
=== Foundation (1857) ===
During the 1850s, several alpine regions in Europe experienced widespread economic distress, exacerbated by crop failures, periodic flooding of the Rhône, and population pressure. Seeking to foster European immigration and agricultural modernization across the Argentine Confederation, General Justo José de Urquiza invited farming families to settle in Entre Ríos.

On 2 July 1857, an initial expedition of roughly 530 European immigrants landed on the banks of the Uruguay River. Most were French- and German-speaking Swiss from Valais, accompanied by Savoyards and northern Italians. Urquiza granted each family rural lots, working oxen, and farming implements, establishing Colonia San José. The settlement quickly became a pioneer model for agricultural colonies across the country.

=== Heritage and Swiss connection ===
The settlers established cooperative agricultural practices, introducing viticulture, grain farming, and alpine masonry to the region. The Museo Histórico Regional de la Colonia San José, inaugurated in 1957, curates personal diaries, tools, photographs, and genealogical records chronicling the transatlantic migration. Another prominent landmark from the pioneer era is the nearby Forclaz Mill (Molino Forclaz), an alpine-style windmill built between 1888 and 1890 by Swiss-Italian immigrant Juan Bautista Forclaz.

Ties between San José and Valais remain active through official cultural exchanges, genealogical societies, and student visits. Many local families continue to carry distinctive Valaisan and Savoyard surnames, and the city commemorates its foundation each year with the National Colonization Festival (Fiesta Nacional de la Colonización).

== Symbols ==
The municipality launched a public contest to create an official municipal flag (Concurso Creación de la Bandera de San José) to represent the community's historical identity and immigrant roots.

In August 2026, Municipal President Gustavo Bastián, alongside the Secretariat of Tourism and Human Development, unveiled three finalist proposals selected by an evaluation jury:

- Laia y Roxy: Incorporates ears of wheat to symbolize agricultural growth, alongside colors and motifs representing the heritage of the Swiss, French, and Italian pioneer communities.
- Kairos: Features wheat ears, gears, and hands, symbolizing the labor of early colonists, community development, and intercultural integration.
- Belisa Crepuscular: Merges national, provincial, and immigrant heraldry (Argentina, Entre Ríos, France, Switzerland, and Italy) with stylized elements representing the Uruguay River.

Public voting was opened at the local tourism office, running through May 2027, with the winning flag scheduled for official adoption on the city's anniversary.

== Economy ==
San José's economy is anchored in agro-industrial processing, poultry farming, citrus orchards, rice cultivation, and timber production. In recent decades, tourism has expanded significantly, driven by heritage tourism, riverside recreation on the Uruguay River, and the San José thermal baths (Termas San José).
