= Aliyah from Latin America in the 2000s =

In the wake of the 1999–2002 Argentine political and economic crisis, many Argentine Jews emigrated to Israel. The 1992 attack on the Israeli embassy and the 1994 bombing of the Jewish Community Center in Buenos Aires also helped create an impetus for Jews to emigrate.

More than 10,000 Jews from Argentina immigrated to Israel since 2000, joining the thousands of previous olim already there. During 2002 and 2003 the Jewish Agency launched an intensive public campaign to promote aliyah from the region, and offered additional economic aid for immigrants from Argentina and Uruguay. Although the Argentine economy improved, Jews continue to immigrate to Israel, albeit in smaller numbers than before. Some of those immigrants returned to Argentina in the wake of Argentine economic growth from 2003 onwards.

Olim from other Latin American countries, such as Uruguay, Chile, Peru, Venezuela and Brazil, are also making aliyah in smaller numbers.
