= Colonia Avigdor =

Coordinates: 31°11′S 59°25′W

- Municipality and village
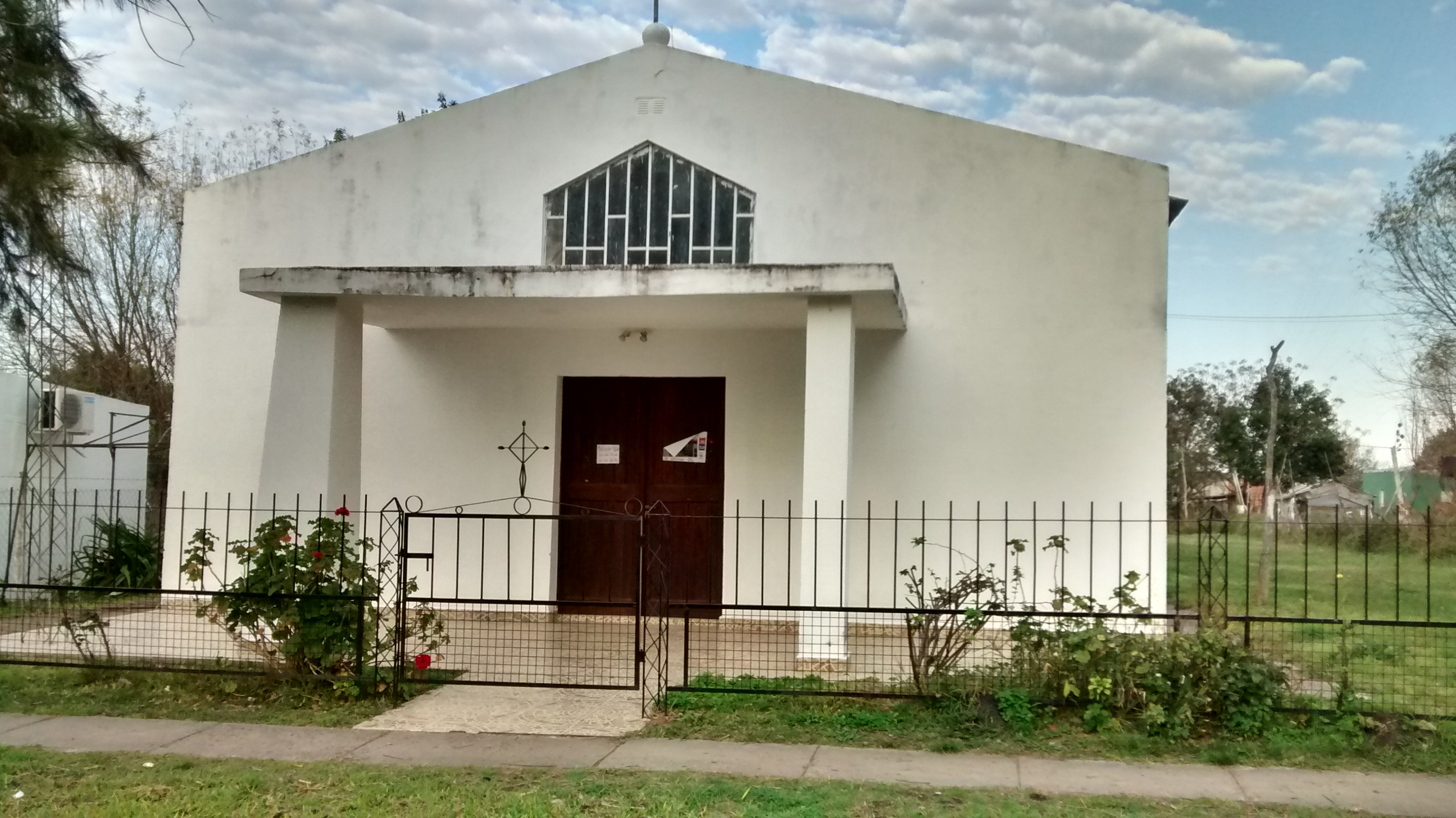
- Catholic church in Colonia Avigdor
- Interactive map of Colonia Avigdor
- Country: Argentina
- Province: Entre Ríos
- Time zone: UTC−3 (ART)

Colonia Avigdor is a village and municipality in Entre Ríos Province in north-eastern Argentina.
