= Colonia Dora =

Coordinates: 28°36′S 62°57′W

- Municipality and village
- Interactive map of Colonia Dora
- Country: Argentina
- Province: Santiago del Estero Province
- Time zone: UTC−3 (ART)

Colonia Dora is a municipality and village in Santiago del Estero Province in Argentina.
