= Ubajay =

Coordinates: 31°47′S 58°18′W

- Municipality and village
- Interactive map of Ubajay
- Country: Argentina
- Province: Entre Ríos
- Department: Colón
- Established: 1915
- Time zone: UTC−3 (ART)

Ubajay is a village and municipality in Entre Ríos Province in north-eastern Argentina. Formerly known as Pueblo Palmar and Colonia Palmar Yatay, it is a pioneer of Jewish immigration. It was promoted by the Jewish Colonization Association, a philanthropic entity created by Baron Maurice de Hirsch. On January 5, 1915, the Ubajay Station of the Argentine Northeast Railway was inaugurated, a date that is taken as foundational. The railway symbolized, at the beginning of the 20th century, as a vital artery of Argentine national production, between the Northwest and Mesopotamia, where migratory currents from Europe bet on the hope of development and progress.

== Origin of Name ==
Its name comes from the Guarani language, and it refers to the fruit tree Eugenia myrcianthes, which are abundant in the region.
