= La Clarita =

Coordinates: 31°58′S 58°24′W

- Municipality and village
- Interactive map of La Clarita
- Country: Argentina
- Province: Entre Ríos
- Time zone: UTC−3 (ART)

La Clarita is a village and municipality in Entre Ríos Province in north-eastern Argentina.
