= Pueblo Cazes =

Coordinates: 32°00′11″S 58°30′00″W

- Municipality and village
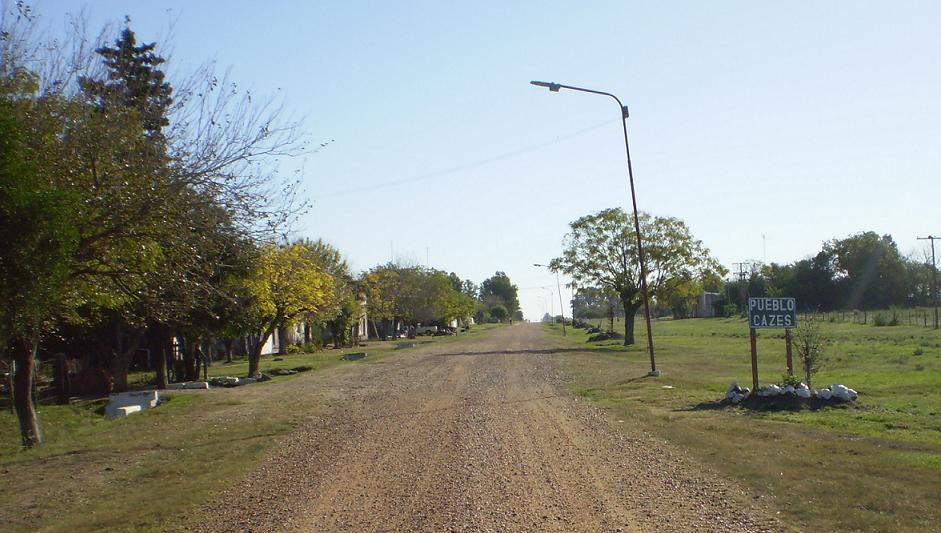
- Entrance to Pueblo Cazes from Clara
- Interactive map of Pueblo Cazes
- Country: Argentina
- Province: Entre Ríos
- Time zone: UTC−3 (ART)

Pueblo Cazes is a village and municipality in Entre Ríos Province in north-eastern Argentina.

It was founded on September 6, 1909 as part of the work of the Jewish Colonization Association as a Jewish agricultural village and grew into a place of cultural exchange between Jewish and non-Jewish Argentines.

The population of the town, without including the rural area, was 163 people in 1991 and 216 in 2001. The population of the total area was 377 people in 2001.
