= Pueblo Liebig =

Coordinates: 32°09′11″S 58°11′28″W

- Municipality and village
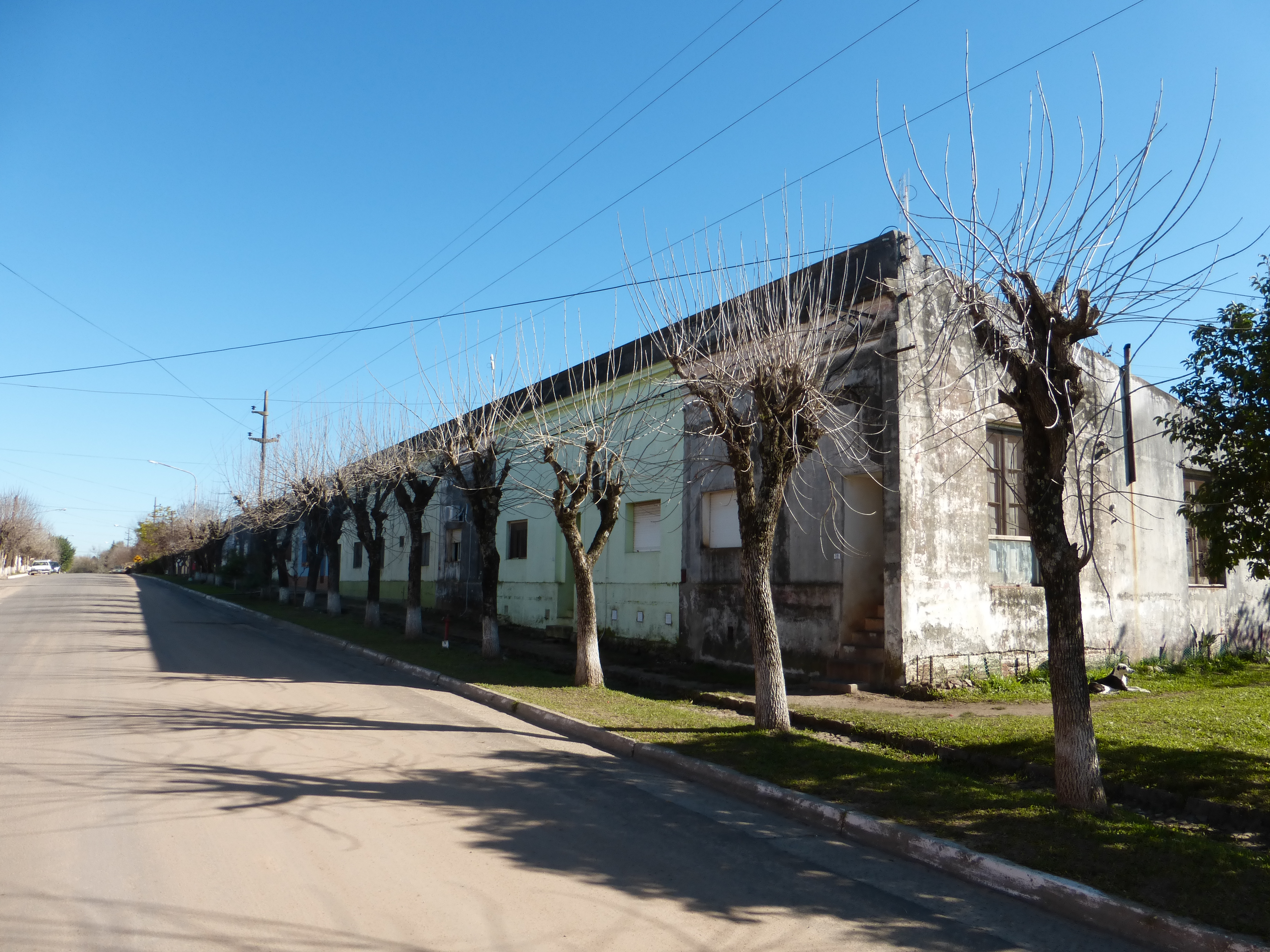
- 17 de Mayo street.
- Interactive map of Pueblo Liebig
- Country: Argentina
- Province: Entre Ríos
- Elevation: 112 ft (34 m)

Population (2010)
  - Total: 770
- Time zone: UTC−3 (ART)
- Postal code: E3281
- Area code: 03447

Pueblo Liebig is a village and municipality in Entre Ríos Province in north-eastern Argentina. This small town seduces tourists with its quiet pace, its recreational activities and a rich history.

== History ==
Agriculture and cattle-raising have always dominated the Argentine plains. Leather and beef jerky obtained from rendering plants, or saladeros, were the leading income-producing products by the middle of the nineteenth century. Saladero Colon, property of Mr. Apolinario BenítezHistory goes that the foundation stone for progress in the area used to be a small saladero -a venue where meat is salted. Due to the various technological advances that reached the meat market in the late nineteenth century, English capital began to be invested and settled at this location to develop this kind of activities. That is how Liebig's Extract of Meat Company came here to stay.
