= Colón, Entre Ríos =

Colón
- City
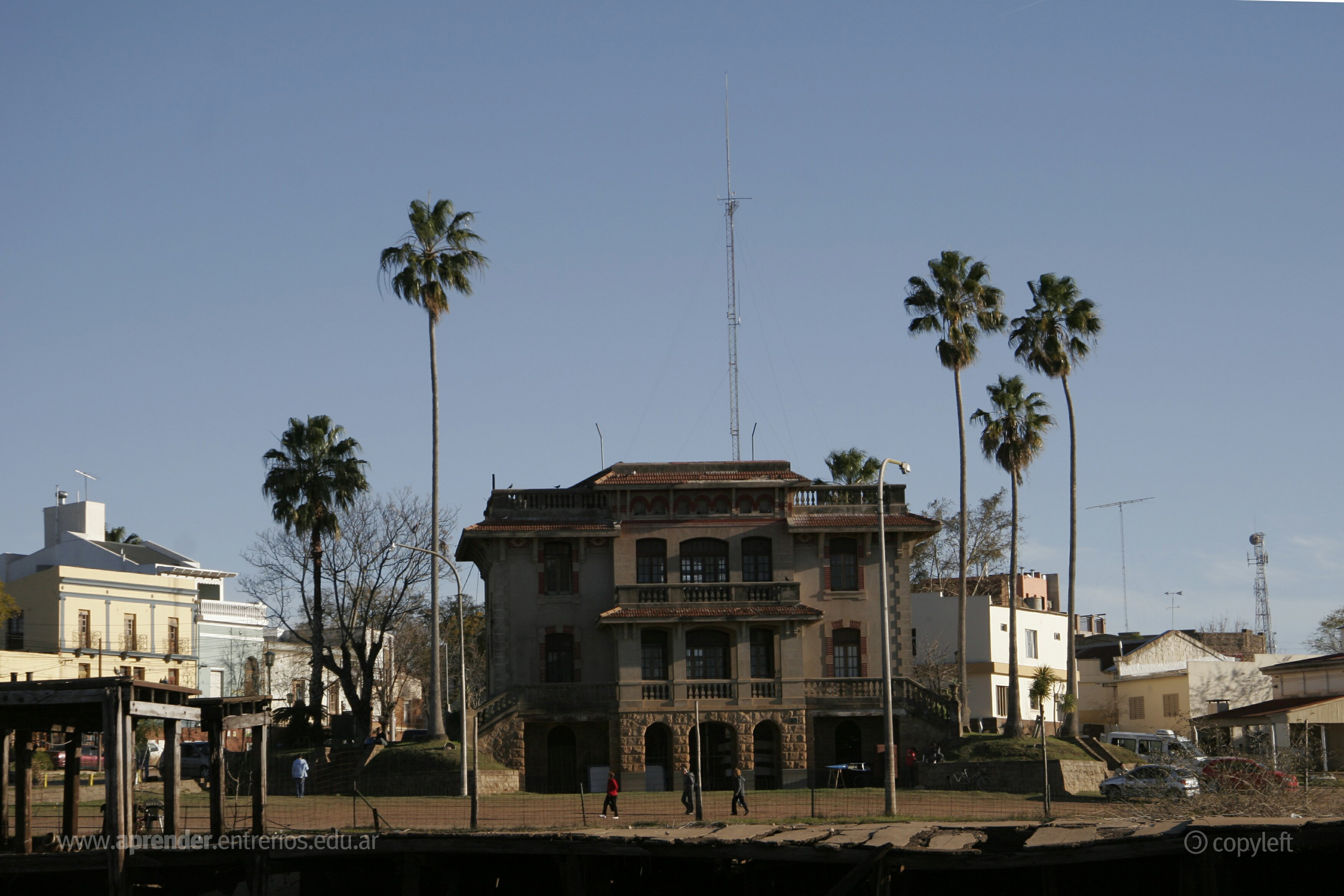
- Tourism Office in the port of the city

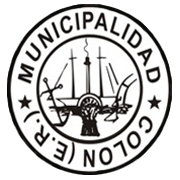
- Coat of arms

- Location of Colón in Argentina
- Coordinates: 32°13′S 58°8′W
- Country: Argentina
- Province: Entre Ríos
- Department: Colón
- Established: 1863
- Founder: Justo José de Urquiza

Government
  - Intendant: José Luis Walser (Vecinalismo-JxER)

Population (2010 census)
  - Total: 23,150
- Time zone: UTC−3 (ART)
- CPA base: E3280
- Dialing code: +54 3447

Colón is a city in the province of Entre Ríos, Argentina. It is located in the east of the province, on the western shore of the Uruguay River, and has about 23,000 inhabitants (2010 census [INDEC]). It lies opposite Paysandú, Uruguay, to which it is linked across the river by the General Artigas Bridge.

The city was founded in 1863 by General Justo José de Urquiza, former caudillo of Entre Ríos and then the first constitutional President of Argentina.

== Overview ==
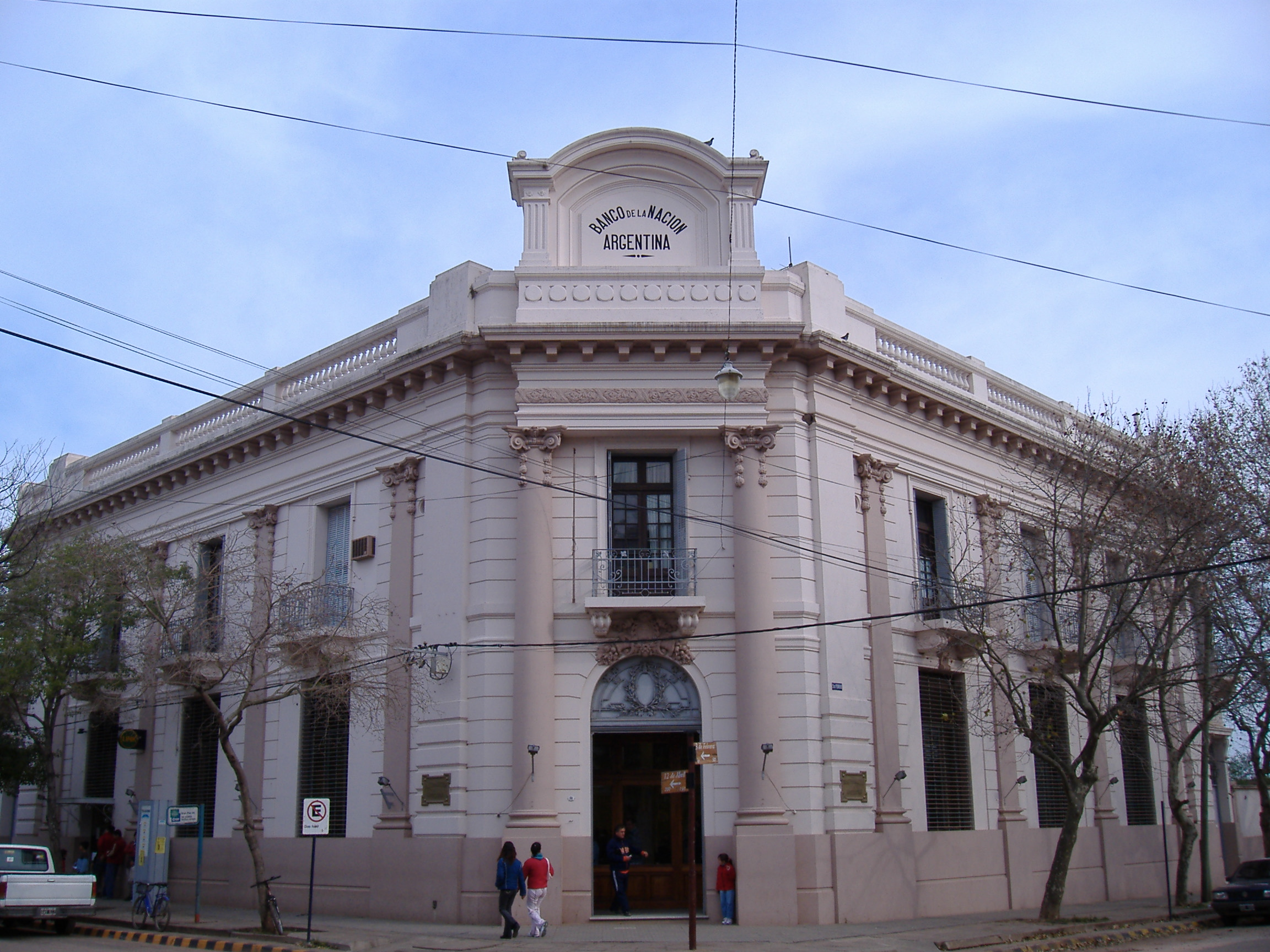
Colón branch of the Argentine National Bank

Colón is the center of an important tourist region. Though it is a relatively small city, it features high-quality hotels, a casino, and camping sites. It also has hot springs and associated facilities. The neighboring towns allow for small-scale historical sightseeing, since they were mostly created as agricultural colonies by European immigrants (especially from Switzerland).

In the Colón area (about 60 km from the city) lies the El Palmar National Park, a large reserve of Yatay palm trees (Syagrus yatay), informally known as Palmar de Colón. The Palacio San José, former country residence of General Urquiza and now a national monument, is also near Colón, closer to the city of Concepción del Uruguay.

== History ==
The city was founded by General Justo José de Urquiza on 12 April 1863. As the city was bordered by the Uruguay River it became a commercial center, trading products that came from neighbor cities of Colonia San José, also founded by Urquiza himself along with Swiss and French immigrants that had arrived in 1857 and were engaged in agriculture and livestock.

As the number of inhabitants increased, Urquiza thought it convenient to establish a new town near the region. Therefore, on 26 August 1871 the creation of "Villa de Colón" was officially promulgated. It was bordered by Arroyo de la Leche, Arroyo del Medio, and Colonia San José. The "San Justo and Pastor" Church was established in 1876. After the reform of the Constitution in 1933, Colón became a first-class municipality.

== Tourism ==
Colón is regarded as the "Provincial Capital of Tourism", due to the large affluence of tourists in the city. It has about 14 km of beach on the Uruguay River that form one of the largest beaches in the province.

The "Parque Quirós" is an elevated park with a large variety of fields to practice several sports such as association football, tennis, basketball, rugby union, among others. It was built by national deputy (and then governor of Entre Ríos) Herminio Quirós as a sports center for the schools of the city.

== Gallery ==
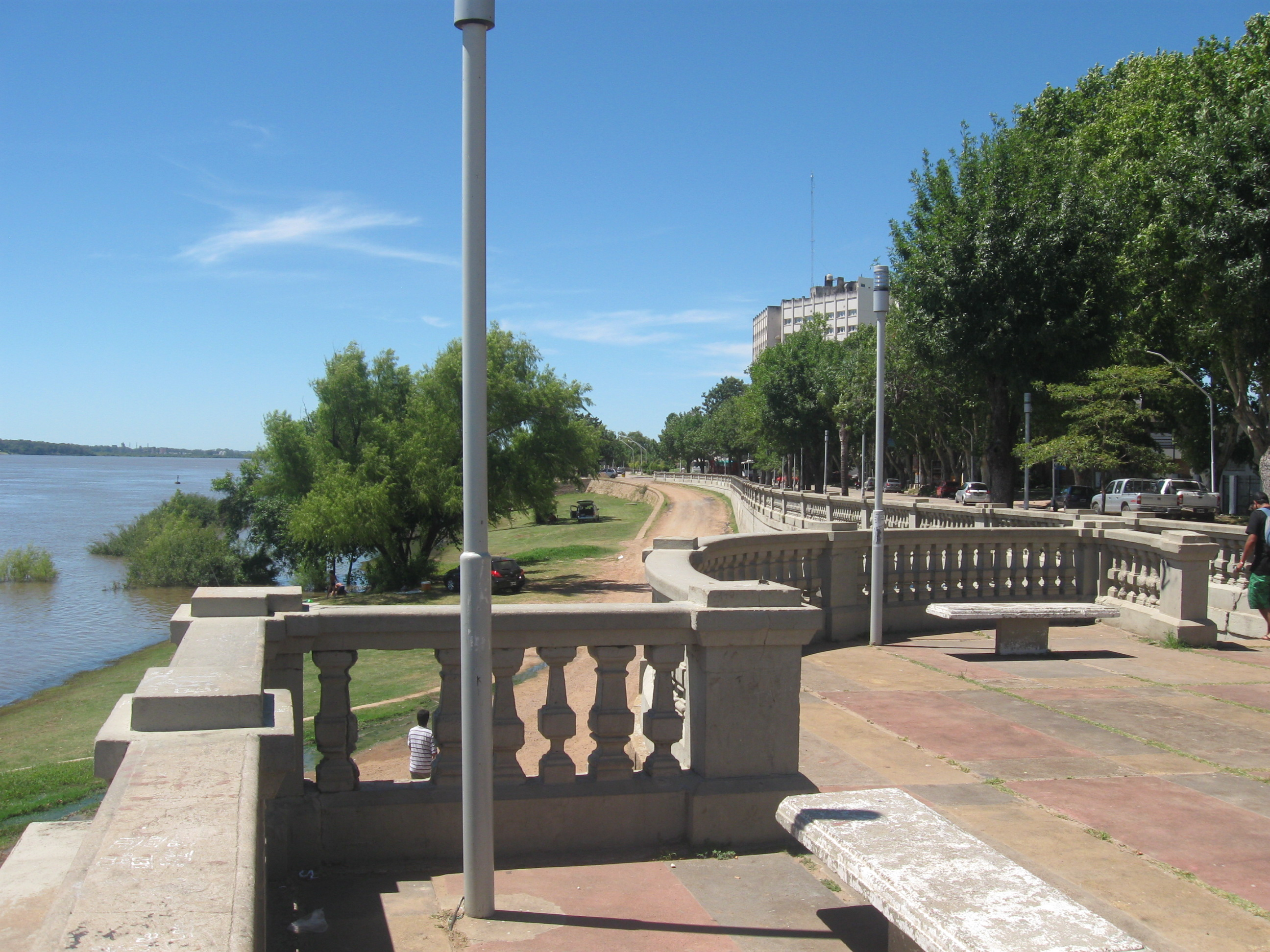
Avenida Costanera

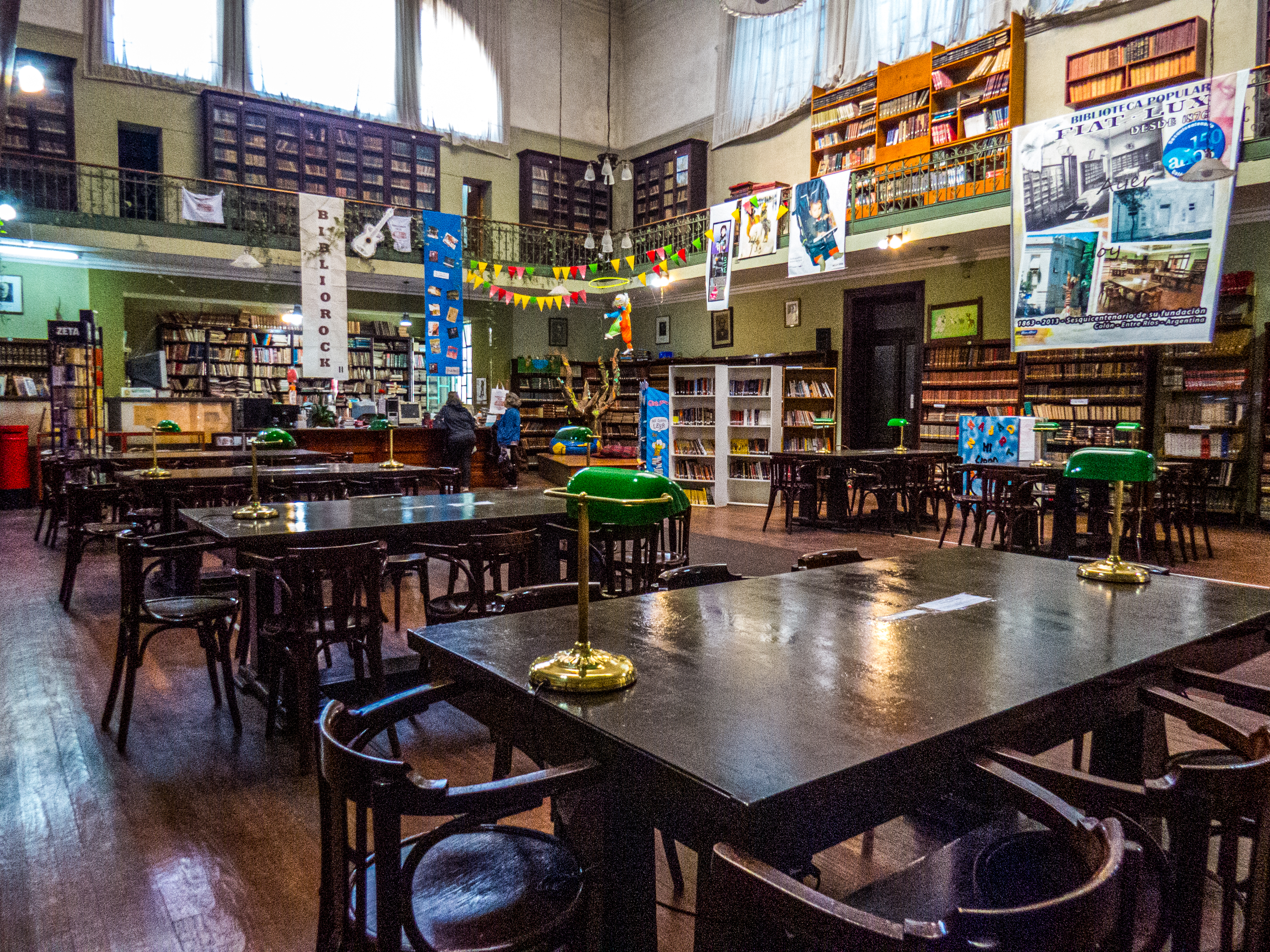
Library

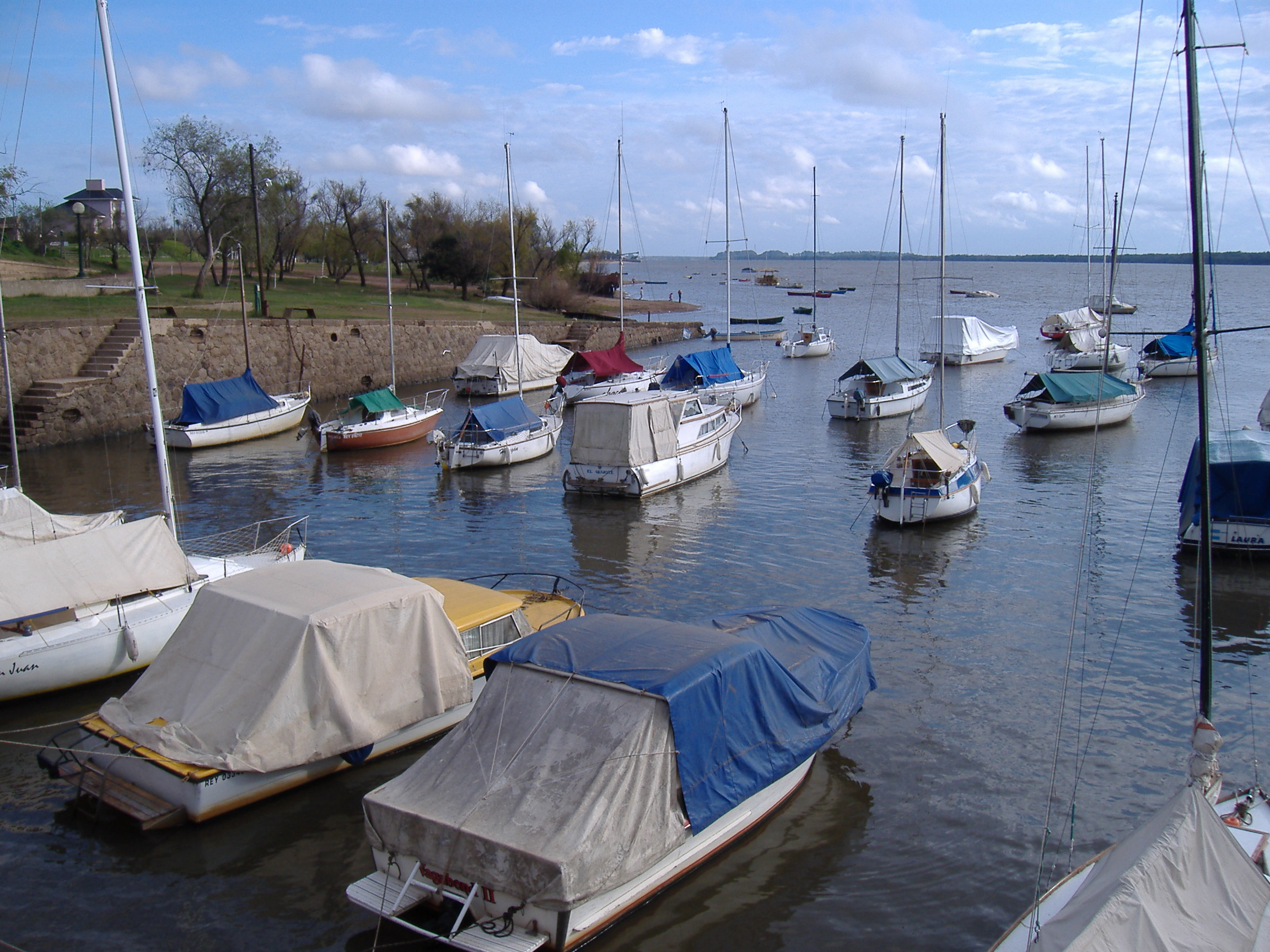
Sailboats at the port

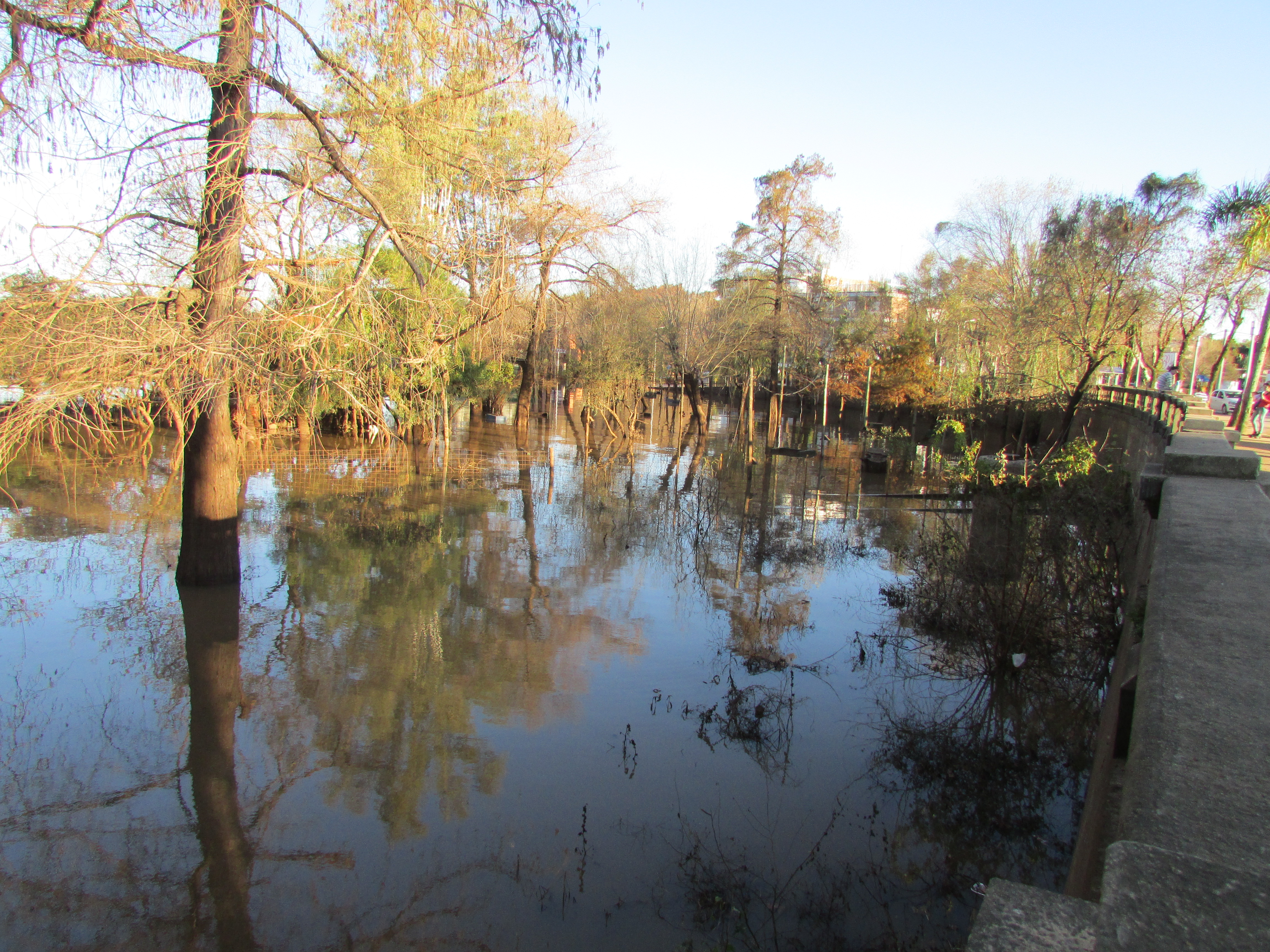
Camping

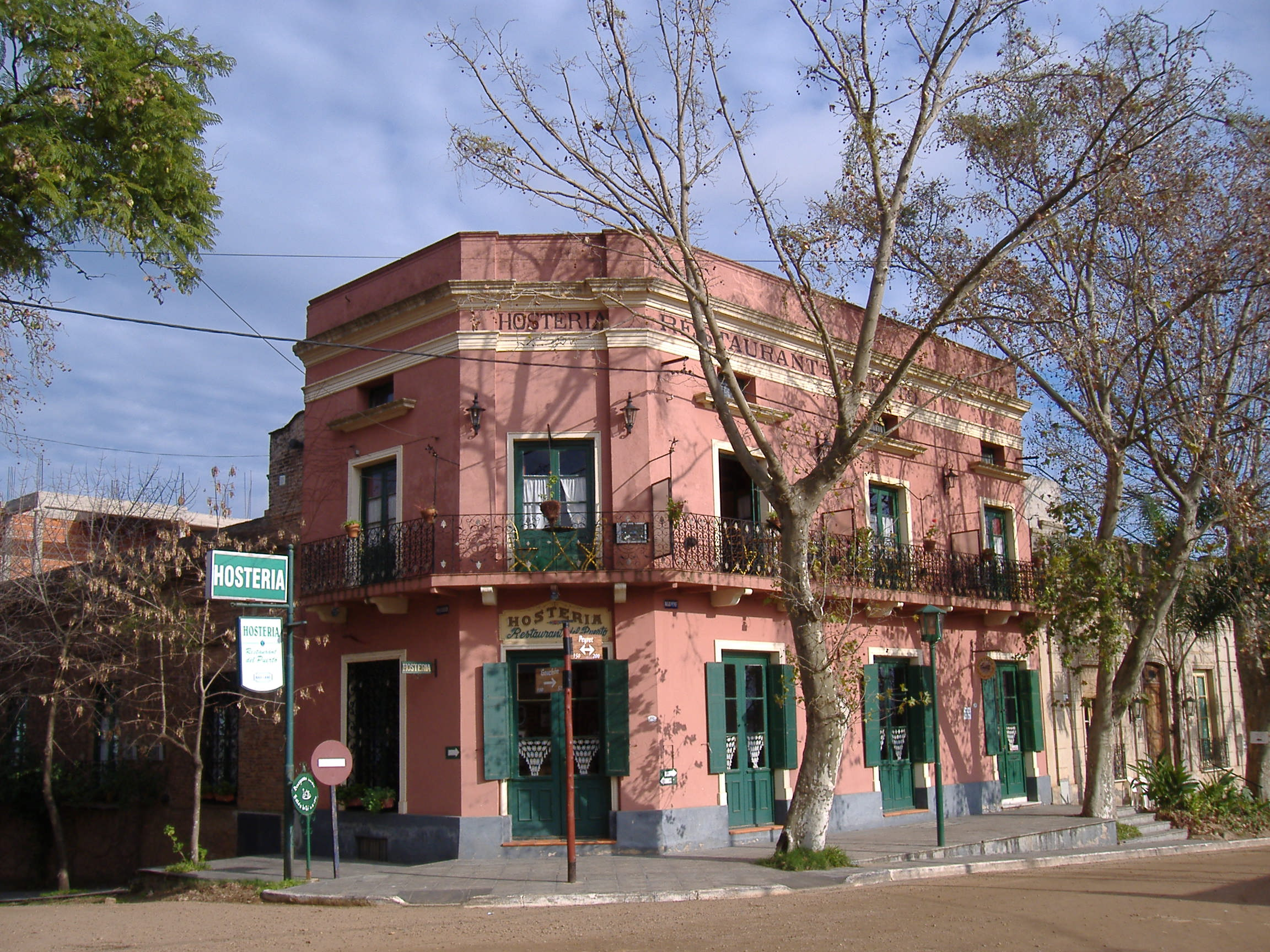
Lodge

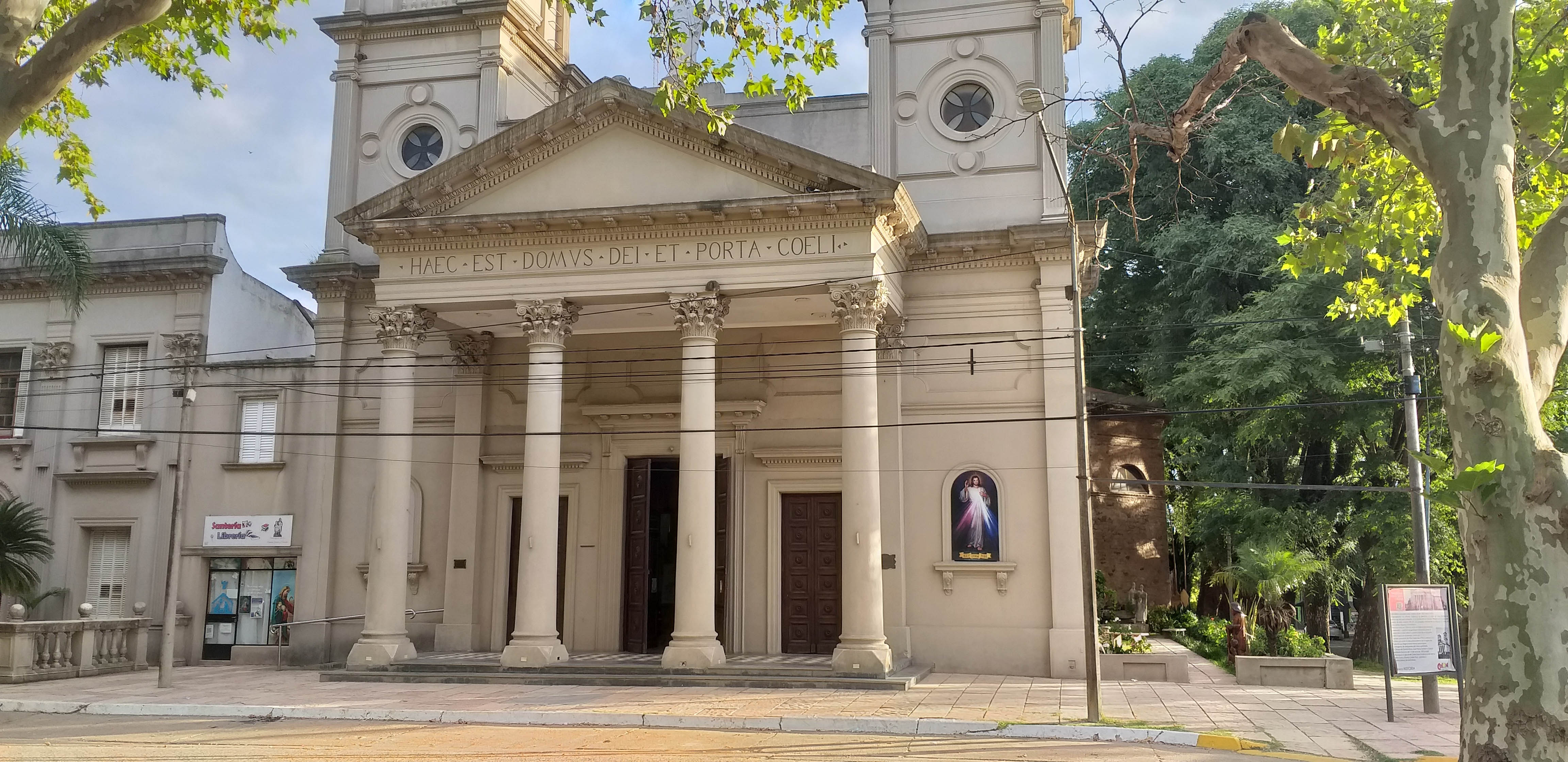
Santos Justo y Pastor Church
