= Villa Domínguez =

Coordinates: 31°59′S 58°58′W

- Municipality and village
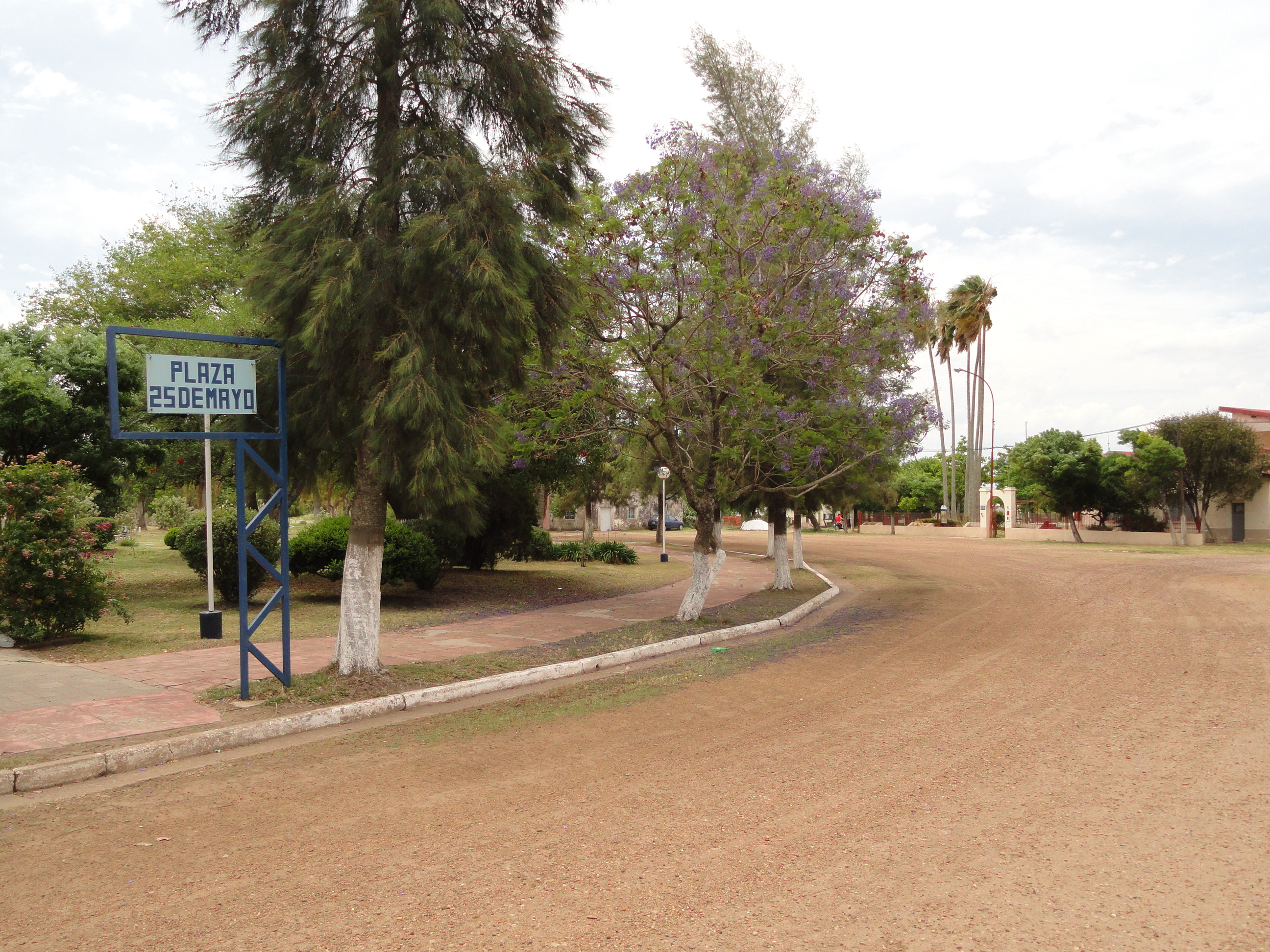
- Villa Domínguez
- Interactive map of Villa Domínguez
- Country: Argentina
- Province: Entre Ríos
- Time zone: UTC−3 (ART)

Villa Domínguez is a village and municipality in Entre Ríos Province in north-eastern Argentina. It was the main settlement of Jews in this province.
