= Jewish gauchos =

Judaism in Argentina

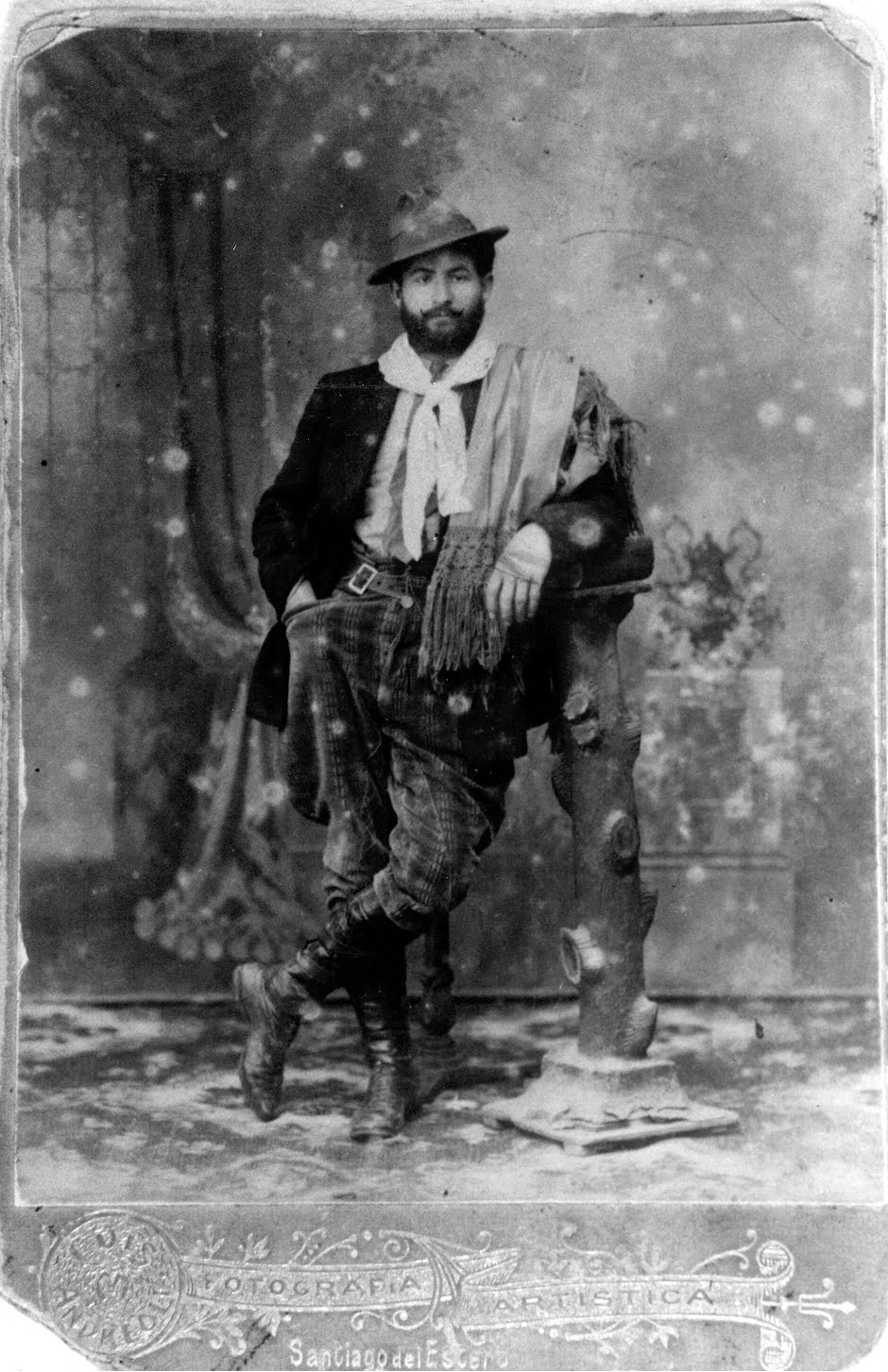
A Jewish gaucho from Moisés Ville, 1909.

Jewish gauchos (Spanish: gauchos judíos, Ladino: gauchos djudíos) were Jewish immigrants who settled in fertile regions of Argentina in agricultural colonies established by the Jewish Colonization Association. The association was established by Baron Maurice de Hirsch, a German-Jewish industrialist who amassed a fortune building railroads in Russia. After the death of his son, Hirsch resolved to help Russia's Jews and bought more than 80,000 hectares (198,000 acres) of land in Argentina. Among these colonies are Colonia Lapin and Rivera in the Province of Buenos Aires and Basavilbaso in Entre Ríos. Most of these immigrants were from Podolia and Bessarabia, in Imperial Russia.

The first eight families arrived in Argentina in October 1888. In August 1889, 824 Jewish immigrants arrived from Russia on the steamer "Weser", and settled in the Moïseville colony (today the town of Moisés Ville) in the province of Santa Fe.

After considerable conflict with native gauchos, the Jewish immigrants came to be reluctantly accepted by them. The colonists also began to pool their resources to buy seeds, and in Basavilbaso in 1900 they founded the Sociedad Agricola Israelita, the first cooperative in Latin America. Today, however, there is little to see of the town's once-thriving Jewish community. The Jewish Center is now a "social club," open to Jews and Gentiles alike. Writing in South American Explorer magazine in 1978, author David Schneider states:

In less than 80 years, thousands of Jews crossed an ocean, settled on the Argentine pampa, reared children, prospered, and moved on, leaving behind weathered and empty synagogues, boarded-up schools, closed libraries.

The Jewish Gauchos have been the subject of several books and films. The Jewish Gauchos of the Pampas, by Alberto Gerchunoff, is a series of vignettes about shtetl life in Argentina first published in 1910 and now available in English. The book was turned into a musical comedy in 1975 titled Jewish Gauchos (Los gauchos judíos in Spanish). The film was directed by Juan José Jusid and starred José Soriano, Gina Maria Hidalgo, and Víctor Laplace. A 2004 documentary, Legacy, took nearly 10 years to complete and involved interviews with many aging "Jewish gauchos."

== See also ==
- Agricultural colonies in Argentina#Jewish migration
- History of the Jews in Argentina
- Immigration in Argentina
- Jewish agricultural colonies in the Russian Empire

== Bibliography ==
- Sinay, Javier (2022). The murders of Moisés Ville: The Rise and Fall of the Jerusalem of South America. Translated by Robert Croll. Brooklyn, New York. ISBN 978-1-63206-298-7 OCLC 1295103711
- Jewish Encyclopedia (1901-1906). Agricultural colonies in the Argentine Republic (Argentina). West Conshohocken: JewishEncyclopedia.com. Accessed: 27 April 2007.
- Jewish Encyclopedia (1901-1906). Jewish Colonization Association. West Conshohocken: JewishEncyclopedia.com. Accessed: 27 April 2007.
- Jewish Encyclopedia (1901-1906). Hirsch, Clara de (Baroness de Hirsch-Gereuth). West Conshohocken: JewishEncyclopedia.com. Accessed: 27 April 2007.
- Jewish Encyclopedia (1901-1906). Hirsch, Baron Maurice de (Moritz Hirsch, Freiherr auf Gereuth). West Conshohocken: JewishEncyclopedia.com. Accessed: 27 April 2007.
