= The Jewish Gauchos =

Argentine novel about Jewish colonization in rural argentina

Los Gauchos Judíos
- Cover to a 2003 edition of the novel
- Author: Alberto Gerchunoff
- Original title: Los Gauchos Judíos
- Language: Spanish
- Publisher: La Nación (first, serial, edition in original Spanish)
- Publication date: 1910
- Publication place: Argentina
- English publication date: 1959
- Media type: Print
- ISBN: 9872074801
- OCLC: 654629860
- Dewey Decimal: A863.01

The Jewish Gauchos, (Los Gauchos Judíos in Spanish, and published in English as The Jewish Gauchos of the Pampas) is a novel of Ukrainian-born Argentine writer and journalist Alberto Gerchunoff, who is regarded as the founder of Jewish literature in Latin America. Gerchunoff published the work in 1910, during the celebrations of Argentina's May Revolution centennial. The Encyclopaedia Judaica states that The Jewish Gauchos is the first Latin American literary piece depicting Jewish immigration to the New World, and the first literary work written in Spanish by a Jewish author in modern times. The novel ranks 35th in the "Jewish Cannon", which lists the best 100 books of modern Jewish Literature.

== Background ==
The first Jewish families arrived in Argentina in October 1888. In August 1889, the Jewish Colonization Association established by Maurice de Hirsch bought lands for Jewish farmers coming from Imperial Russian and Romania, mainly from the regions of Bessarabia and Podolia.

Jewish agricultural settlements were established in the provinces of Buenos Aires (Lapin, Rivera), Entre Ríos (San Gregorio, Villa Domínguez, Carmel, Ingeniero Sajaroff, Villa Clara, and Villaguay), and Santa Fe (Moisés Ville). The national census of 1895 recorded that, of the 6,085 people who identified as Jewish, 3,880 (about 64%) lived in Entre Ríos.

== The novel ==
The Jewish Gauchos was first published in La Nación, in instalments which included originally 24 tales. Another two were added in 1936. The novel, full of autobiographical references from the author's childhood, has been read as a utopic vision of the agrarian life of the Jewish immigrants in Argentina, with a strong resemblance of the biblical "Promised Land", but has also bore criticism from later generations for its "intent to show that the return to agriculture was creating a new harmonious Jew who would enjoy full acceptance in Argentina". Jorge Luis Borges praised Gerchunoff for the oral roots of his narrative. Critic Perla Sneh says that Gerchunoff's mix of Judaeo-Spanish with the traditional gauchoesque dialect created "an improbable Gaucho literature of the exile". She also compares The Jewish Gauchos with Sarmiento's Facundo, in the sense that both works combine narrative, history and politics.

The Jewish Gauchos (Los Gauchos Judíos) was translated to English by Abelard-Schuman as The Jewish Gauchos of the Pampas, first published in 1959. There is a 1975 Argentine film based upon Gerchunoff work, Los Gauchos Judíos, directed by Juan José Jusid and starred José Soriano, Ginamaria Hidalgo and Víctor Laplace.

== See also ==
- History of the Jews in Argentina
- Jewish gauchos
