= Agricultural colonies in Argentina =

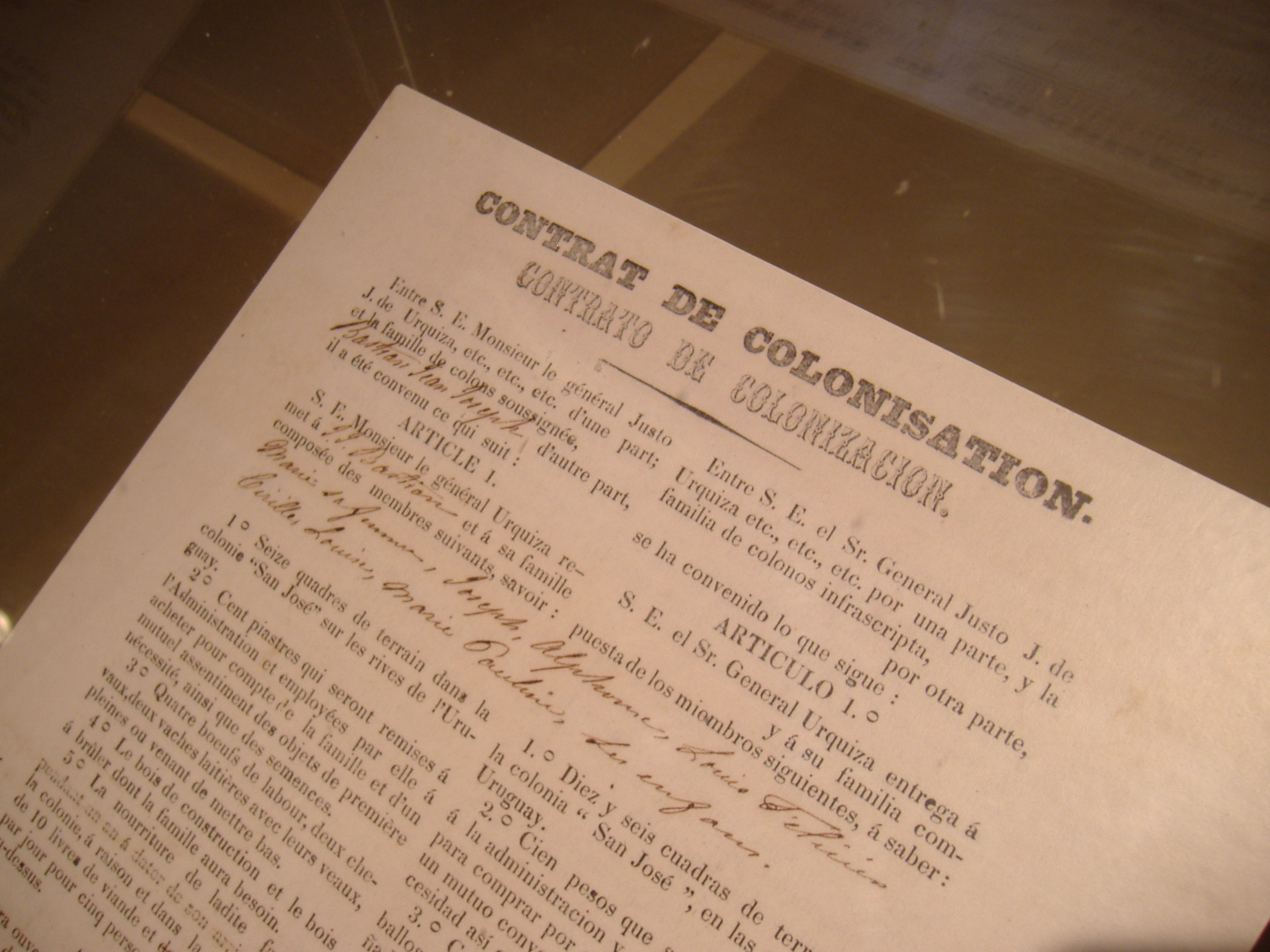
Copy of a colonization contract, in the history museum of San José, Entre Ríos.

Agricultural colonies in Argentina were a demographically and economically important part of the evolution of the country. The Argentine government, faced with large areas of fertile land that were unpopulated or settled by aboriginal tribes (unassimilated and considered undesirable for progress), encouraged European immigration, welcoming settling agreements with countries, regions and associations abroad.

Starting in 1853, President Justo José de Urquiza encouraged the establishment of agricultural colonies in the Littoral region (western Mesopotamia and northeastern Pampas, the area of influence of the Paraná and Uruguay Rivers). The national government signed a contract with an agency led by entrepreneur Aarón Castellanos.

The first immigrants brought by this colonization contract arrived in Rosario, Santa Fe, on March 24, 1854. The first formally organized agricultural colony was Esperanza, Santa Fe, formed by 200 families from Switzerland, Germany, France, Italy, Belgium, and Luxembourg who arrived during January and February 1856.

The production potential of these colonies can be measured by the fact that, in 1874, Argentina had to import wheat, while by 1880 the agricultural colonies were enough to supply the country's internal needs, and at the end of the 19th century, Argentina became a major exporter.

== Jewish migration ==
Many other immigrants were Jews, fleeing pogroms in Europe and sponsored by Maurice de Hirsch's Jewish Colonization Association; they were later termed "Jewish gauchos".

Starting in 1880, Argentine governments had a policy of massive immigration, and the liberal tendencies of the Roca administration were instrumental in making Jews fleeing pogroms in Europe feel welcome. The first such Jewish colony was Moïseville (now the village of Moisés Ville, Santa Fe).

In the 1880s and 1890s, France's Baron Maurice de Hirsch organized a campaign to relocate two-thirds of Jews in the Russian Empire. Argentina was publicized as a destination for Jews: Alberto Gerchunoff, a Russian Jew who migrated to Argentina, recalled seeing print articles about the Jewish migration to Argentina in Tulchin, Russia, in 1889. In 1891, Hirsch established the Jewish Colonization Association to coordinate the purchase of land to accommodate Jewish migrants.

The Jewish population in Argentina grew and prospered in the ensuing years (see History of the Jews in Argentina).

Leon Pinsker, in his book Autoemancipation (1882) and Theodor Herzl, in his book The Jewish State (Der Judenstaat), evaluated Argentina as a potential destination for the oppressed Jews of Eastern Europe.

Some sources maintain that Herzl proposed that the Argentina project be given priority over settlement in Palestine.

The Zionist records attest to the fact that Herzl did consider Argentina, as well as present-day Kenya, as alternatives to Palestine. Also, Israel Zangwill and his Jewish Territorialist Organization (ITO) split off from the main Zionist movement; the territorialists' aim was to establish a Jewish homeland wherever possible. The ITO never gained wide support and was dissolved in 1925, leaving Palestine as the sole focus of Zionist aspirations.
