= Noé Jitrik =

Argentine literary critic (1928–2022)

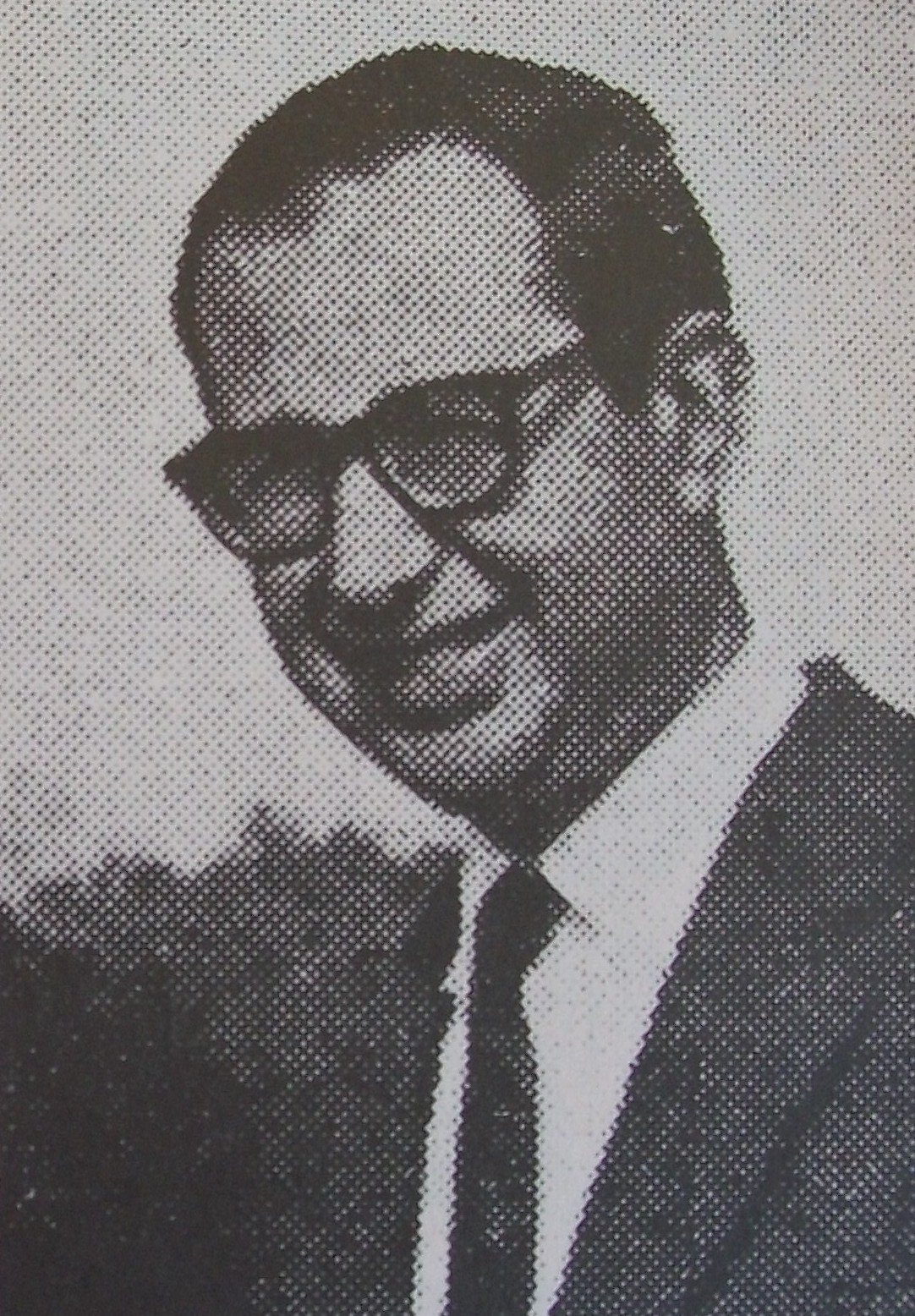
- Jitrik c. 1968
- Born: 23 January 1928; Rivera, Argentina
- Died: 6 October 2022 (aged 94); Pereira, Colombia
- Education: University of Buenos Aires
- Occupations: Literary critic; writer; professor

Noé Jitrik (23 January 1928 – 6 October 2022) was an Argentine literary critic, writer, and professor.

== Biography ==
Jitrik was born in Rivera. While studying at the University of Buenos Aires in the 1950s he became involved with the cultural journal Contorno, where he published his first articles and was a member of its editorial board in 1958–1959. Jitrik then devoted himself to teaching: first at the National University of Córdoba in 1960–1966, and then at the University of Buenos Aires for a few months in 1966, before his career was interrupted by the dictatorship of Juan Carlos Onganía.^{:VII–VIII}

From 1967 to 1970 Jitrik taught at the University of Franche-Comté in Besançon, France. After a brief return to Argentina and the University of Buenos Aires, he again went into exile in 1974 after facing threats from the Argentine Anticommunist Alliance. Settling in Mexico, Jitrik taught at the Colegio de México in 1974–1980, and at the National Autonomous University of Mexico in 1981–1992.^{:VIII}

From 1987 Jitrik divided his time between Mexico and Buenos Aires.^{:VIII} In 1990 he was named director of the Instituto de Literatura Hispanoamericana at the University of Buenos Aires, a position he would hold until his death. In addition, Jitrik taught as a visiting professor at several universities in Argentina, Mexico, the United States (Indiana University and the University of California, Irvine), Puerto Rico, France, and Venezuela.^{:VIII}

Jitrik died following a stroke in Pereira, Colombia at the age of 94.

== Work ==
In several of his works from the 1960s, such as the collection of essays Escritores argentinos, dependencia o libertad ("Argentine Writers: Dependency or Freedom", 1967) and the anthology on the Generation of 1880 (1968), Jitrik sought to make use of models from dependency theory and Marxist analysis. In the 1970s he would combine these methods with an engagement with French structuralism and semiotics, for example in Producción literaria y producción social ("Literary Production and Social Production", 1975).^{:IX}

Jitrik's theoretical works include Procedimiento y mensaje en la novela ("Process and Message of the Novel", 1962), on narration; El no existente caballero ("The Non-Existent Gentleman", 1975), on fictional character; La lectura como actividad ("Reading as Activity", 1982) and Lectura y cultura ("Reading and Culture", 1987), on reading; Temas de teoría: el trabajo crítico y la teoría literaria ("Theoretical Topics: Critical Work and Literary Theory", 1987), on criticism; Historia e imaginación literaria ("History and Literary Imagination", 1995), on the historical novel, and Los grados de la escritura ("Degrees of Writing", 2000), a collection of semiotic reflections on the act of writing, drawing on concepts such as corrections, drafts, beginnings, developments, and endings. Aside from his work as a critic, Jitrik also wrote more than a dozen volumes of poetry and fiction.^{:X}

While originally enamored of the work of Jorge Luis Borges, he became convinced that Borges had nothing new to write after the publication of El hacedor in 1960. His feelings towards Borges gradually became what he could only term "complex" in an article published in Les Temps Modernes in 1981.

== Honours and awards (selected) ==
- Xavier Villaurrutia Award, Mexico, 1981, for the novel Fin del ritual
- Knight of the Order of Arts and Letters, France, 1993
- Honorary member of the Modern Language Association of America, USA, 1999
- Corresponding member of the Academia Mexicana de la Lengua, Mexico, 2021

== Bibliography (selected) ==
=== Critical texts ===
- Leopoldo Lugones, mito nacional (Buenos Aires: Palestra, 1960)
- Horacio Quiroga. Una obra de experiencia y riesgo (Buenos Aires: Ediciones Culturales Argentinas, 1960. Second revised edition: Montevideo: Arca, 1967)
- Procedimiento y mensaje en la novela (Córdoba: Universidad Nacional de Córdoba, 1962)
- Escritores argentinos, dependencia o libertad (Buenos Aires: Ediciones del Candil, 1967)
- Esteban Echeverría (Buenos Aires: CEAL, 1967)
- Horacio Quiroga (Buenos Aires: CEAL, 1967)
- Muerte y resurrección de «Facundo» (Buenos Aires: CEAL, 1968)
- El 80 y su mundo (Buenos Aires: Jorge Álvarez, 1968. Second edition: El mundo del ochenta, Buenos Aires: CEAL, 1982)
- Tres ensayos sobre Esteban Echeverría (Besançon: Faculté des Lettres, Université de Besançon, 1969)
- José Hernández (Buenos Aires: CEAL, 1971)
- Sarmiento (Buenos Aires: CEAL, 1971)
- José Martí (Buenos Aires: CEAL, 1971)
- Ensayos y estudios de literatura argentina (Buenos Aires: Galerna, 1971)
- El fuego de la especie (Buenos Aires: Siglo XXI, 1971)
- La novela futura de Macedonio Fernández (Caracas: Biblioteca de la Universidad Central, 1973)
- Producción literaria y producción social (Buenos Aires: Sudamericana, 1975)
- El no existente caballero: la idea de personaje y su evolución en la narrativa latinoamericana (Buenos Aires: Megápolis, 1975)
- Las contradicciones del modernismo (México: El Colegio de México, 1978)
- La memoria compartida (México: Editorial Veracruzana, 1982. Second edition: Buenos Aires: CEAL, 1987)
- La lectura como actividad (México: Premià, 1982)
- Los dos ejes de la cruz (Puebla: Universidad Autónoma de Puebla, 1983)
- Las armas y las razones (Buenos Aires: Sudamericana, 1984)
- La vibración del presente (México: Fondo de Cultura Económica, 1987)
- Cuando leer es hacer (Santa Fe: Universidad Nacional del Litoral, 1987)
- Temas de teoría. El trabajo crítico y la crítica literaria (México: Premiá, 1987)
- Lectura y cultura (México: Dirección de Fomento Editorial-UNAM, 1987)
- El balcón barroco (México: UNAM, 1988)
- Historia de una mirada (México: UNAM-El Equilibrista, 1992)
- La selva luminosa. Ensayos críticos (1987–1991) (Buenos Aires: Facultad de Filosofía y Letras, 1993)
- Historia e imaginación literaria (Buenos Aires: Biblos, 1995)
- Suspender toda certeza. Antología crítica (1959–1976) (Buenos Aires: Biblos, 1997)
- El ejemplo de la familia. Ensayos y trabajos sobre literatura argentina (Buenos Aires: Eudeba, 1998)

=== Fiction ===
- Addio a la mamma, Fiesta en casa, y otros poemas (Buenos Aires: Zona, 1965)
- Llamar antes de entrar (Caracas: Síntesis 2000, 1972)
- Comer y comer (Buenos Aires: Ediciones de la Flor, 1974)
- Del otro lado de la puerta: rapsodia (Buenos Aires: Megápolis, 1974)
- Limbo (México: Ediciones Era, 1989)
- Citas de un día (Buenos Aires: Alfaguara, 1992)
- Mares del sur (Buenos Aires: Tusquets, 1997)
