= The Jewish Gauchos (film) =

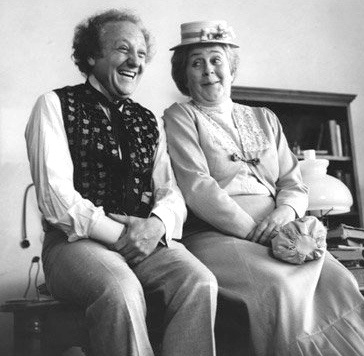
- Pepe Soriano and China Zorrilla in "Los Gauchos judíos"
- Spanish: Los Gauchos judíos
- Directed by: Juan José Jusid
- Written by: Alberto Gerchunoff
- Starring: Pepe Soriano; China Zorrilla
- Cinematography: Juan Carlos Desanzo
- Edited by: Miguel Pérez
- Distributed by: Film Cuatro
- Release date: 1975
- Running time: 110 min.
- Country: Argentina
- Language: Spanish

The Jewish Gauchos (Spanish: Los Gauchos judíos) is a 1975 Argentine film based on the novel Los Gauchos Judíos (The Jewish Gauchos of the Pampas in its English version) by journalist and writer Alberto Gerchunoff. The story centers on a large group of Jews who escaped from Imperial Russia to Argentina to start a new life near the eastern border of Entre Rios province at the beginning of the 19th century.

== Cast ==
- Pepe Soriano
- Luisina Brando
- China Zorrilla
- Víctor Laplace
- María Rosa Gallo
- Ginamaría Hidalgo
- Raúl Lavié
- Osvaldo Terranova
- Dora Baret

== See also ==
- The Jewish Gauchos
- Jewish gauchos
