= Danny MacAskill =

Scottish trials cyclist

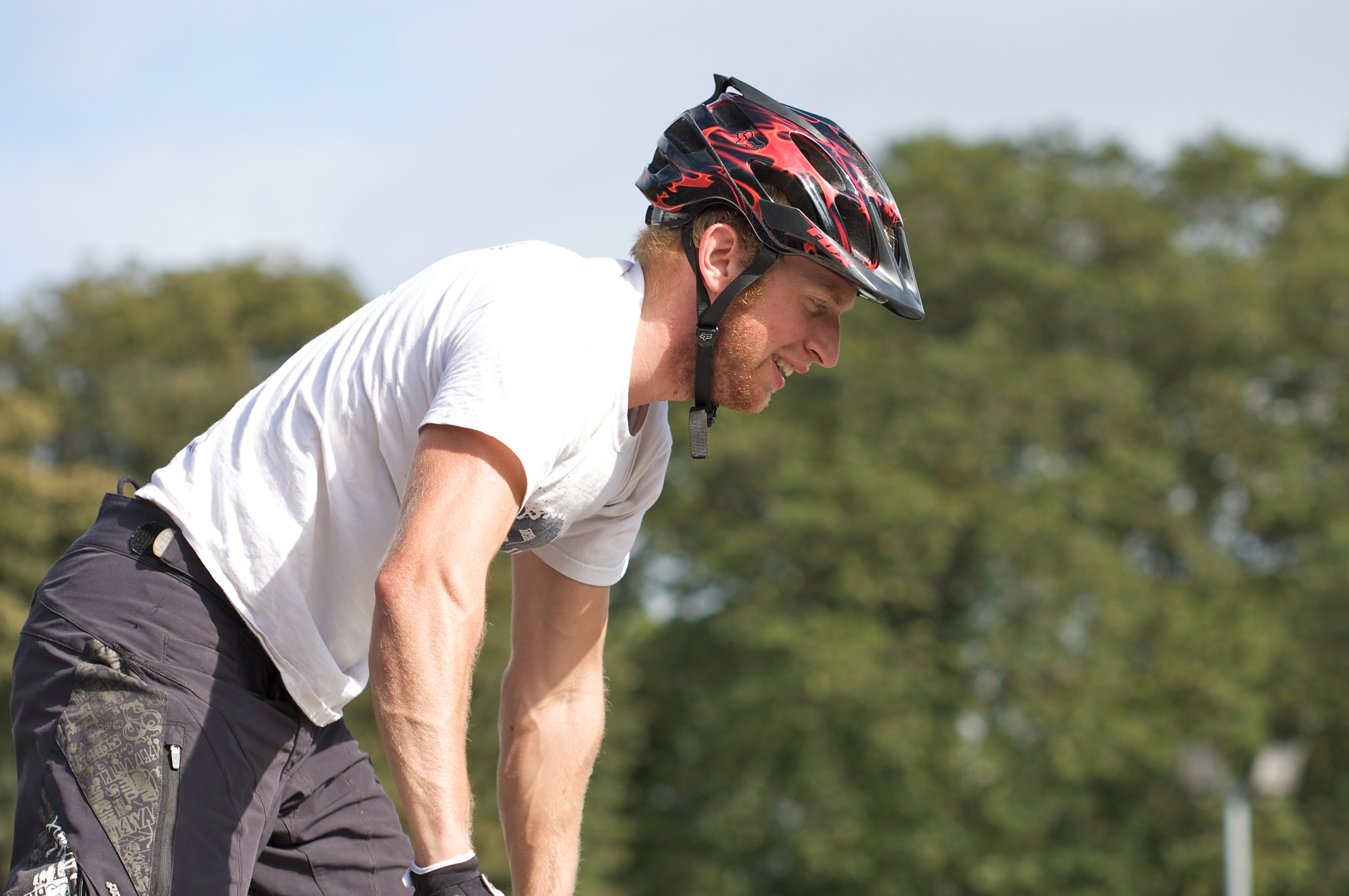
- MacAskill in 2009

Personal information
- Full name: Daniel MacAskill
- Born: 23 December 1985 (age 40) Skye, Scotland
- Height: 1.76 m (5 ft 9 in)

Cycling career
- Sport: Cycling
- Current team: Santa Cruz Bicycles
- Discipline: Trials
- Role: Rider
- Rider type: Street Trials

Daniel MacAskill (born 23 December 1985) is a Scottish trials cyclist, from Dunvegan on the Isle of Skye. He works professionally as a street trials and mountain bike rider for Santa Cruz Bicycles. His YouTube channel has more than half a million subscribers and the San Francisco Chronicle called him "one of the most exciting street-riding mountain bikers on Earth."

== Life and career ==
In April 2009, he released a five-minute street trials video to YouTube, filmed by his flatmate Dave Sowerby. This video gained widespread media attention, featuring stunts performed by MacAskill set to "The Funeral" by Band of Horses.

As of April 2009, MacAskill had been practicing several hours per day for more than 12 years. He gave up his job as a mechanic so he could ride full-time and now lives in Glasgow. In June 2009, MacAskill appeared in the music video for Doves' single "Winter Hill".

In September 2009, MacAskill was the focus of a TV advert filmed by The Leith Agency on behalf of Scottish jobs website s1jobs.com.

On 16 November 2010, MacAskill released a new video Way Back Home produced by Red Bull Media House. The video showcases locations around Scotland including Edinburgh Castle, North Berwick, wartime bunkers on the island of Inchgarvie beneath the Forth Bridge and the Cruachan Dam in the Scottish Highlands. In May 2011, Leica Camera released a Go Play promotional video featuring him doing tricks in the city of Cape Town. On 9 August 2011, Cut Media released a video named Industrial Revolutions directed by Stu Thomson. The video, set to "The Wolves" by Ben Howard, features MacAskill doing tricks in an abandoned Scottish iron works. It was created for Mike Christie's Channel 4 documentary Concrete Circus.

In 2011, MacAskill, along with Inspired Bicycles, released his signature trials frame, the "Inspired Skye".

In 2012, MacAskill performed the stunts for the movie Premium Rush. MacAskill is currently managed by the German agency Rasoulution.

In early May 2013, MacAskill was invited to Taichung, Taiwan by a sponsorship partner, Lezyne, to film a riding video titled Danny MacAskill in Taiwan - powered by Lezyne. In summer 2013, MacAskill published a trial biking project on YouTube called Imaginate which had been shot over 18 months produced by Mike Christie for Red Bull Media House and directed by Stu Thomson. In fewer than three weeks, the video had received over four million views. In May 2014, MacAskill released another video through Red Bull Media House called Epecuen, which was shot on location in Epecuén, Argentina. The town has been submerged underwater since 1985 for most of the time, and the video opens with its only resident speaking about it. As of August 2025, the video has accumulated over 90 million views.

In October 2014, MacAskill and long-term collaborator Stu Thomson of Cut Media released a film titled The Ridge. It was filmed on his home island, the Isle of Skye, along the steep and rocky Cuillin Ridge. In the first five days, the video on YouTube garnered over 10 million views. The film was accompanied by a BBC Scotland programme Riding the Ridge that documented Danny and the Cut Media crew as they created the viral film. Cascadia, also produced by Cut Media, appeared in November 2015.

The video "Danny Macaskill's Gymnasium" was released on 7 January 2020, featuring "I'm on My Way" by The Proclaimers.

In January 2021, Macaskill released the video Danny MacAskill - The Slabs, featuring him riding down a 500-metre section of the remote Dubh Slabs which rise out from Loch Coruisk on the Isle of Skye, Scotland. The video was filmed in September 2020 when Scotland's COVID-19 restrictions were temporarily eased and was released with the song "No Cars Go" by Arcade Fire. The video gained over a million views within two days of being released. MacAskill competed in X-Games MTB Real series where his video went viral for his unique tricks.

== Filmography ==
| Date | Title | Location | Notes |
|---|---|---|---|
| April 2009 | Inspired Bicycles - Danny MacAskill April 2009 | Edinburgh | Music: 'The Funeral,' Band of Horses |
| June 2009 | Winter Hill | | music video for the single by Doves |
| September 2009 | s1jobs | Glasgow | Soundtrack: "Barriers" by Aereogramme |
| November 2010 | Way Back Home | Scotland | Music: "Wax and Wire" by Loch Lomond & "A Little Piece" by The Jezabels |
| August 2011 | Industrial Revolutions | Scotland | |
| August 2011 | POC Bike Excursion | Sweden | with Daniel Dhers and Martin Söderström |
| October 2012 | Danny MacAskill Takes To The Track With Sir Chris Hoy | Glasgow | |
| June 2013 | Imaginate | Old Glasgow Transport Museum | |
| August 2013 | Danny MacAskill in Taiwan | Taichung, Taiwan | |
| December 2013 | Road Bike Party 2 | | A collaboration with the Global Cycling Network also featuring Martyn Ashton and Chris Akrigg. |
| May 2014 | Epecuen | Epecuén, Argentina | |
| July 2014 | Danny MacAskill at the Playboy Mansion | Playboy Mansion, Los Angeles, United States | |
| October 2014 | The Ridge | Cuillin ridge, Skye | |
| November 2014 | Cortana | The river Thames, London | Promo stunt for microsofts Cortana |
| November 2015 | This is Drop and Roll | | |
| December 2015 | Cascadia | Gran Canaria | |
| May 2016 | Aviemore Spring | Aviemore | |
| October 2016 | Wee Day Out | Scotland | Riding a mountain bike. Soundtrack: "National Express" by The Divine Comedy. |
| April 2018 | Danny MacAskill & Claudio Caluori: Home of Trails | Switzerland | |
| May 2019 | Danny Daycare | Scotland | Soundtrack: "Hitchin' a Ride" by Vanity Fare |
| January 2020 | Danny MacAskill's Gymnasium | Glasgow | Soundtrack: "I'm On My Way" by The Proclaimers |
| January 2021 | The Slabs | Skye | Soundtrack: "No Cars Go" by Arcade Fire |
| November 2022 | Danny MacAskill: Postcard from San Francisco | San Francisco | |
