= Villa Epecuén =

Abandoned tourist village in Argentina

- Abandoned village
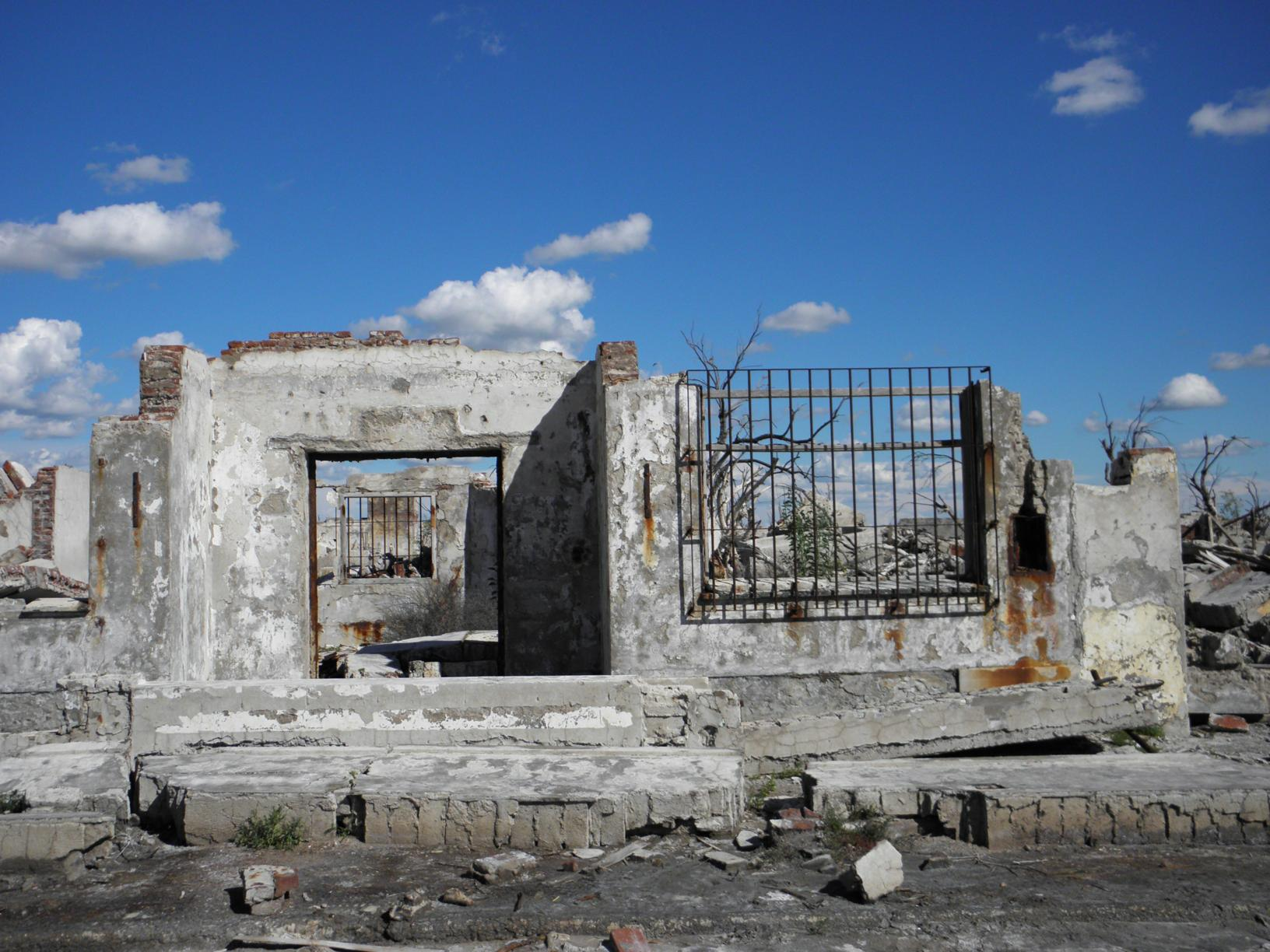
- Ruins of the town

- Coordinates: 37°7′51″S 62°48′27″W
- Country: Argentina
- Province: Buenos Aires
- Partido: Adolfo Alsina
- Founded: 1920
- Elevation: 97 m (318 ft)

Population (22 January 2024)
  - Total: 0

Villa Epecuén is an abandoned tourist village in Buenos Aires Province, Argentina, on the eastern shore of Laguna Epecuén, about 7 kilometres (4.3 mi) north of the city of Carhué. Developed in the early 1920s, Epecuén was accessible from Buenos Aires by train and therefore a popular tourist destination for the city's residents. The Sarmiento Railway line served Villa Epecuén station, while the Midland Railway and the Buenos Aires Great Southern Railway carried passengers to nearby Carhué station. Tourism was developed by an Englishman after taking the land on lease. He marketed the lake as having healing properties, hiring Italian scientists to bolster the claim. At its height, Villa Epecuén could accommodate at least 5,000 visitors.

On 6 November 1985, a seiche, caused by a rare weather pattern, broke a nearby dam, and then the dike protecting the village; the water rose progressively, reaching a peak of 10 metres (33 ft). The village became uninhabitable and was never rebuilt. Many of the ruins are covered by a layer of white and grey salt. At the time, there were up to 280 businesses in Epecuén, including lodges, guesthouses, hotels, and businesses that 25,000 tourists visited between November and March, from the 1950s to the 1970s.

The town reached a population of 1,500 inhabitants at its peak. Until 2024 it had one resident, Pablo Novak, born in 1930, who returned to his home in 2009 when the waters receded after covering the town for 25 years. Pablo's Villa, a 2013 documentary, chronicles the life of the town and of Novak. He remained living in the ruins of Epecuén until his death on 22 January 2024, after which Villa Epecuén was officially declared a deserted village.

The town has been featured in the TV shows Abandoned Engineering (season 4, episode 1), Mysteries of the Abandoned (season 4, episode 1), and What on Earth? (Season 4, episode 4). It was used as a location in the 2010 film And Soon the Darkness, starring Amber Heard and Karl Urban. The city features as the backdrop to one of Danny MacAskill's street trials cycling videos.
