= Mika Feldman de Etchebéhère =

Argentine militant anarchist and Marxist

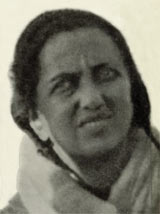
Mika Etchebehere

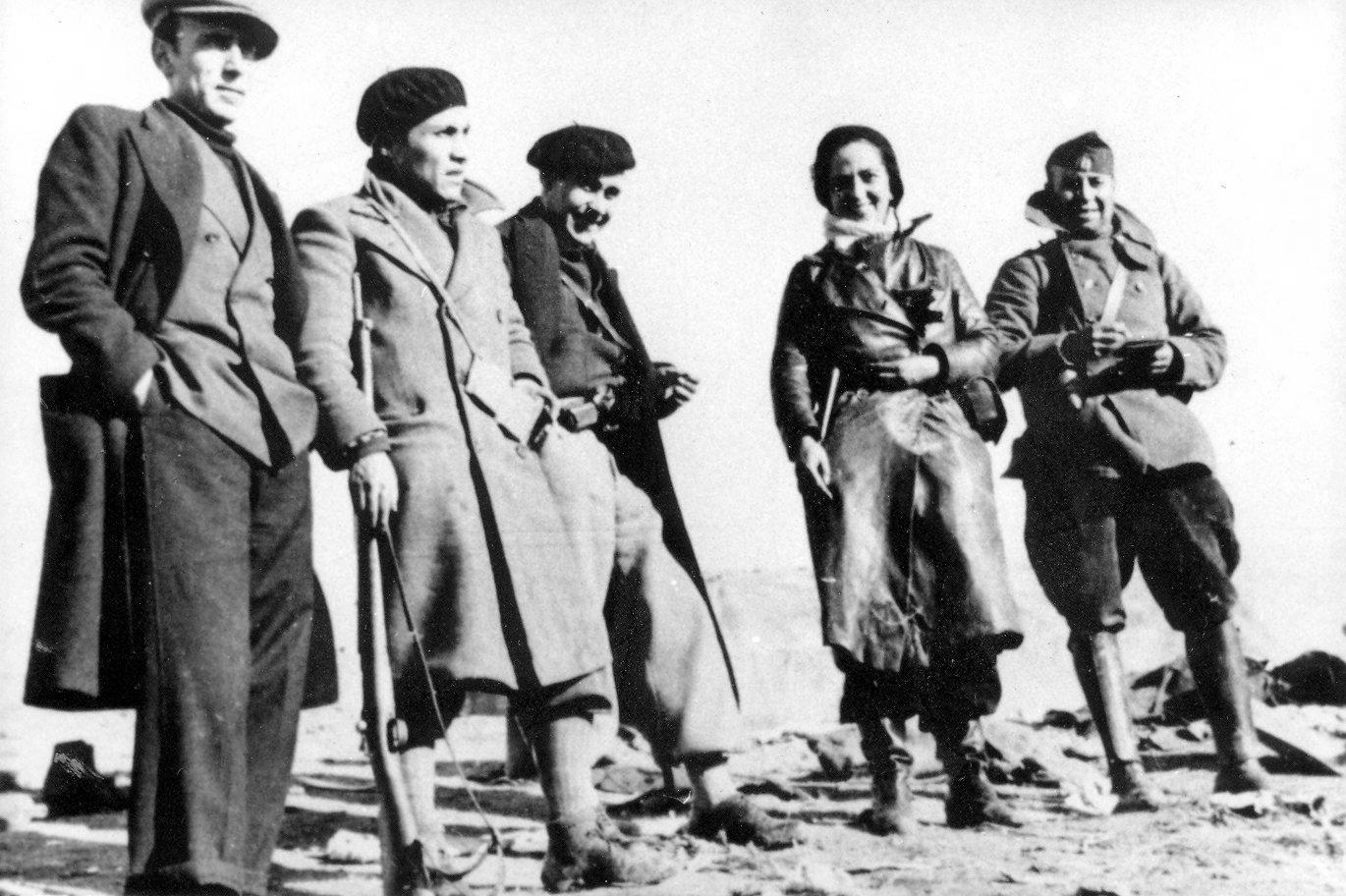
Mika Etchebehere (1936)

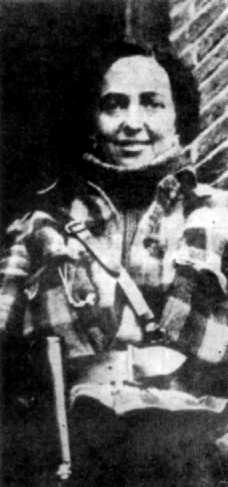
Mika Etchebehere (1937-38)

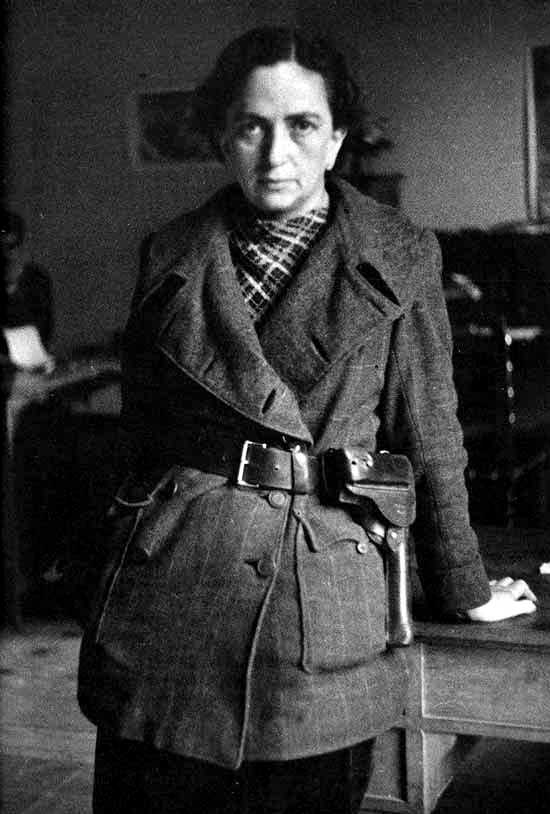
Mika Etchebéhère

Mika Feldman de Etchebéhère (née Micaela Feldman; Moisés Ville, Santa Fe Province, 14 March 1902 — Paris, 7 July 1992) was an Argentine militant anarchist and Marxist. She served as captain of the POUM militia during the Spanish Civil War in 1936, and was also active in the anarcha-feminist organization, Mujeres Libres.

== Life ==
Mika was born in 1902, in Moisés Ville, a small colony founded in 1889 in the province of Santa Fe, in Argentina, by Russian and Eastern-European Jews fleeing persecutions and pogroms. Her father taught Yiddish in Moisés Ville, before moving to Rosario, where he opened a small restaurant. As a child, Mika allegedly heard many stories about Russian revolutionary fighters escaping tsarist prisons.

At age 15, she began being an active member of Rosario's local anarchist organization. Along with Eva Vives, Joan Pauna and other fellow activists, she created a group named after Louise Michel, the famous anarchist figure of the French commune.

In 1920, while studying odontology at the University of Buenos Aires, she met her partner-to-be, Hipólito Etchebéhère, then a member of an anarcho-communist group called "Insurrexit".

In 1924, inspired by the Russian Revolution, the couple decided to join the Communist Party of Argentina, before quickly being expelled in 1925 for their anarchist tendencies, and their refusal to unilaterally condemn Leon Trotsky.

In 1926, she took part in the creation of a Workers' Communist Party, which started publishing a newspaper, La Chispa ("the Spark"). Members of this Trotskyist, anti-Bolshevik group were thus called "Chispistas". The group eventually disbanded in 1929.

Mika then traveled to Patagonia in order to gather the stories of first-hand witnesses of the massacre perpetrated in the early 1920s by the Argentine Army during what has been called "Patagonia Rebelde".

In 1930, Mika and her partner sailed to Europe. First, in June, they spent time in the freshly founded Second Spanish Republic, before going to France. In October 1932, Mika was in Berlin to witness Adolf Hitler's rise to power, which she described as "a tragedy for the German proletariat".

In 1934, as she had returned to Paris, she and Hipólito took part in creating yet another newspaper, Que faire ?, also known for its communist and anti-Stalinist views.

=== Spanish Revolution ===
On 12 July 1936, six days before the Spanish coup of July 1936, Mika was back in Madrid. She and her partner volunteered as fighters for the Workers' Party of Marxist Unification (POUM). Hipólito became the commander of his division. On 16 August 1936, he was shot and killed during the Battle of Sigüenza.

After Hipólito's death, Mika was given his revolver. She briefly considered committing suicide but decided instead to continue fighting for the revolution. She was eventually elected as the head of her fighting division despite the skeptical attitude of some of her male co-fighters. She fought in the siege of Siguenza and escaped from the cathedral before it was overtaken by the fascists. By the end of 1936, she joined another military brigade stationed in Madrid, which was violently decimated. She thus became captain of the 14th division of the Spanish Republican Army, founded on 10 February 1937 by Cipriano Mera. During this time she participated in the creation of libraries and schools for the soldiers on the front lines.

During the May Days of 1937 in Barcelona, she was arrested on the front line at Guadalajara by stalinist communist agents. Having been jailed in Madrid, she was liberated thanks to Cipriano Mera's direct intervention. Once liberated, she joined the anarcho-feminist group known as the Mujeres Libres. She fought on the front line until June 1938. After that date, women were sent away from the front.

She then gave alphabetization classes and popular education in Madrid, in a hospital run by the Confederación Nacional del Trabajo. In the meantime, she was still taking part in activities led by the Mujeres Libres. On 28 March 1939, once Madrid had been defeated by the troops of Franco, she was able to take refuge in the city's French school, thanks to her passport, before leaving Spain for Paris.

However, at the beginning of World War II, fearing the rising danger of antisemitism, she left Europe and went back to her family in Argentina.

=== After World War II ===
As early as 1946, Mika returned to France, becoming a translator for Air France, and helping in creating the Cercle Zimmerwald, a socialist organization.

Years later, during the civil unrest of May 68, a 66-year-old Mika distributed white gloves to student protesters, so they could easily dig out and use the cobblestones of the streets of Paris to build barricades, without having to fear policemen, who would arrest students with dirt-covered hands.

Mika also took part in numerous protests against right-wing dictatorships in South America.

In 1976, she published an autobiography, Ma Guerre d'Espagne à Moi ("My own Spanish Civil War"), a day-by-day description of life on the front line and in the minds of Republican fighters.

Mika died on 7 July 1992, in Paris. In accordance with her last wishes, her ashes were spread out in the waters of the Seine.

== Selected works ==
- Ma guerre d'Espagne à moi, Paris, Les Lettres nouvelles, Éditions Denoël, 1975, OCLC 461409358.
- Ma guerre d'Espagne à moi : une femme à la tête d'une colonne au combat, Arles, Actes Sud, 1998, ISBN 9782742720613, OCLC 41076762.
- Ma guerre d’Espagne à moi, Milena, 2014, ISBN 978-2-9548175-0-7, BnF.

== Sources ==
- «Mika, la mujer capitana en la Guerra Civil Española era de Moisés Ville». Diario La Opinión. (in Spanish)
- Hugo Fontana (8 de febrero de 2013). «Mika, la capitana». El País. (in Spanish)
- «La capitana Mika sale del olvido». El País. (in Spanish)
- «Elsa Osorio rescata del olvido a "la Capitana", una Argentina en la Guerra Civil española». Europa Press. (in Spanish)
- Mika Etchebéhère, "Ma guerre d'Espagne à moi: une femme à la tête d'une colonne au combat", Libertalia, 2021. (in French)

== Bibliography ==
- Elsa Osorio, La Capitana, traduit de l'espagnol par François Gaudry, Éditions Métailié, collection Bibliothèque Hispano-américaine, 2012, note.
- Édouard Waintrop, Ma sœur, mon capitaine. Les souvenirs de Mika Etchebéhère, chef de brigade du POUM pendant la guerre d'Espagne, Libération, 14 January 1999, text.
- Claude Guillon, Ma Guerre d’Espagne à moi de Mika Etchebéhère : « Pour une révolution, c’est une révolution ! », Bibliothèque D'une révolution l'autre, 8 July 2014, text.
- Juan Rústico (pseudonyme de Hippolyte Etchebéhère), 1933, la tragédie du prolétariat allemand, Éditions Spartacus, 2003.
- Luis Portela, Mika Etchebéhère : una heroica y desconocida combatiente de nuestra guerra civil, Historia y Vida, February 1977.
- Cynthia Gabbay, "Identidad, género y prácticas anarquistas en las memorias de Micaela Feldman y Etchebéhère", Forma. Revista d'estudis comparatius. Art, literatura, pensament, nº 14, Barcelona, 2016, pp. 35–57. http://www.raco.cat/index.php/Forma/article/view/326720/417234
- Gabbay, Cynthia (2020). "(Jewish) Women's Narratives of Caring and Medical Practices During the Spanish Civil War". Nashim: A Journal of Jewish Women's Studies & Gender Issues. 36 (1): 205–233. doi:10.2979/nashim.36.1.11. S2CID 226448820. Project MUSE 760408.
- Cynthia Gabbay, “El onceavo mandamiento: memoria del fuego en la literatura judía y feminista de la guerra civil española”, (Eds.) Emmanuel Kahan, Ariel Raber, y Wanda Wechsler (NEJ, IDES), Hacer Patria. Estudios sobre la vida judía en Argentina, Buenos Aires: Teseo, 2020, 31-67. ISBN 9789878654430, publié aussi dans Mozaika Magazine, Barcelona, 5 novembre 2020 http://mozaika.es/magazine/en/el-onceavo-mandamiento-memoria-del-fuego-en-la-literatura-judia-y-feminista-de-la-guerra-civil-espanola-3/
- Cynthia Gabbay, “Babilonia y Revolución en España: Prácticas de escritura cosmopolita de una miliciana/ Mika Feldman Etchebehere”, (Eds.) Julia Kölbl, Iryna Orlova et Michaela Wolf, ¿Pasarán? Kommunikation im Spanischen Bürgerkrieg. Interacting in the Spanish Civil War, Vienna: New Academic Press, 2020, 82-99. ISBN 978-3-7003-2179-8
