= Amilcar Balercia =

Argentine footballer

Personal information
- Full name: Amilcar Adrián Balercia
- Date of birth: 24 June 1967 (age 59)
- Place of birth: Carhué, Argentina
- Height: 1.79 m (5 ft 10 in)
- Position: Midfielder

Youth career
- Huracán

Senior career*
| Years | Team | Apps | (Gls) |
| 1986–1989 | Huracán | | |
| 1989–1991 | Soinca Bata | 78 | (1) |
| 1992 | Audax Italiano | 28 | (0) |
| 1993–1994 | Huracán | 2 | (0) |
| 1995 | Racing de Carhué | – | (–) |
| 1995 | Colchagua | 27 | (3) |
| 1995–1996 | Rangers | 27 | (1) |
- * Club domestic league appearances and goals

Amilcar Adrián Balercia (born 24 June 1967) is an Argentine former professional footballer who played for clubs in Argentina and Chile.

== Career ==
In his homeland, Balercia played for Huracán and Racing Club de Carhué.

Abroad, Balercia played in Chile for Soinca Bata, the previous club to Deportes Melipilla, Audax Italiano, Colchagua and Rangers.
