= A veinte años, Luz =

1998 novel by Elsa Osorio

- First edition
- Author: Elsa Osorio
- Language: Spanish et al.
- Genre: Contemporary novel
- Publisher: Alba Editorial
- Publication date: 1998
- Publication place: Argentina
- Media type: Print (hardback and paperback)
- Pages: 512
- ISBN: 978-8498411997

A veinte años, Luz (Twenty Years Later, Luz) is the first novel by Argentinian author Elsa Osorio, first published in 1998. The English-language version of her novel, My Name is Light, was first published in 2003.

== Plot summary ==
Upon giving birth to a son, John, a tiny doubt in Luz's mind takes root and soon grows into an obsession, and thus begins Luz's quest for her past: was she indeed, as she had always believed, the daughter and granddaughter of a family loyal to the dictatorship in Argentina, or was she in fact one of the country's missing children, one of the desaparecidos whose whereabouts were in many cases never discovered.

Luz (whose name means "light" in Spanish) seeks her true identity with great courage, bringing to light the darkest corners of the society in which she has been raised, and of which, until now, considered herself a participant. Her search will lead to the discovery of a country divided by a brutal, criminal regime, which caused its own citizens to vanish, hiding them and, worst of all, forgetting them.

== Literary and critical importance ==
The book won an Amnesty International book prize and has been translated into sixteen languages.

== See also ==
- Grandmothers of the Plaza de Mayo
- Dirty War
- National Reorganization Process
