= Omar Graffigna =

Argentine Air Force officer (1926–2019)

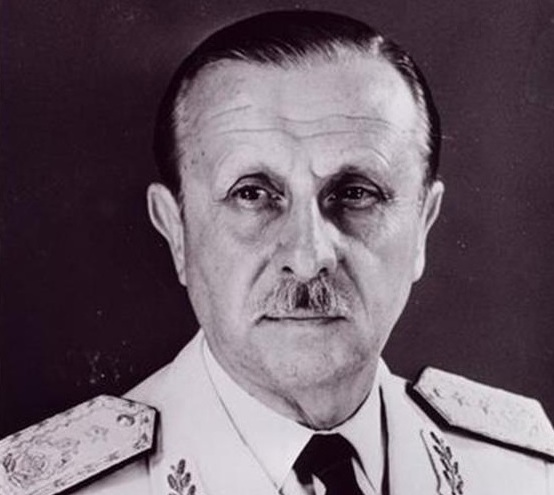
- Born: Omar Domingo Rubens Graffigna; April 2, 1926; Clarke, Santa Fe Province
- Died: December 9, 2019 (aged 93); Buenos Aires
- Military career
- Allegiance: Argentina
- Branch: Argentine Air Force
- Service years: 1944–1981
- Rank: Brigadier General
- Commands: Chief of the General Staff (1979–81)
- Conflicts
- Criminal information
- Convictions: Crimes against humanity, including kidnapping, torture and murder
- Penalty: 25 years in prison

Details
- Date apprehended: 2013

Omar Domingo Rubens Graffigna (April 2, 1926 – December 9, 2019) was an Argentine Air Force officer who served in the second military junta of the National Reorganization Process dictatorship. Along with Santiago Omar Riveros, he was one of the last two surviving (as of 2018) members of the dictatorship. On 8 September 2016 he was sentenced to 25 years' imprisonment for crimes during the dictatorship.

== Biography ==
Graffigna was born in rural Clarke, Santa Fe Province. He graduated from the School of Military Aviation, and became Chief of Staff of the Argentine Air Force after the March 1976 coup. He initiated the Cóndor missile program during his tenure as Air Force Chief of Staff, and in 1978, the Cóndor I sounding rocket was converted into a tactical missile, albeit without a sophisticated guidance system.

He succeeded General Orlando Agosti as Commander of the Air Force in January 1979, and continued Agosti's policy of having the post serve as a moderating counterweight to the hard-line Navy stance. Graffigna was a vocal advocate of the Dirty War, however, stating in December 1979 that "in a dangerously disoriented world, destiny has given us only one option: to be part of the spiritual reserve of the West."

== Trials and imprisonment ==
Graffigna was indicted for kidnapping, torture, robbery, invasion of property and forgery of public documents during the historic Trial of the Juntas in 1985. His case benefited from a ruling during the sentencing phase of the trial that punishment should be determined by the relative roles of each branch of the Argentine Armed Forces in each case, thereby lessening sentences for the Air Force commanders on trial. Graffigna and his successor, General Basilio Lami Dozo, were acquitted of all charges.

In 2003 Graffigna was ordered arrested again by Judge Rodolfo Canicoba Corral pursuant to a request for his extradition to Spain by Judge Baltazar Garzón on the charge of crimes against humanity.

Prime Minister José María Aznar of Spain decided that extraditions to Spain of those implicated in crimes during the Argentine dictatorship were now unwarranted, as Argentina had repealed an amnesty absolving those involved of responsibility for crimes, so that they could now be dealt with in Argentina. In 2005, however, the Supreme Court of Spain annulled the Prime Minister's decision and ordered that extradition proceedings begin. Graffigna and Lami Dozo unsuccessfully petitioned the Argentine Federal Court for a habeas corpus ruling for what they maintained was a lack of jurisdiction on the part of Spanish courts.

On 8 September 2016 Graffigna was sentenced in Argentina to 25 years' imprisonment for the abduction, torture and murder of the married couple Patricia Roisinblit and José Manuel Pérez Rojo in 1978 by the air force's Buenos Aires Regional Intelligence (RIBA). Roisinblit was 8 months pregnant; her child was born and given to air force intelligence operative Francisco Gómez (sentenced to 12 years in prison for his part) and his wife Teodora Jofre to raise as their own. Roisinblit and Pérez Rojo were never seen again. Luis Trillo, the head of RIBA, was sentenced to 25 years for the murder. Before sentencing Graffigna made no reference to the crimes, but said that he had behaved in an entirely professional way in the last six years of his career.

Military offices
| Preceded by Orlando Ramón Agosti | Commander-in-Chief of the Argentine Air Force; 1979 – 1981 | Succeeded by Basilio Lami Dozo |
