= Jevel Katz =

Jevel Katz (1902–1940) was a Lithuanian Jewish singer and stage performer, who migrated to Argentina and became popular there for his songs, which often mixed Yiddish humorously with Spanish.

== Biography ==
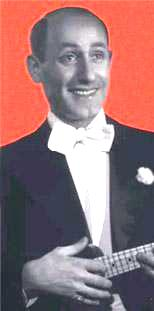
Jevel Katz

Jevel Katz was born in Vilna (Vilnius), known as the "Jerusalem of Lithuania", into a family with few resources. At a very young age he began working as a tool maker in the Rom brothers' printing press. He began singing his first parodies in the Vilnius graphic workers' union. At the age of 27, he decided to follow a brother of his who was already living in Buenos Aires. He quickly became one of the most popular Yiddish performers on the Yiddish stage in Argentina, with a combination of monologues, humoresques, couplets, parodies, nostalgic songs, and satires, while accompanying himself on guitar, mandolin, harmonica, and/or accordion.

Jevel Katz defined himself as a caberet singer (kleynkunst, in Yiddish); he would perform in a tuxedo or dressed as a gaucho or as a woman. Katz sang in Yiddish, mixed with Spanish. The Argentine Jewish poet and critic Eliahu Toker labelled this language mixture castídish. These humorous songs included tangos, rumbas, rancheras, and fox-trots. Performing on radio stations in Buenos Aires and Montevideo, he toured the interior of Argentina, especially the Jewish colonies of Moisés Ville and Basavilbaso, and performed in Tucumán, Uruguay and Chile.

The keys to his success were his versatile performance style and themes of nostalgia, privation, and struggle tugged at his audiences’ heartstrings, combined with comic relief. For example, one of his songs “A rantshera (A ranchera7),” spoofs the travails of a recently arrived bachelor seeking to flee habits from the old country and establish roots in a new land. Appeals to local patriotism, celebrating the settlements in songs about Moises Ville, Basavilbaso, and Buenos Aires reassured them about the decision to uproot themselves and settle along the banks of the Río de la Plata. These “Argentine shtetl” songs also use a tongue-in cheek method, such as in Basivilbaso called “shtetele du mayns” (my little town)] is referred to as the “Kasrilevke of Entre Ríos,” an affectionate reference to Sholem Aleichem’s fictional town of busybodies. Similarly, “Mosesville” called “mayn kleyn shtetele . . . mayn sheyn heymele” (my small town, my lovely home) is as “a yidishe medine . . . a shtolts far Argentine” (a Jewish state, the pride of Argentina).

In his short ten-year career, Jevel Katz, also called Jévele or Kétzele, wrote or set to music more than five hundred musical pieces of the most varied styles: vidalitas, rancheras, fox-trots, tangos and rumbas. He published one booklet of songs, “Argentiner glikn,” includes Yiddish tangos, rancheras, rumbas and foxtrots (without music).

Among his well-known creations are: "Zlate", "Tucumán", "Basavilbaso", and "Moisés Ville".

Katz's success extended beyond Buenos Aires to other cities and the Jewish agricultural colonies in Argentina and bordering countries. His comic persona is reflected in his reputation as "der freylekhster yid in Argentine" [the happiest Jew in Argentina]. His fame even reached the North American Yiddish stage.

Jevel Katz died at the young age of 37 in Buenos Aires, on March 8, 1940, due to a complication of a tonsil operation that he underwent after receiving a job offer in the United States. According to Di Prese, one of the two main Yiddish-language daily newspapers of Argentina, about twenty thousand people paid their respects preceding the funeral, and about forty thousand people attended his funeral. He was buried in the Cementerio Israelita de Liniers.

He was known posthumously as the "Jewish Gardel", after Carlos Gardel, who had died at the height of his musical career in 1935.

== Filmography ==
In 2005, Argentine filmmaker Alejandro Vagnenkos released the documentary Jevel Katz y sus paisanos, which chronicles the comedian's life in Argentina.
