= Rosa Tarlovsky de Roisinblit =

Argentine human rights activist (1919–2025)

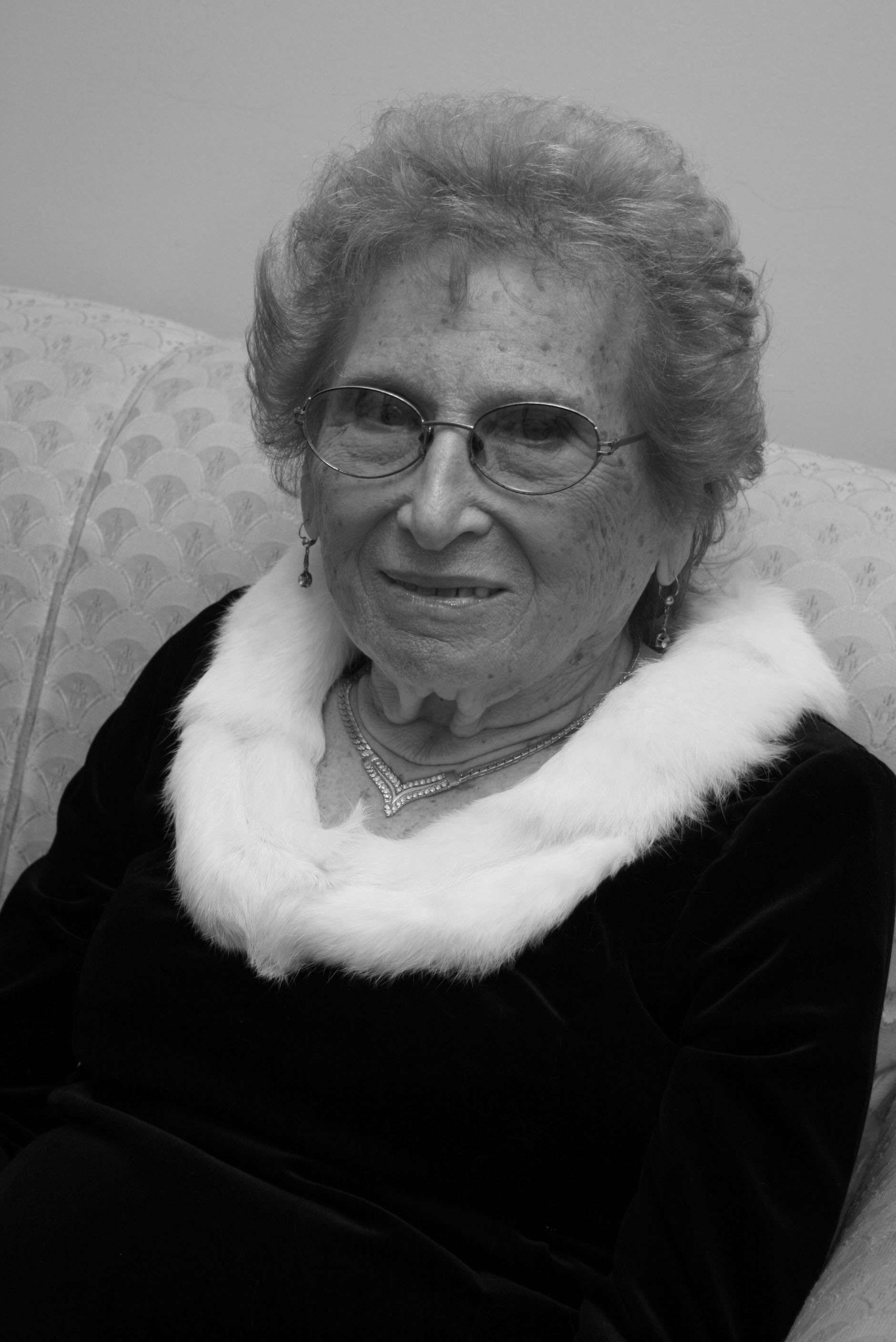
- Tarlovsky in 2009
- Born: 15 August 1919; Moisés Ville, Santa Fe Province, Argentina
- Died: 6 September 2025 (aged 106); Buenos Aires, Argentina
- Occupation: Activist
- Spouse: Benjamín Roisinblit
- Children: 1

Rosa Tarlovsky de Roisinblit (15 August 1919 – 6 September 2025) was an Argentine human rights activist who served as vice president and founding member of the Grandmothers of the Plaza de Mayo Association.

== Biography ==
Tarlovsky was born in Moisés Ville, in a rural area of the province of Santa Fe, to farming and ranching Russian-Jewish immigrants. At age 15, she moved to Rosario to study midwifery. She then worked at the Faculty of Medicine of that city until 1944. She married Benjamin Roisinblit in 1951.

On 6 October 1978, her daughter, Patricia Julia Roisinblit, who was eight months pregnant, was kidnapped with her (Patricia's) husband, José Manuel Pérez Rojo, and their one-year-old daughter, Mariana, by a task force of the Argentine Air Force. Both Patricia and José Manuel were members of the Montoneros. Although Mariana was returned to José Manuel's family, it is presumed that the two adults were killed in the context of illegal repression that took place in Argentina during the National Reorganization Process military dictatorship. Rosa's grandson and Mariana's brother, born in captivity at the Naval Mechanics School on 15 November of that year, was given to Air Force civilian worker Francisco Gómez and his wife to raise as their own; he was found in 2000, with their relation confirmed by DNA test.

In September 2016, Omar Graffigna, Commander of the Air Force at the time of the kidnapping, and the Air Force's Buenos Aires Regional Intelligence (RIBA) head Luis Trillo were sentenced to 25 years imprisonment for the abduction and torture of the couple. Gómez, who had been given Patricia's baby, was imprisoned for 12 years. Before sentencing Graffigna made no reference to the crimes, but said that he had behaved in an entirely professional way in the last six years of his career. Tarlovsky de Roisinblit turned 100 in August 2019.

She died on 6 September 2025, at the age of 106.
