= Colonia Lapin =

- Interactive map of Colonia Lapin
- Coordinates: 37°22.377′S 63°03.127′W
- Country: Argentina
- Province: Buenos Aires
- Partido: Adolfo Alsina
- Founded: November 6, 1919
- Elevation: 297 m (974 ft)
- CPA Base: B 7530
- Area code: +54 2922

Colonia Lapin, usually known as Lapin, is a settlement located near the town of Rivera in the southwest region of the Province of Buenos Aires, Argentina, in the Municipality of Adolfo Alsina.

== History ==
Jewish immigrants founded Colonia Lapin on November 6, 1919. Colonia Lapin was originally settled by twenty-five families from Colonia Esmeralda (Bernasconi) in the Province of Buenos Aires due to the unfavorable conditions such as harsh climate and lack of drinking water. Mr. Eusebio Lapin, Director of the Jewish Colonization Association, facilitated the colonization after hearing about the hardships faced by these settlers. He was able to acquire 36 square miles (93 km^{2}) of land from Baron Maurice de Hirsch of Estación Rivera to distribute among the colonists. In return, the families gave the Baron a share of the crops. The colony was originally registered as Phillippson No 3, but its first settlers took steps to rename it "Colonia Lapin" in recognition and gratitude to Eusebio Lapin.

In 1921, more families arrived and the colony began to flourish. At the time of its establishment, no services or commercial infrastructure existed. By 1921, however, significant economic, social, and spiritual needs led to the creation of various institutions, including a primary school, a Hebrew school, a synagogue, and an arts center that also served as a theater and library.

While "Colonia Lapin" still exists, most of the residents have left and many of the farms have been consolidated. The theater still exists and a monument has been erected in dedication to the founding families.
