= The Leith Agency =

Scottish creative agency

The Leith Agency Ltd
- Industry: Creative agency
- Founded: 1984; 42 years ago
- Fate: Acquired
- Headquarters: Edinburgh, Scotland, United Kingdom
- Website: www.leith.co.uk

The Leith Agency is a creative agency that predominantly focuses on advertising. It is based in the Leith area of Edinburgh, Scotland. The agency was founded in St Mary's School House, Leith in 1984, starting life as a traditional advertising agency. It was bought by marketing services group Cello in 2004.

== History ==
In 2001, it was an investor in online business-to-business off-licence Mustang Interactive. In 2006, The Leith Agency went through a restructuring of its senior management, appointing Richard Marsham as managing partner responsible for running the organisation's Edinburgh office.

As part of its community initiatives, it is actively involved in The Leith Festival, runs free clinics for small local businesses and has developed a programme to identify creative excellence in the community - Talentspotting. During The Leith Festival in 2007, the agency unofficially twinned Leith with Rio de Janeiro by placing a sign on Leith Walk.

More recently, the Leith Agency has started Leith Records, a place to showcase new local and Scottish music, and Leith Dock, a blog for interesting and inspirational happenings in Edinburgh, Scotland and beyond. In 2010, it staged a production of Shakespeare's The Tempest on a barge in Leith.

In 2012, it launched a breast cancer awareness campaign for the Scottish government featuring Elaine C Smith. It was claimed to be the first UK television ad to feature full-frontal bare breasts. It has also produced campaigns for Health Promotion Agency Northern Ireland.

In 2013, it purchased Newhaven Communications, another advertising agency which had worked for brewer Tennent's and on government campaigns, and which had been formed 11 years previously by former Leith Agency employees.

In 2017, The Leith Agency went through another restructuring that saw several roles in the company being made redundant, to be replaced with other positions which the agency perceived as having "bigger potential for growth".

== Recognition ==
The Leith Agency was voted Scotland's top advertising agency in 1993 in a poll for Scotmedia magazine and in 2001, it won the Scottish Institute of Practitioners in Advertising award for most effective campaign for promoting now-defunct radio station Beat 106.

The Agency has created campaigns for global brands such as Honda, Grolsch and SEAT from its offices in the docks of Edinburgh. It promoted Coors Light from 2003 to 2010. Its work includes notable television adverts such as The Snowman for Irn-Bru and campaigns for legislation including the Scottish smoking ban in public places. The agency has won many effectiveness and creative awards, such as the Grand Prix at the Roses Advertising Awards 2009.

== Acquisition ==
In August 2020, The Leith Agency as part of its holding company, Cello Health plc. (formerly Cello Group) was sold to Pharma Value Demonstration Bidco Limited, a newly incorporated company wholly owned by Value Demonstration UK Holdings Limited, a company backed by Arsenal Capital Partners V LP and Arsenal Capital Partners V-B LP, following acceptance of a recommended cash offer by the company shareholders. The share offer of £1.61 per share was accepted at a Shareholders' General Meeting held on the 3rd August.
