= Adolfo Alsina Partido =

Adolfo Alsina
- Department
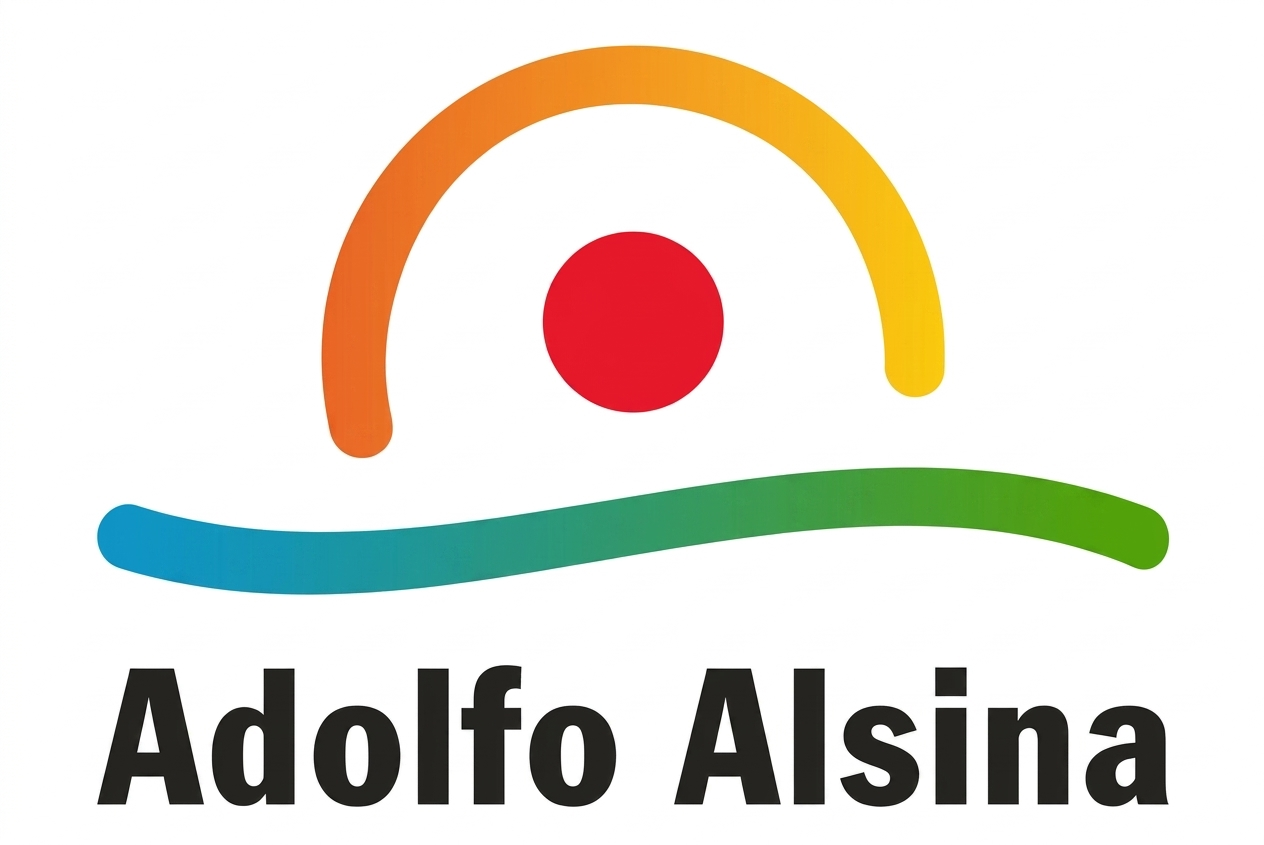
- Flag

- Country: Argentina
- Province: Buenos Aires
- Established: 21 January 1877
- Founder: Nicolás Levalle
- Seat: Carhué

Government
  - Intendant: Javier Andres (UCR)

Area
  - Total: 5,875 km^{2} (2,268 sq mi)

Population
  - Total: 16,245
  - Density: 2.765/km^{2} (7.162/sq mi)
- Demonym: Alsinense
- Postal Code: 6430
- IFAM: BUE001
- Area Code: 02936
- Website: www.aa.mun.gba.gov.ar

Adolfo Alsina is a western partido of the Buenos Aires Province, Argentina, found at coordinates 37°10′S 62°44′W.

It has a population of 16,245, an area of 5,875 km^{2} (2,268 sq mi), and the capital is Carhué.

== History ==
Adolfo Alsina Partido was founded on January 21, 1877.

=== Demographics ===
Evolution of population
	1895	1914	1947	1960	1970	1980	1991	2001	2010
Población	4.143	14.880	22.628	20.908	20.331	19.485	18.077	16.245	17.072
Variación	-	+259,16%	+52,06%	-7,60%	-2,75%	-4,16%	-7,22%	-10,13%	+5,09%

== Towns ==
- Carhué (8,584 inhabitants)
- Arano
- Arturo Vatteone
- Canónigo Gorriti
- Delfín Huergo (37 inhabitants)
- Esteban A. Gascón (100 inhabitants)
- San Miguel Arcángel (649 inhabitants)
- Los Gauchos
- Villa Maza (1,705 inhabitants)
- Murature
- Rivera (3,016 inhabitants)
- Thames (25 inhabitants)
- Tres Lagunas
- Yutuyaco (19 inhabitants)
- Avestruz
- La Pala (25 inhabitants)
- Espartillar
- Villa Margarita
- Colonia Lapin
- Leubucó
