= Elsa Osorio =

Argentinian novelist and screenwriter

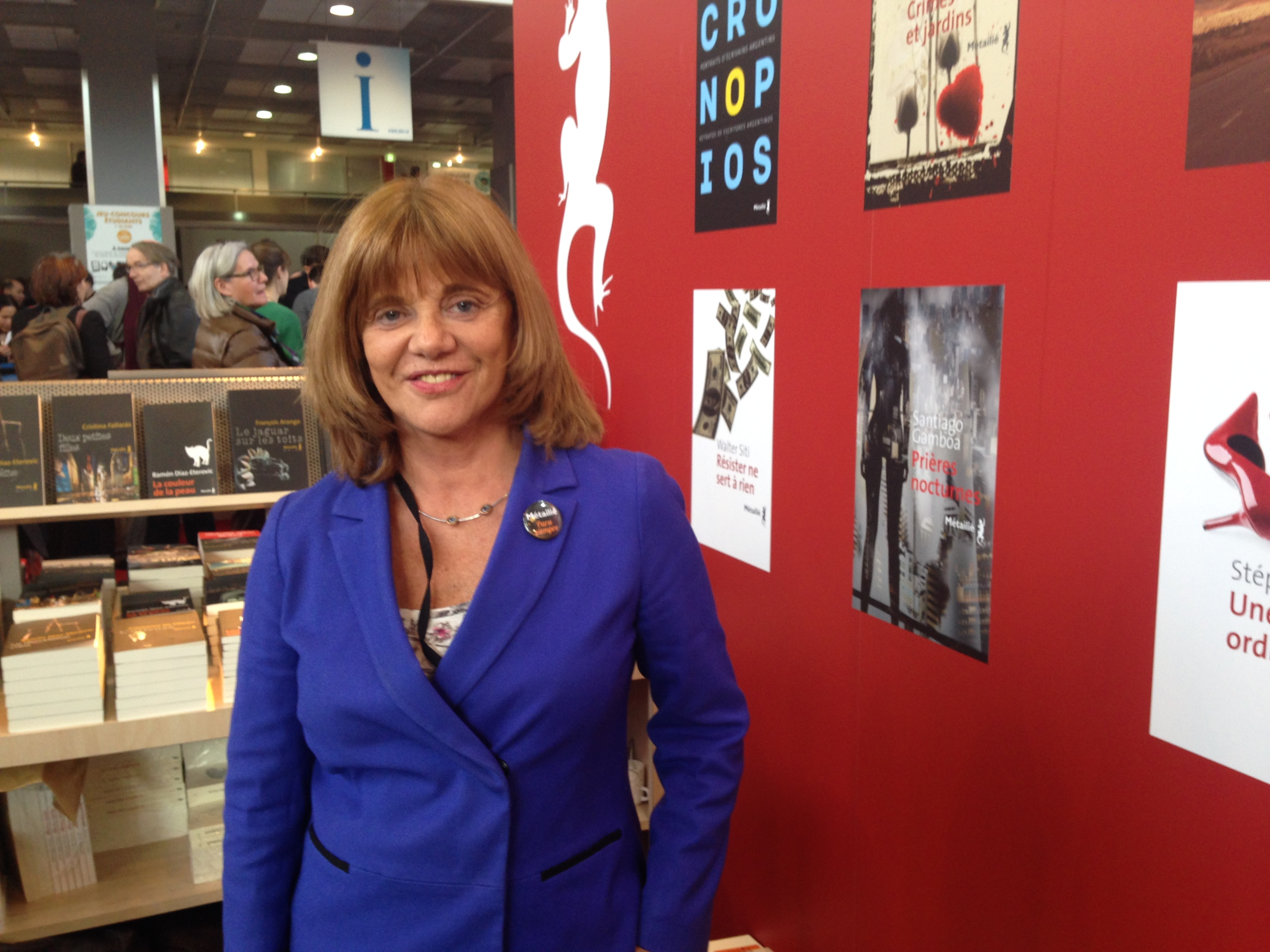
Osorio in 2014

Elsa Osorio (born 1952) is an Argentinian novelist and screenwriter.

Osorio has been awarded Argentina's highest honor for literature, the Premio Nacional de Literatura (National Prize for Literature), and her work has also won the Argentores Award for Best Comedy Screenplay, the Humor Journalism Award, and an Amnesty International Award. She has also been a finalist for the Femina Prize (France). Her sixth novel, A veinte años, Luz (1998) has been translated into 20 languages; the English-language version, My Name is Light, was first published in 2003.

== Life ==
Osorio was born in Buenos Aires in 1952, and lived in Madrid, Spain, for 14 years before returning to Argentina in 2006.

== Literary work ==
At the centre of her literary work lies an examination of contemporary Argentine history. In the process, she turns her attention in particular to the ramifications of politics for the individual, which she illustrates using striking biographies. The Frankfurter Allgemeine Zeitung wrote that the author succeeds in "convincing readers that the instruments of the art of story-telling are shown to be most effective at that point at which they lead us back to reality, where our perspective and our interests, whetted by the imagination, are recalled to reality."

In 1982 she debuted with the volume of short stories Ritos privados (t: Private rites), for which she was awarded the most prestigious literature prize of her country, the Premio Nacional de Literatura Argentina, in the following year. She later published Beatriz Guido (1991), a novel of this Argentine writer's life, and a collection of political and linguistic essays Las malas lenguas (1994; t: The wicked tongues).

Her sixth novel, A veinte anos, Luz (1998; Eng. My name is Light, 2003), was greeted with acclaim on the international scene. It won her Amnesty International's literary prize, was translated into more than fifteen languages, and published in twenty-three countries – only in Argentina was she unable to find a publisher at first. The novel deals with a dark chapter of the Argentine military dictatorship. It tells the story of the fate and search for identity of a young woman, born to opponents of the Junta, who is taken away by the family of an officer who is loyal to the regime.

Another prevailing theme in Osorio's work is tango, which she focused on in her screenplay, La Lección de tango (1997; t: The tango lesson). Her most recent novel, Cielo de tango (2006; t: Tango Sky), also deals with the Argentine dance and merges history and imagination. Like the former work, it unfolds over various temporal planes and tells of two families of differing social backgrounds whose lives are intertwined through tango, beginning with the rise of Argentina in the late eighteenth century and leading up to the present day. For this novel she received the Premio de Bibliotecas in Italy and the Premio Acerbi.

== Awards and travel ==
Among Osorio's further distinctions are an award for best comedy as well as a prize for journalistic satire. Since 2006, she has lived mostly in Buenos Aires, where she often runs creative writing workshops. From 2007 to 2010 she took part in different congresses and fairs, as for example in Saint Malo, "Etonnants Voyageurs", the International Literature Festival in Berlin, the Bookfair in Paris, the Bookfair in the Spanish Gijón, the "Festival de la Palabra" in Puerto Rico, the Bookfair in Medellín and the Bookfair in Frankfurt.

In 2009 she spent a month in Berlin for the LiteraturRaum project. In 2009 she published "Callejón con salida" a collection of short stories that received the Premio Roma for foreign literature in 2010.

== Works ==
- Ritos Privados (1982)
- Reina Mugre (1989)
- Ya no hay hombres (1991)
- Como tenerlo todo (1993)
- Las Malas lenguas (1994)
- A veinte años, Luz (1998)
- Cielo de Tango (2006)
- Callejón con salida (2009)
- La Capitana ( 2012)
- Doble Fondo (2017)
