= Carhué =

- Town
- Location in Argentina
- Coordinates: 37°10′46.52″S 62°45′36.29″W
- Country: Argentina
- Province: Buenos Aires
- Partido: Adolfo Alsina
- Founded: 1877
- Elevation: 107 m (351 ft)

Population (2001)
  - Total: 16,245
  - Density: 2.77/km^{2} (7.2/sq mi)
- Time zone: UTC−3
- CPA Base: B 6430
- Area code: +54 9236
- Climate: Cfa

Carhué is an Argentine town in the Province of Buenos Aires, head of the Municipality (Partido) of Adolfo Alsina. Carhué is 561 km (349 mi) to the west of the city of La Plata and 520 km (323 mi) from Buenos Aires. The city is a tourist destination famous for the thermal waters of Laguna Epecuén, located 8 km (5 mi) from the city.

Carhué was founded in 1877 and declared a city in 1949.

== Translation of Carhué ==
In the Mapuche language, Carhué means "Green Land" (CAR: from Green, and HUÉ: Land or Place).

== Villa Epecuén ==
Located several kilometres to the north of the town is Villa Epecuén, a former resort town that developed in the 1920s. The town was submerged by the lake in 1985, but the waters began to recede in 2009 and the town's ruins became visible. The area is accessible by road from Carhué.

== Notable people ==
- Amilcar Balercia (born 1967), Argentine former footballer
