= Moisés Ville =

- Comuna

- Location in Argentina
- Coordinates: 30°43′S 61°29′W
- Country: Argentina
- Province: Santa Fe
- Department: San Cristóbal
- Established: 1889

Government
  - Communal President: Gustavo Ángel Barceló (FPCyS)

Area
  - Total: 291 km^{2} (112 sq mi)
- Elevation: 83 m (272 ft)

Population (2010)
  - Total: 2,425
  - Density: 8.33/km^{2} (21.6/sq mi)
- Demonym: moisesvillense
- Time zone: UTC−3 (ART)
- Postal code: S2313
- Area code: 03409

Moisés Ville (Spanish pronunciation: [mojsesˈviʃe]; Yiddish: מאָזעסוויל) is a small town (comuna) in the province of Santa Fe, Argentina, founded on 23 October 1889 by Eastern European and Russian Jews escaping pogroms and persecution. The original name was Kiryat Moshe ("Town of Moses" in Hebrew) named by Rabbi Aharon Halevi Goldman, the spiritual and community leader. He explained that just as Moses had brought the Jews out of slavery in Egypt and led them to a free country, this community had left behind the tyranny of Russia to make its way to Argentina. David Horovits translated the name to Moïsesville which was later hispanized to the current Moisés Ville. The town is located about 177 km (110 mi) from the provincial capital, in the San Cristóbal Department and 616 km (383 mi) from Buenos Aires. It had 2,425 inhabitants at the 2010 census [INDEC].

== History ==
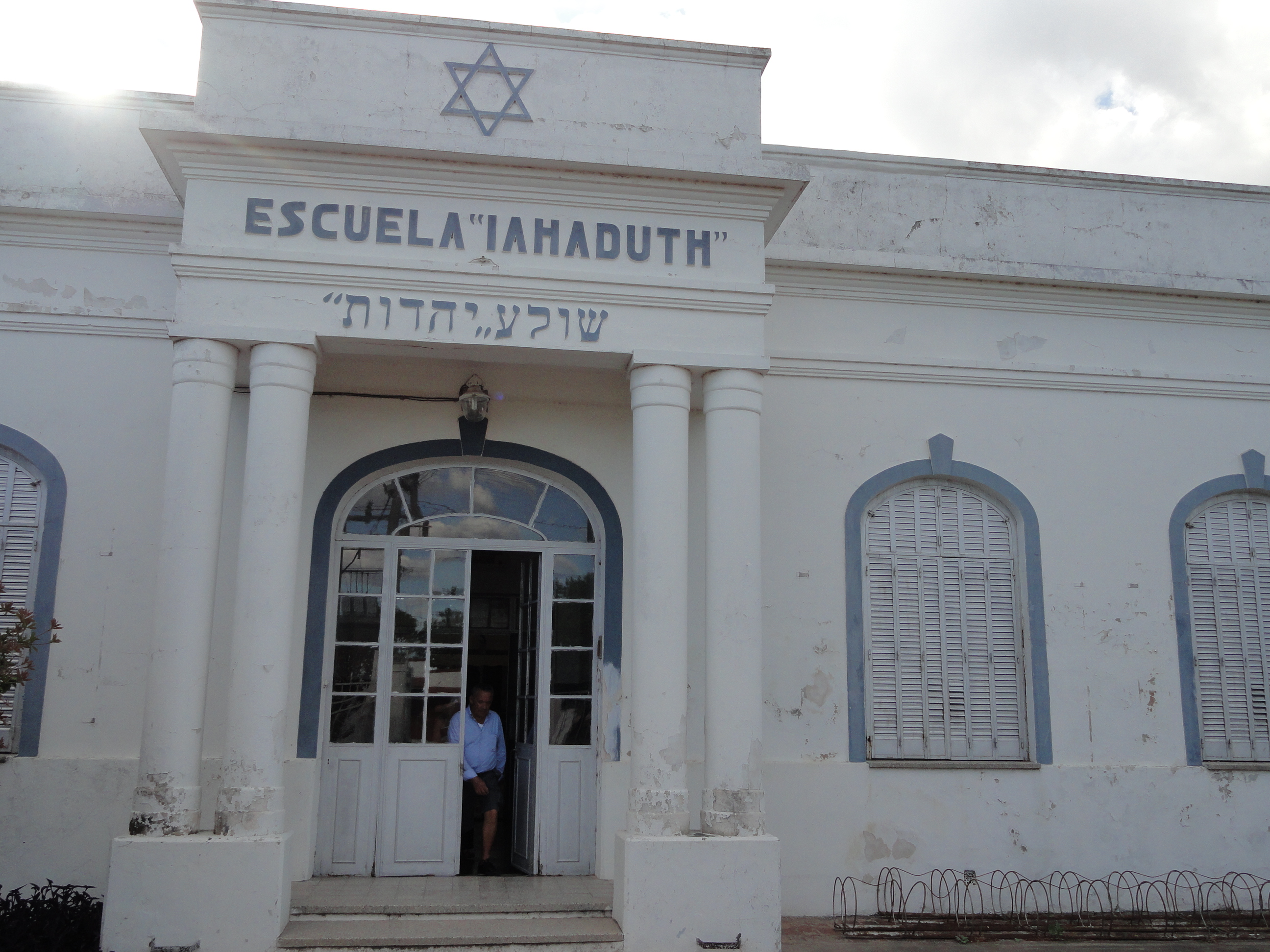
Iahaduth Jewish school in Moisés Ville.

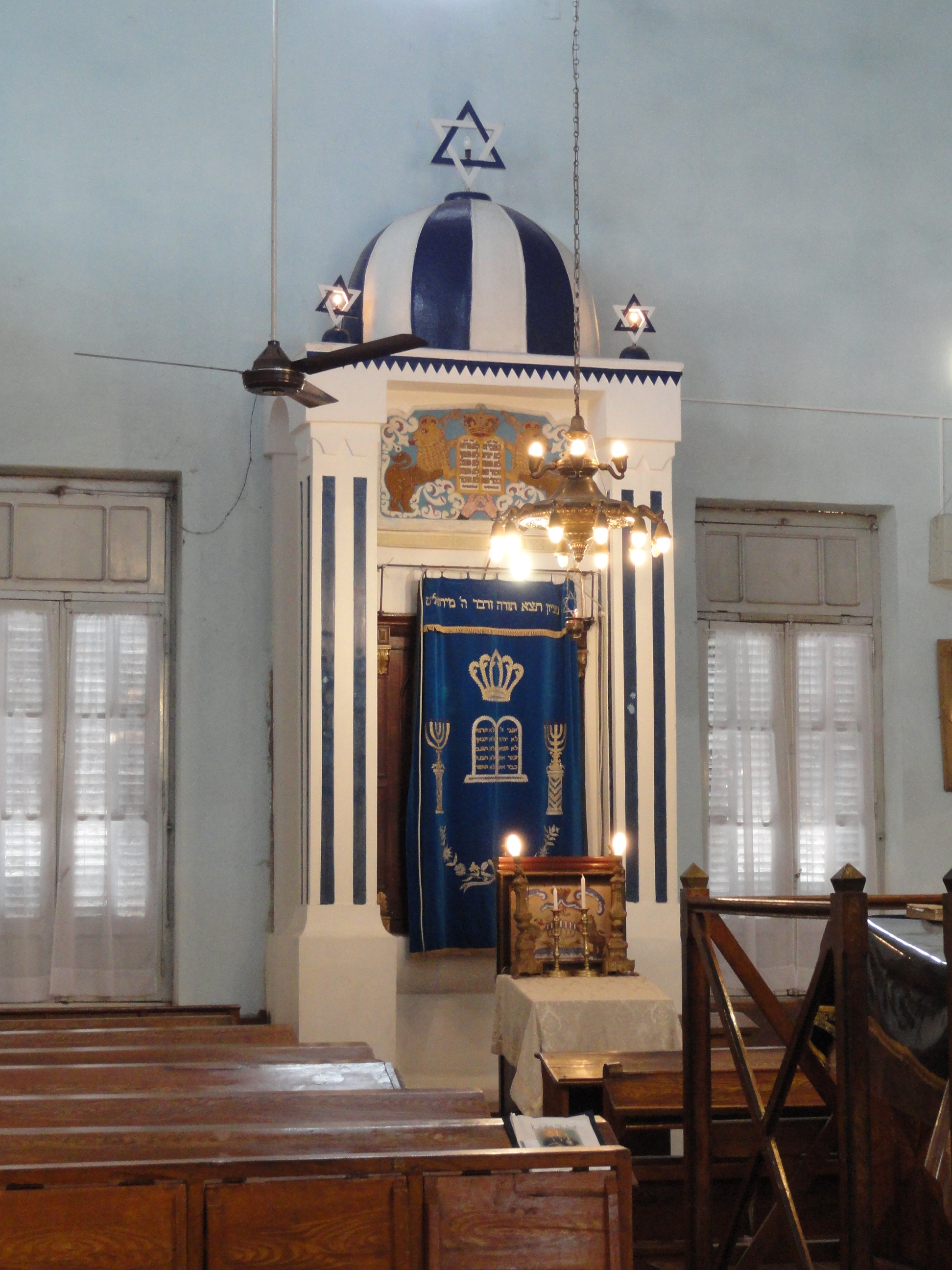
View of the interior of the Baron Hirsch synagogue in Moisés Ville.

Moises Ville was founded by a group of Russian Jewish immigrants who arrived in August 1889 aboard the SS Weser from Kamenetz-Podolsk, Ukraine. Moises Ville is regarded as the first agricultural Jewish colony in South America, beating by some months a smaller group coming from Bessarabia who established a neighbouring settlement called Monigotes.

It all started one day in 1887 when leaders of Jewish communities in Podolia and Bessarabia met in Katowice (Silesia, Poland) to seek a solution to their problems. They decided that emigration to Palestine was the solution and chose a delegate, Eliezer Kauffman, to travel to Paris and meet there the famous Jewish Philanthropist, Baron Edmond James de Rothschild asking for his support.

Two theories exist on what happened next: Some say the negotiations with the Baron failed while others believe Kauffman wasn't able to meet him. Afraid of going back empty-handed and learning that there was an official bureau of information of the Argentine Republic, Kauffman decided to meet J. B. Frank, the officer in charge, and learned that a gentleman named Rafael Hernández was interested in selling lands to European immigrants. The land was in an area known as Nueva Plata, Province of Buenos Aires, near the city of La Plata. A contract was signed there and then and thus the 820 people represented by Kauffman, comprising 130 families (a number equivalent to half the Jewish population of Argentina at that time) began their trip to Argentina on board of the SS Weser.

They arrived at Buenos Aires on August 14, 1889 and learned right away that the lands they had acquired were not available. Since their agreement the price of the land had more than doubled, making it "inconvenient" for unscrupulous Hernández to fulfill the contract. Rabbi Henry Joseph, the leader of Argentine Jewry, tried to save the day and arranged for the newcomers to meet Pedro Palacios, the Jewish Community attorney, who happened to be the owner of vast lands in the Province of Santa Fe, right where the new railway line to Tucumán was being built. Palacios agreed to sell the Weser passengers some land he owned. By late August contracts were signed and the immigrants were on their way. To their dismay the travel was bad and the place they arrived to even worse. The families were lodged in freight cars parked in a shed along the railway line. They expected to be transferred to their fields, get farm animals and agricultural appliances and materials (as established in the contract) but none of these happened. Railway workers distributed food among the hungry children but soon enough a typhus epidemic exacerbated by poor hygiene, took the lives of 64 of them. In a very short time two cemeteries were built, one in Palacios and the other in Monigotes. Those cemeteries in the surroundings of Moises Ville founded the base of the Jewish community and bonded the Jewish immigrants to the land: they made the families stay and not leave the resting place of the deceased unattended.

Meantime, the national authorities, learning of the immigrants' deplorable conditions, ordered an investigation by the General Immigration Commissioner. Luckily for the newcomers, Wilhelm Loewenthal, a Rumanian doctor from the University of Berlin, specializing in bacteriology, who had been hired in Paris by the Argentine government for a scientific mission and also asked by the A.I.U. to keep an eye on the Weser immigrants, traveled to Palacios Train Station where he was astonished by the miserable living conditions of the immigrants. In spite of their ordeal and difficulties the settlers still hoped to become farmers. He reported to the Minister of Foreign Affairs, Estanislao Zeballos and simultaneously met Palacios requesting him to comply with his obligations. Back in Paris, Loewenthal submitted a written project to Rabbi Zadoc Kahn for the agricultural colonization of Jewish families in Argentina by means of establishing a Colonizing Association and allocating to each family a farm of 50 to 100 hectares, at the cost of US$2000 per family. If it had not been for the travelers abandoned in Palacios Station it is unlikely that Baron Hirsch would have thought of sending more Jews to Argentina, or created the JCA. But as a result of the ordeal the 1891 Baron Hirsch Plan was born.

Within the frame of the JCA's program a further group of 42 families from the Province of Grodno arrived to Moises Ville between 1894 and 1895. The colonists settled in villages near Moises Ville, named after the number of houses that formed them: "The Four Houses", "The Six Houses", "The Twelve Houses" and "The Twenty-four houses". In 1900, the colonists requested the JCA to enlarge the colony and bring new groups from the Grodno area. The request was conveyed through the colonist Noe Cociovich who, in 1900, 1901 and 1902, carried out several trips to Russia and assembled three groups totaling 104 families that met the JCA demands: they already had relatives in the colony and they paid for their tickets themselves. The groups settled in the Wavelberg area, north of Moises Ville, which had been named for the philanthropist who helped finance the travel; in the Virginia area to the east, and in La Juanita to the west. In 1901, another group of 31 families organized in Białystok (current Poland) arrived, led by the writer and Jewish leader Gdalia Bublik. The area in which this group settled is known as Línea Białystok (Białystok Line). Many of the colonists who settled in La Juanita and Białystok later moved to the town of Las Palmeras. At the same time, a group of Rumanian families selected by the JCA arrived. This group settled in the area of Zadok Kahn, to the west of Moises Ville. It was named in honor of the above-mentioned Chief Rabbi of Paris. Most of the colonists in that group that remained also eventually moved to Las Palmeras. Dr. Guillermo Lowenthal heard that plans were made to move the settlement to two new locations in the Province of Entre Rios. The Moises Villenses refused: they did not want to leave the place where they were already building a third cemetery to bury the first victim of an attack by gauchos. At the meeting in the synagogue, they decided to stay and bring to Moises Ville the children they had buried in Monigotes and Palacios.

In 1903, soon after the Kishinev pogrom, an additional group from Bessarabia was organized. This group settled in the Mutchnik area, northwest of Moises Ville, at Línea Ortiz (Ortiz Line). And in 1905 a group from Kherson Governorate, Ukraine colonized the area of Monigotes. Several years later the zone of Capivara, to the northeast of Moises Ville, was colonized, In the decade of the 1930s German Jews persecuted by the Nazis began to arrive, in a wave that lasted until the beginning of World War II. After the war was over, several families of Dutch and German refugees arrived, most of them sent by the JCA.

Colonists of the first group and some from the second settled in the surrounding areas of a budding urban center. As Noe Cociovich related, that center had three shaky buildings in 1894: the synagogue, the JCA administration house and the public baths. The colonists' houses were arranged around them along three streets. The plots were 100 meters wide and 1,000 meters deep. Moisés Ville became the canonical town of the Gauchos Judíos ("Jewish Gauchos") who worked the land in Argentina in the late 19th and early 20th centuries.

Moisés Ville, together with its sister colonies of Mauricio and Clara, were the main examples of the work of Baron Maurice de Hirsch's Jewish Colonization Association in Argentina.

Moisés Ville was a center of Jewish and Yiddish culture. Jevel Katz wrote a popular song about the town, Moises Ville. The words in Yiddish and an English translation can be found here.

== Recent times ==
In recent times, Moisés Ville has embarked on a series of development projects, such as the resurfacing of the Provincial Highway 69S , which connects the town to National Highway 34 (Rosario-Salvador Mazza) through Palacios, a small village located at approximately 16 kilometers from the town.

The town is frequently visited by tourists from other parts of Argentina and overseas countries. Moisés Ville is one of the traditional towns included in the Pueblos Auténticos program, launched by the Argentinian government in 2017 in order to promote tourism in rural areas.

Moisés Ville, which hosts a museum dedicated to the preservation of the cultural heritage established by Jewish colonization in the region, is on UNESCO's as a tentative world heritage site.

== Notable buildings ==
- Iahaduth school
- Kadima theater
- Baron Hirsch Library
- Arbeter, Baron Hirsch and Brener synagogues
- Aaron H. Goldman museum
- Jewish cemetery
- The students’ residence
- The hospital
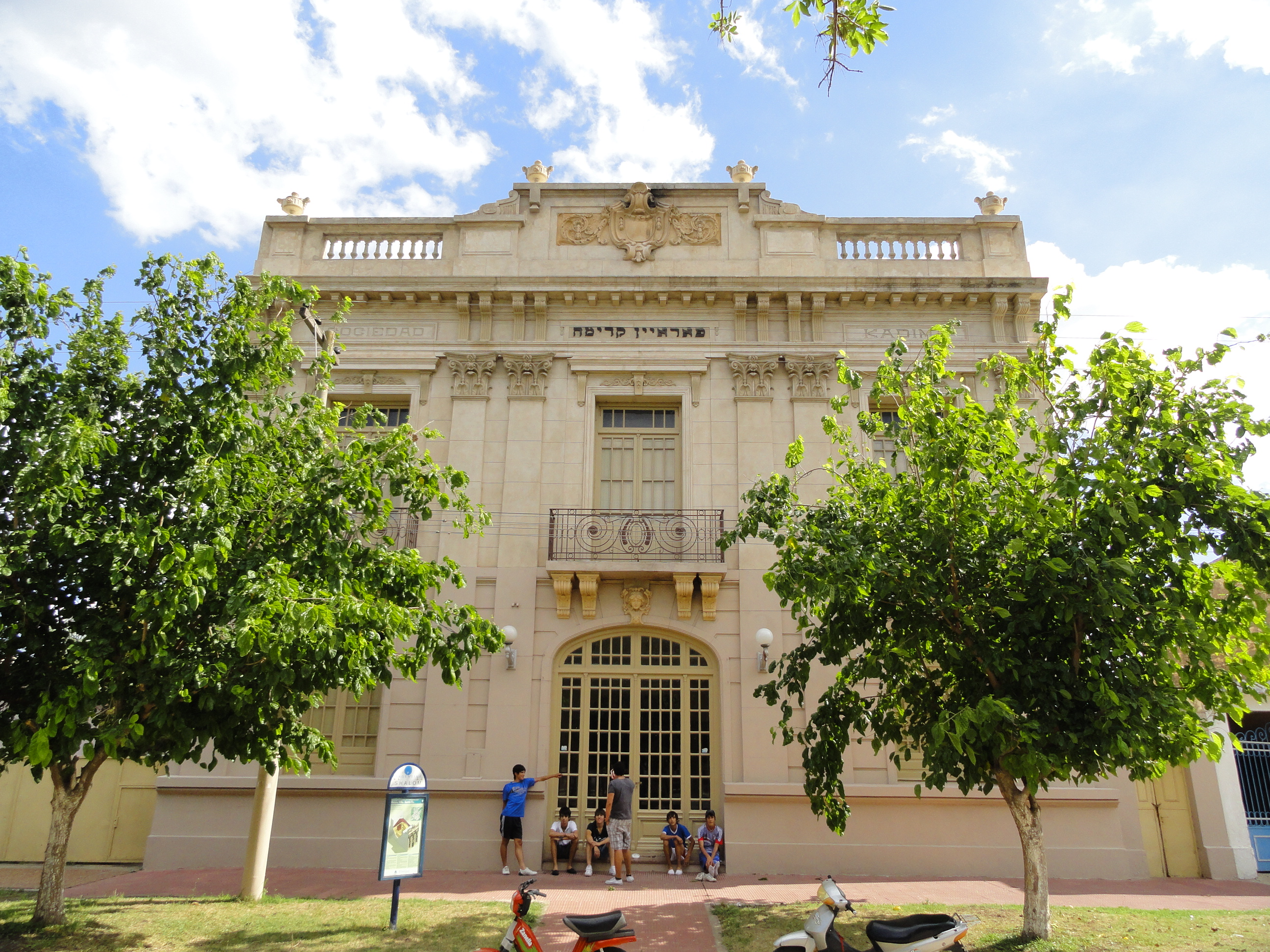
Kadima theater

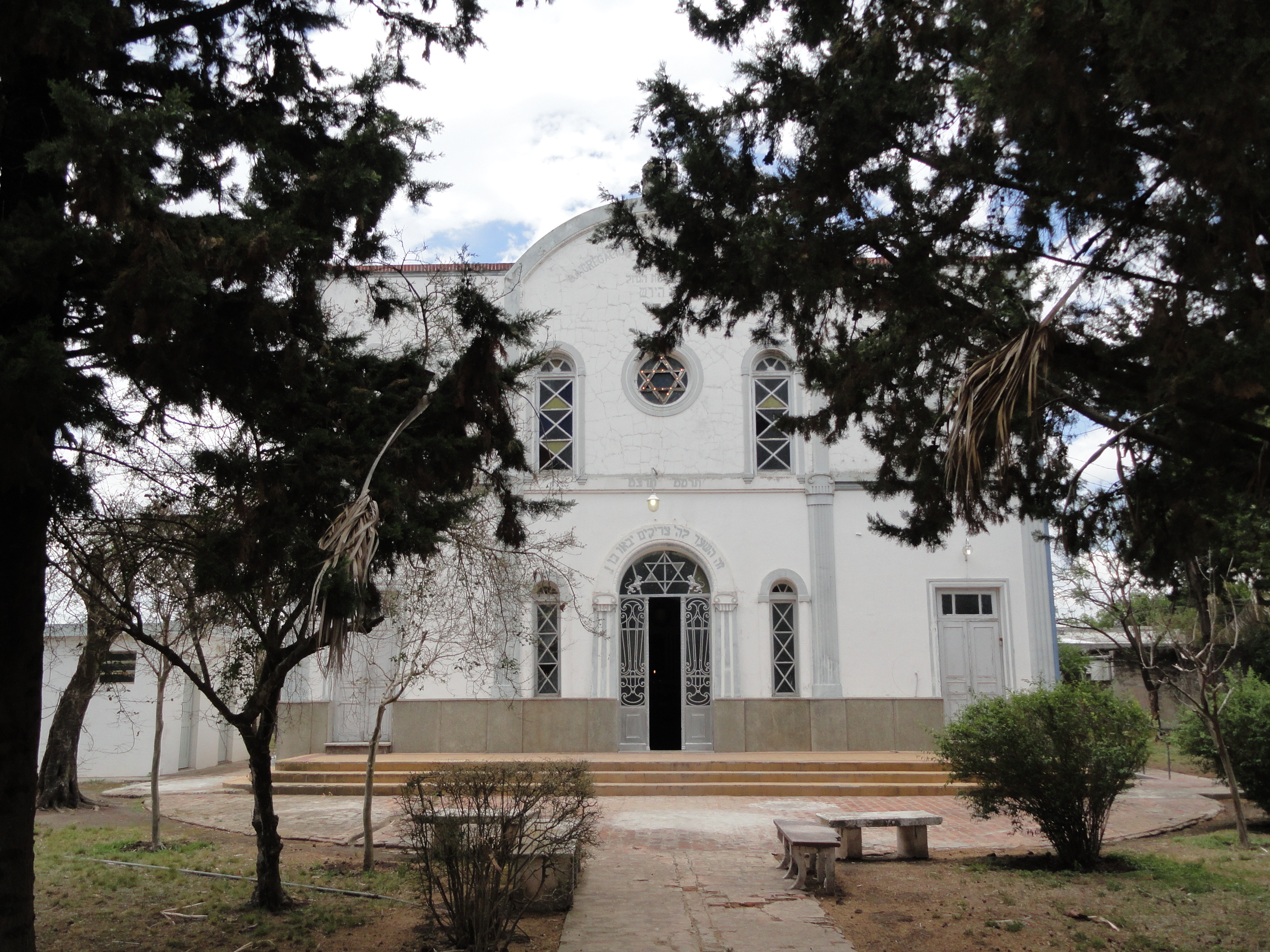
Baron Hirsch Synagogue

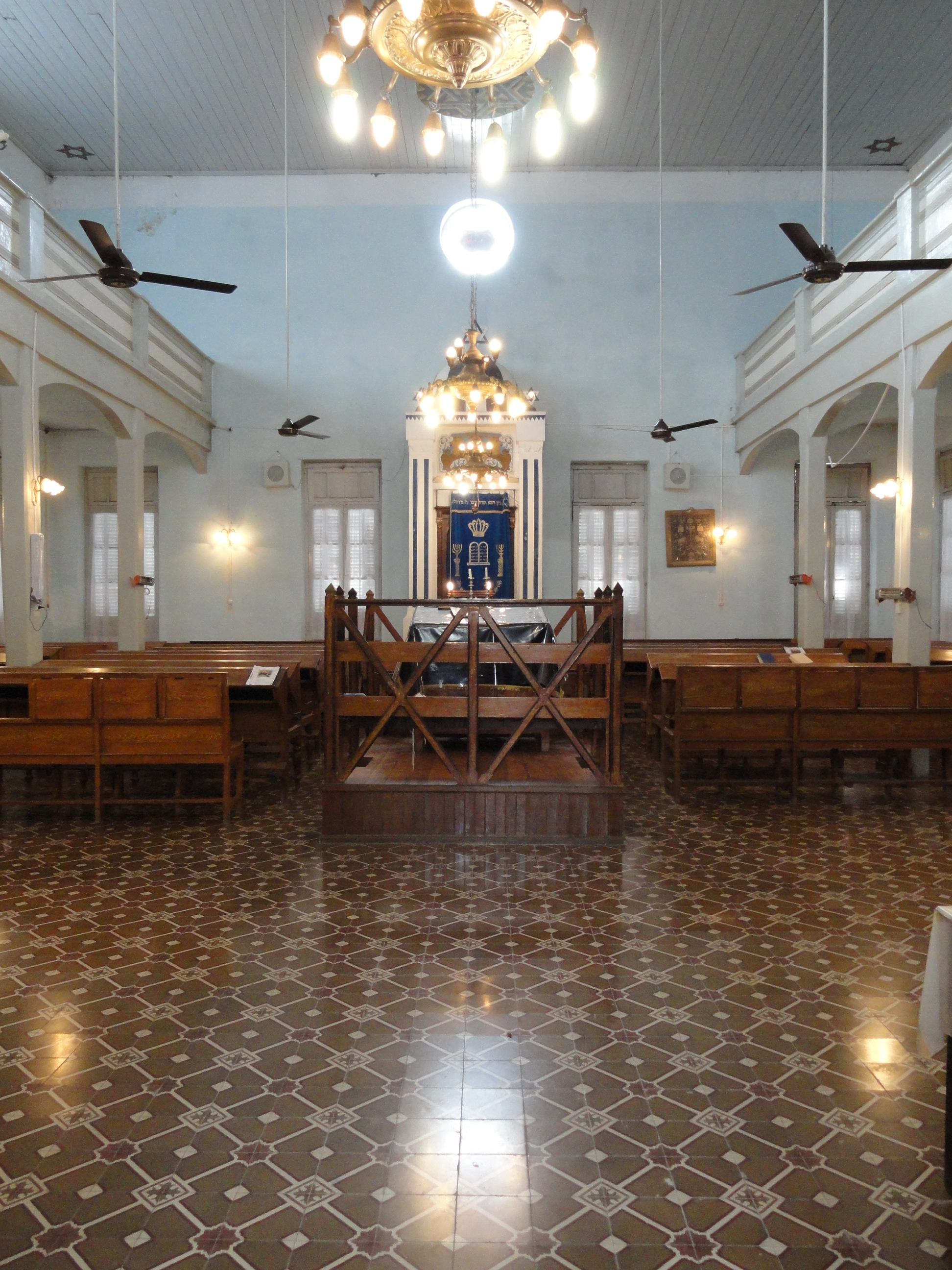
Baron Hirsch Synagogue

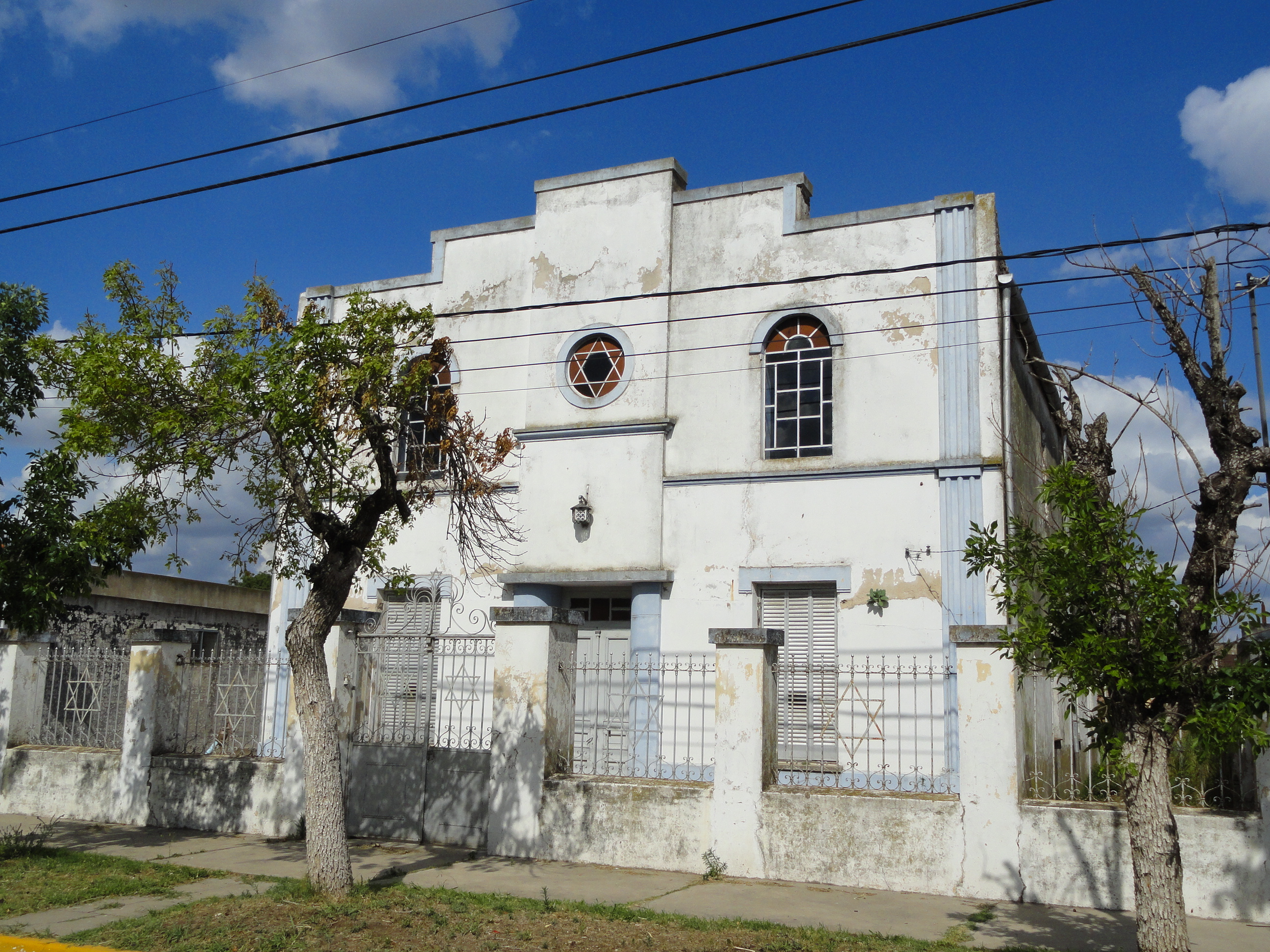
Worker´s Synagogue (Arbeter Shoul)

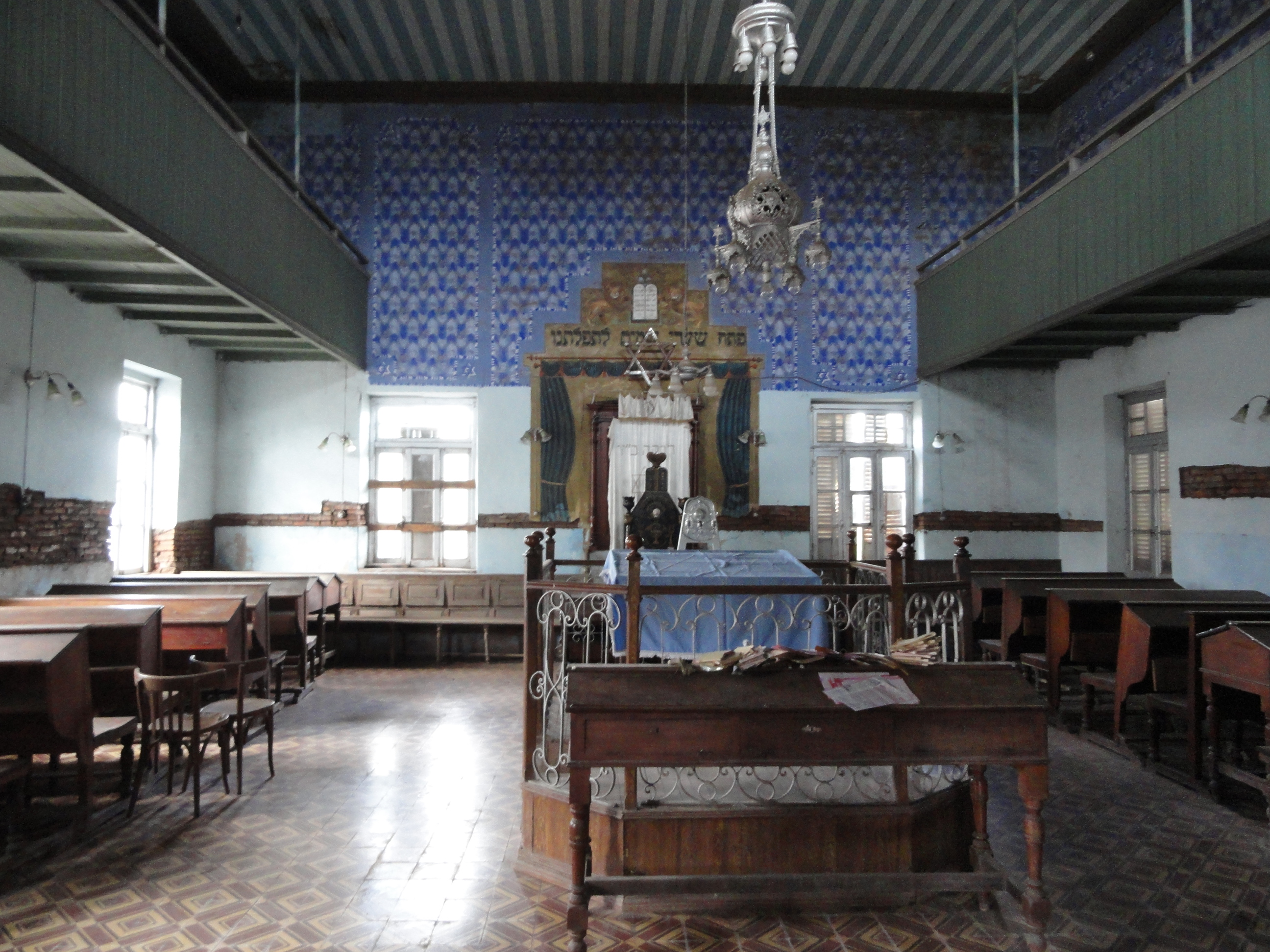
Worker´s Synagogue

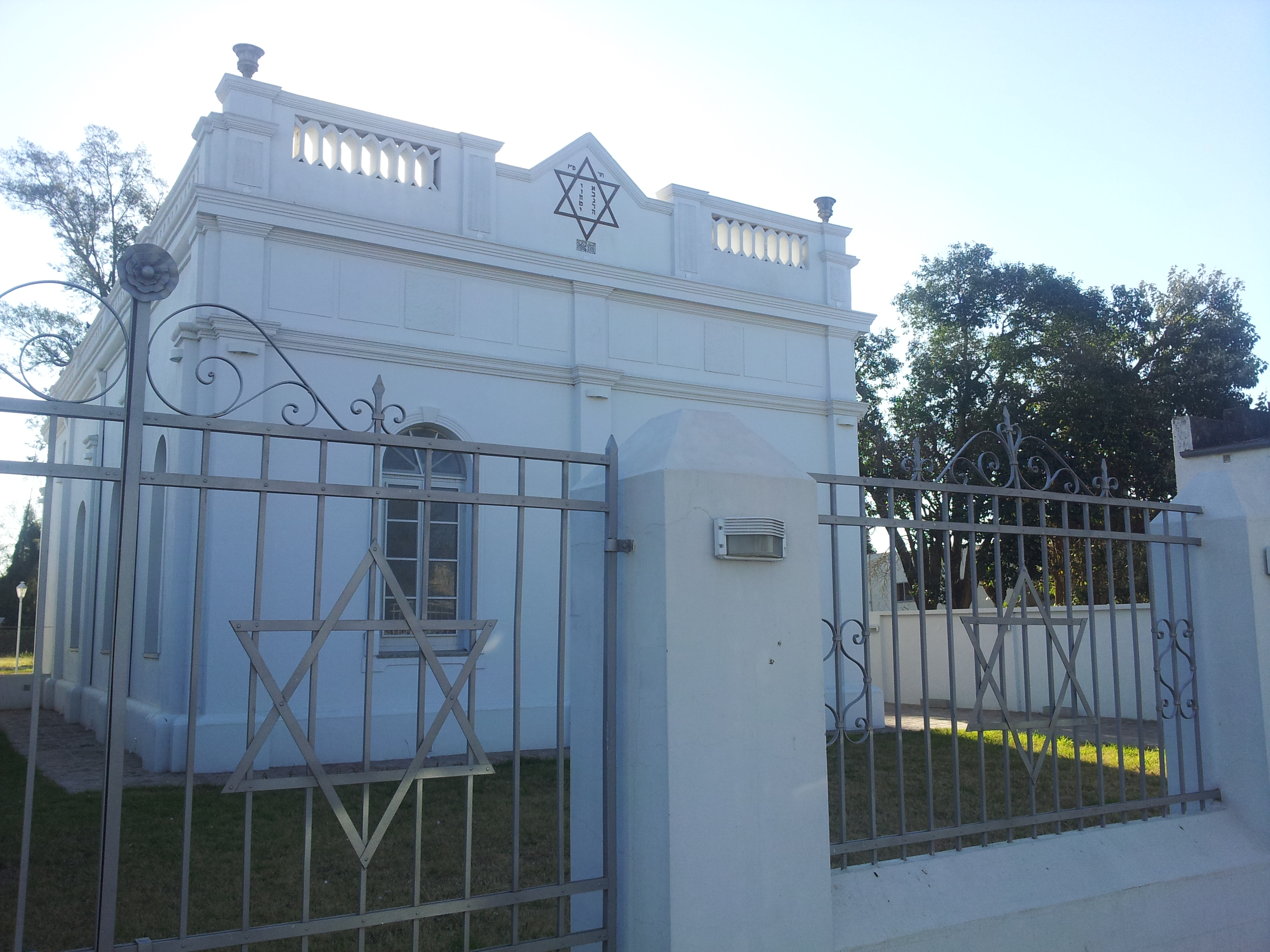
Brener Synagogue

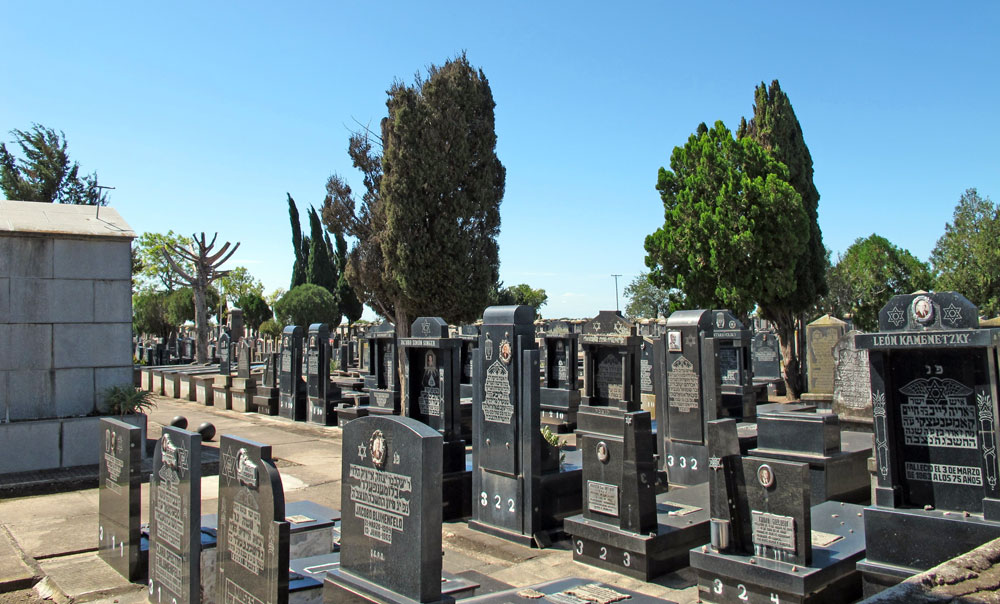
Jewish cemetery

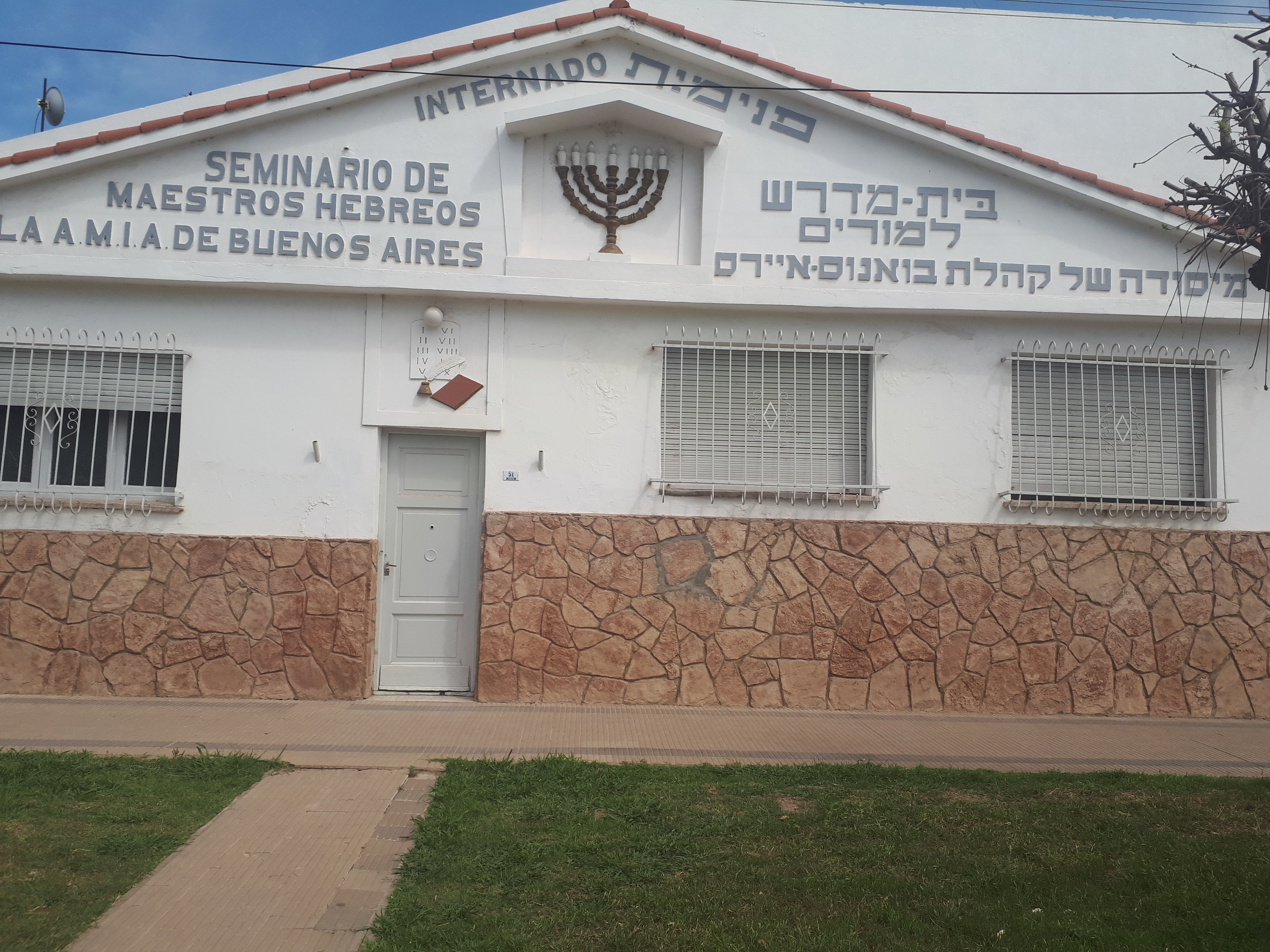
Former building of the Hebrew Teachers' Seminar

== Notable people ==
- Mika Feldman de Etchebéhère
- Alberto Gerchunoff
- Rosa Tarlovsky de Roisinblit

== See also ==
- History of the Jews in Argentina
- Jewish Colonization Association
- Jewish gauchos
- Immigration in Argentina
- Synagogues of Moises Ville

== Bibliography ==
- Braunstein, Gabriel. The Jewish immigration to Entre Rios, Argentina. JGSR News, Jewish Genealogical Society of Rochester.
- Cociovitch, Noé (1987). Génesis de Moisés Ville. Buenos Aires: Editorial Milá.
- Zablotsky, Edgardo (May 2005). The Project of The Baron de Hirsch: Success or failure?.
- Armony, Paul (July 1997). Moisesville: The Jewish Pioneer Colony. AGJA's magazine.
- Sofer, Eugene (October 1984). From Pale to Pampa: A Social History of the Jews of Buenos Aires. Modern Judaism.
- Weisbrot, Robert (1979). The Jews of Argentina from the Inquisition to Peron.
- Avni, Haim. Argentina & the Jews: A History of Jewish Immigration (English translation by Gila Brand).
