= SS Weser (1867) =

History

German Empire
- Name: Weser (1867-96); Seravalle (1896))
- Namesake: Weser River
- Owner: North German Lloyd
- Port of registry: Bremen (1867-71); (German Empire) Bremen, Germany (1871-96); Italy (1896)
- Builder: Caird & Company of Greenock, Scotland
- Way number: 137
- Launched: May 19, 1867
- Maiden voyage: June 1, 1867; Bremen-Southampton-New York
- Renamed: Seravalle
- Refit: 1891
- Homeport: Bremen
- Fate: Scrapped, August 1896

General characteristics
- Type: Passenger-cargo ship
- Tonnage: 2,870 GRT, 2,139 NRT
- Length: 357 ft 0 in (108.81 m)
- Beam: 41 ft 0 in (12.50 m)
- Depth: 26 ft 0 in (7.92 m)
- Installed power: 2-cylinder steam engine 750 horsepower (560 kW) (1867-81); 2 cylinder compound steam engine (1881-96)
- Propulsion: Single screw propeller
- Sail plan: Two masts
- Speed: 11 kn (20 km/h; 13 mph); After 1891 refit: 13.5 kn (25.0 km/h; 15.5 mph)
- Complement: 880 passengers

Weser was an ocean liner built in 1867 for North German Lloyd. She was sold to Italy in 1896 and was renamed Seravalle, being scrapped in that year.

== Description ==
The ship was 357 feet 0 inches (108.81 m) long, with a beam of 41 feet 0 inches (12.50 m) and a depth of 26 feet 0 inches (7.92 m). She was powered by a 2-cylinder inverted steam engine driving a single screw propeller. The engine had cylinders of 72 inches (180 cm) diameter by 48 inches (120 cm) stroke, developing 750 horsepower (560 kW).

== History ==
Weser was built as yard number 137 by Caird & Company of Greenock, Scotland for North German Lloyd. She entered service on the Bremen-Southampton-New York-Baltimore route on 1 June 1867. On 7 August 1870, she ran aground in the Solent at the entrance to the Southampton Water. She was on a voyage from Bremen to New York, United States. She was refloated with assistance from the paddle tug Camel. In 1881, her engine was compounded. On 13 June 1895, she was transferred to the Bremen-South America service for two roundtrip voyages. She was sold to an Italian company in June 1896. She was renamed Seravalle. The ship was scrapped in August 1896 in Genoa, Italy.
