= Rivera, Buenos Aires =

Rivera
- settlement
- Location in Argentina
- Coordinates: 37°09′38.77″S 63°14′48.61″W
- Country: Argentina
- Province: Buenos Aires
- Partido: Adolfo Alsina
- Elevation: 127 m (417 ft)

Population (2001)
  - Total: 3,036
- Time zone: UTC−3 (ART)
- Postal Code: BUE001

Rivera is a settlement located near the town of Carhué in the southwest region of the Province of Buenos Aires, Argentina, in Adolfo Alsina Partido. Rivera was founded by Jewish immigrants who came from Russia, Poland and other parts of Eastern Europe at the beginning of 20th century.

== History ==
During the first decade of the 20th century, Jews persecuted by Czar Nicholas II of Russia began arriving to Argentina from various parts of the world. They settled down mainly in the provinces of Entre Rios and Santa Fe, in colonies established by the Jewish Colonization Association, which was based in London and directed by Baron Maurice de Hirsch.

Many of these settlers established themselves in the fields around Rivera. Initially, a little more than 70 families moved to the area. Through years of perseverance and hard work, they transformed the poor soil into fertile land, making the area prosperous. By 2006, Rivera had nearly 3,000 inhabitants.
