= Ginamaría Hidalgo =

Argentine singer

Virginia Rosaura Hidalgo (August 23, 1927 – February 10, 2004), better known by the stage name Ginamaría Hidalgo, was an Argentine light-lyric soprano singer.
