= Stadt Hannover I =

Federal electoral district of Germany

41 Stadt Hannover I
- Electoral district for the Bundestag
- Stadt Hannover I in 2025
- State: Lower Saxony
- Population: 260,100 (2019)
- Electorate: 176,770 (2021)
- Major settlements: Hanover (partial)
- Area: 112.9 km^{2}

Current electoral district
- Created: 1949
- Party: SPD
- Member: Adis Ahmetovic
- Elected: 2021, 2025

Stadt Hannover I (English: Hanover City 1) is an electoral constituency (German: Wahlkreis) represented in the Bundestag. It elects one member via first-past-the-post voting. Under the current constituency numbering system, it is designated as constituency 41. It is located in central Lower Saxony, comprising the northern part of the city of Hanover.

Stadt Hannover I was created for the inaugural 1949 federal election. Since 2021, it has been represented by Adis Ahmetovic of the Social Democratic Party (SPD).

== Geography ==
Stadt Hannover I is located in central Lower Saxony. As of the 2021 federal election, it comprises the northern part of the city of Hanover, specifically the districts of Bothfeld-Vahrenheide, Buchholz-Kleefeld, Mitte (excluding Mitte and Calenberger Neustadt), Herrenhausen-Stöcken (excluding Herrenhausen), Misburg-Anderten, Nord (excluding Nordstadt), and Vahrenwald-List.

== History ==
Stadt Hannover I was created in 1949, then known as Stadt Hannover-Nord. In the 1965 through 1976 elections, it was named Hannover I. It acquired its current name in the 1980 election. In the inaugural Bundestag election, it was Lower Saxony constituency 18 in the numbering system. From 1953 through 1961, it was number 40. From 1965 through 1998, it was number 36. In the 2002 and 2005 elections, it was number 41. In the 2009 election, it was number 42. Since the 2013 election, it has been number 41.

Originally, the constituency comprised the city quarters of Buchholz, Hainholz, Herrenhausen, Stöcken, List, Vahrenwald, and Mitte. In the 1965 through 1976 elections, it comprised the area of the city north of the Seelze–Hannover Hauptbahnhof–Lehrte railway line. It acquired its current borders in the 1980 election.

Election	No.	Name	Borders
1949	18	Stadt Hannover-Nord	Hanover city (only Buchholz, Hainholz, Herrenhausen, Stöcken, List, Vahrenwald, and Mitte quarters)
1953	40	Stadt Hannover-Nord	Hanover city (only Buchholz, Hainholz, Herrenhausen, Stöcken, List, Vahrenwald, and Mitte quarters)
1957	40	Stadt Hannover-Nord	Hanover city (only Buchholz, Hainholz, Herrenhausen, Stöcken, List, Vahrenwald, and Mitte quarters)
1961	40	Stadt Hannover-Nord	Hanover city (only Buchholz, Hainholz, Herrenhausen, Stöcken, List, Vahrenwald, and Mitte quarters)
1965	36	Hannover I	Hanover city (only the area north of the Seelze–Hannover Hauptbahnhof–Lehrte railway line)
1969	36	Hannover I	Hanover city (only the area north of the Seelze–Hannover Hauptbahnhof–Lehrte railway line)
1972	36	Hannover I	Hanover city (only the area north of the Seelze–Hannover Hauptbahnhof–Lehrte railway line)
1976	36	Hannover I	Hanover city (only the area north of the Seelze–Hannover Hauptbahnhof–Lehrte railway line)
1980	36	Stadt Hannover I	Hanover city (only Bothfeld-Vahrenheide, Buchholz-Kleefeld, Mitte (excluding Mitte and Calenberger Neustadt), Herrenhausen-Stöcken (excluding Herrenhausen), Misburg-Anderten, Nord (excluding Nordstadt), and Vahrenwald-List districts)
1983	36	Stadt Hannover I	Hanover city (only Bothfeld-Vahrenheide, Buchholz-Kleefeld, Mitte (excluding Mitte and Calenberger Neustadt), Herrenhausen-Stöcken (excluding Herrenhausen), Misburg-Anderten, Nord (excluding Nordstadt), and Vahrenwald-List districts)
1987	36	Stadt Hannover I	Hanover city (only Bothfeld-Vahrenheide, Buchholz-Kleefeld, Mitte (excluding Mitte and Calenberger Neustadt), Herrenhausen-Stöcken (excluding Herrenhausen), Misburg-Anderten, Nord (excluding Nordstadt), and Vahrenwald-List districts)
1990	36	Stadt Hannover I	Hanover city (only Bothfeld-Vahrenheide, Buchholz-Kleefeld, Mitte (excluding Mitte and Calenberger Neustadt), Herrenhausen-Stöcken (excluding Herrenhausen), Misburg-Anderten, Nord (excluding Nordstadt), and Vahrenwald-List districts)
1994	36	Stadt Hannover I	Hanover city (only Bothfeld-Vahrenheide, Buchholz-Kleefeld, Mitte (excluding Mitte and Calenberger Neustadt), Herrenhausen-Stöcken (excluding Herrenhausen), Misburg-Anderten, Nord (excluding Nordstadt), and Vahrenwald-List districts)
1998	36	Stadt Hannover I	Hanover city (only Bothfeld-Vahrenheide, Buchholz-Kleefeld, Mitte (excluding Mitte and Calenberger Neustadt), Herrenhausen-Stöcken (excluding Herrenhausen), Misburg-Anderten, Nord (excluding Nordstadt), and Vahrenwald-List districts)
2002	41	Stadt Hannover I	Hanover city (only Bothfeld-Vahrenheide, Buchholz-Kleefeld, Mitte (excluding Mitte and Calenberger Neustadt), Herrenhausen-Stöcken (excluding Herrenhausen), Misburg-Anderten, Nord (excluding Nordstadt), and Vahrenwald-List districts)
2005	41	Stadt Hannover I	Hanover city (only Bothfeld-Vahrenheide, Buchholz-Kleefeld, Mitte (excluding Mitte and Calenberger Neustadt), Herrenhausen-Stöcken (excluding Herrenhausen), Misburg-Anderten, Nord (excluding Nordstadt), and Vahrenwald-List districts)
2009	42	Stadt Hannover I	Hanover city (only Bothfeld-Vahrenheide, Buchholz-Kleefeld, Mitte (excluding Mitte and Calenberger Neustadt), Herrenhausen-Stöcken (excluding Herrenhausen), Misburg-Anderten, Nord (excluding Nordstadt), and Vahrenwald-List districts)
2013	41	Stadt Hannover I	Hanover city (only Bothfeld-Vahrenheide, Buchholz-Kleefeld, Mitte (excluding Mitte and Calenberger Neustadt), Herrenhausen-Stöcken (excluding Herrenhausen), Misburg-Anderten, Nord (excluding Nordstadt), and Vahrenwald-List districts)
2017	41	Stadt Hannover I	Hanover city (only Bothfeld-Vahrenheide, Buchholz-Kleefeld, Mitte (excluding Mitte and Calenberger Neustadt), Herrenhausen-Stöcken (excluding Herrenhausen), Misburg-Anderten, Nord (excluding Nordstadt), and Vahrenwald-List districts)
2021	41	Stadt Hannover I	Hanover city (only Bothfeld-Vahrenheide, Buchholz-Kleefeld, Mitte (excluding Mitte and Calenberger Neustadt), Herrenhausen-Stöcken (excluding Herrenhausen), Misburg-Anderten, Nord (excluding Nordstadt), and Vahrenwald-List districts)
2025	41	Stadt Hannover I	Hanover city (only Bothfeld-Vahrenheide, Buchholz-Kleefeld, Mitte (excluding Mitte and Calenberger Neustadt), Herrenhausen-Stöcken (excluding Herrenhausen), Misburg-Anderten, Nord (excluding Nordstadt), and Vahrenwald-List districts)

== Members ==
The constituency has been held by the Social Democratic Party (SPD) during all but one Bundestag term since 1949. Its first representative was Bruno Leddin of the SPD, who served from 1949 until his death in 1951. Egon Franke won the resulting by-election, and served until 1957, when Adolf Cillien of the Christian Democratic Union (CDU) won the constituency. Franke won it back in 1961, and went on to serve until 1987. He was succeeded by Gerd Andres, who served from 1987 to 2009. Kerstin Tack was elected in 2009, and re-elected in 2013 and 2017. She was succeeded by Adis Ahmetovic in 2021.

Election	Member	Party	%
1949	Bruno Leddin	SPD	44.1
1951	Egon Franke	SPD	52.9
1953	Egon Franke	SPD	38.8
1957	Adolf Cillien	CDU	44.9
1961	Egon Franke	SPD	44.1
1965	Egon Franke	SPD	50.2
1969	Egon Franke	SPD	55.8
1972	Egon Franke	SPD	58.5
1976	Egon Franke	SPD	52.9
1980	Egon Franke	SPD	53.7
1983	Egon Franke	SPD	46.9
1987	Gerd Andres	SPD	46.1
1990	Gerd Andres	SPD	43.7
1994	Gerd Andres	SPD	44.3
1998	Gerd Andres	SPD	54.6
2002	Gerd Andres	SPD	55.5
2005	Gerd Andres	SPD	52.8
2009	Kerstin Tack	SPD	39.0
2013	Kerstin Tack	SPD	43.5
2017	Kerstin Tack	SPD	35.6
2021	Adis Ahmetovic	SPD	34.9
2025	Adis Ahmetovic	SPD	34.1

== Election results ==
=== 2025 election ===
Federal election (2025): Stadt Hannover I
Notes:	Blue background denotes the winner of the electorate vote. Pink background denotes a candidate elected from their party list. Yellow background denotes an electorate win by a list member, or other incumbent. A ✓ or ✗ denotes status of any incumbent, win or lose respectively.						
Party	Candidate	Votes	%	±%	Party votes	%	±%
SPD	✓ Adis Ahmetovic	48,668	34.1	▼0.8	33,839	23.7	▼7.3
CDU	Michaela Menschel	32,818	23.0	▲1.6	30,595	21.4	▲3.1
Greens	Timon Dzienus	22,397	15.7	▼6.1	25,754	18.0	▼5.8
AfD	Jörn König	18,719	13.1	▲7.2	18,414	12.9	▲6.9
Left	Martina Hamich	12,063	8.5	▲4.8	17,019	11.9	▲7.4
BSW					6,422	4.5	
FDP	Joris-Colin Stietenroth	3,994	2.8	▼4.7	6,177	4.3	▼6.1
Volt	Joana Zahl	1,908	1.3		1,202	0.8	▲0.3
Tierschutzpartei					1,417	1.0	▼0.1
FW	Frank Weber	1,077	0.8	▲0.1	529	0.4	▼0.2
Pirates	Reiner Budnick	728	0.5	▼0.1	326	0.2	▼0.3
PARTEI					659	0.5	▼0.4
MLPD	Anke Nierstenhöfer	324	0.2	▲0.1	82	0.1	0.0
dieBasis					249	0.2	▼0.8
BD					147	0.1	
Humanists					125	0.1	▼0.1
Informal votes		1,063			803		
Total valid votes		142,696			142,956		
Turnout		143,759	82.0	▲9.0			
SPD hold	Majority	15,850	11.1	▼2.0			

=== 2021 election ===
Federal election (2021): Stadt Hannover I
Notes:	Blue background denotes the winner of the electorate vote. Pink background denotes a candidate elected from their party list. Yellow background denotes an electorate win by a list member, or other incumbent. A ✓ or ✗ denotes status of any incumbent, win or lose respectively.						
Party	Candidate	Votes	%	±%	Party votes	%	±%
SPD	Adis Ahmetovic	44,538	34.9	▼0.8	39,511	31.0	▲3.6
Greens	Swantje Michaelsen	27,851	21.8	▲12.7	30,360	23.8	▲11.6
CDU	Maximilian Oppelt	27,303	21.4	▼8.2	23,410	18.3	▼8.8
FDP	Katharina Wieking	9,550	7.5	▲0.9	13,282	10.4	▲0.2
AfD	Jörn König	7,549	5.9	▼2.6	7,677	6.0	▼3.1
Left	Hans-Herbert Ullrich	4,662	3.7	▼3.5	5,768	4.5	▼4.8
PARTEI	Jens Bolm	1,586	1.2	▼0.6	1,161	0.9	▼0.4
Tierschutzpartei	Corinna Günther	1,528	1.2		1,400	1.1	▲0.2
dieBasis	Karl-Heinz Bader	1,265	1.0		1,192	0.9	
Team Todenhöfer					1,073	0.8	
FW	Ronald Rüdiger	847	0.7	▲0.2	691	0.5	▲0.2
Pirates	Reiner Budnick	746	0.6	▼0.3	681	0.5	0.0
Volt					674	0.5	
Humanists					180	0.1	
V-Partei3					121	0.1	▼0.1
ÖDP	Iko Schneider	138	0.1		103	0.1	0.0
NPD					87	0.1	▼0.1
du.					72	0.1	
DKP					63	0.0	0.0
MLPD	Anke Nierstenhöfer	114	0.1	0.0	55	0.0	0.0
LKR					25	0.0	
Informal votes		1,217			1,308		
Total valid votes		127,677			127,586		
Turnout		128,894	72.9	▼2.0			
SPD hold	Majority	16,687	13.1	▲7.1			

=== 2017 election ===
Federal election (2017): Stadt Hannover I
Notes:	Blue background denotes the winner of the electorate vote. Pink background denotes a candidate elected from their party list. Yellow background denotes an electorate win by a list member, or other incumbent. A ✓ or ✗ denotes status of any incumbent, win or lose respectively.						
Party	Candidate	Votes	%	±%	Party votes	%	±%
SPD	✓ Kerstin Tack	47,549	35.6	▼7.9	36,645	27.4	▼8.1
CDU	Maximilian Oppelt	39,487	29.6	▼6.9	36,401	27.2	▼6.3
Greens	Swantje Michaelsen	12,102	9.1	▲1.4	16,292	12.2	▼0.1
AfD	Jörn König	11,364	8.5	▲5.4	12,226	9.1	▲5.5
Left	Hans-Herbert Ullrich	9,579	7.2	▲2.2	12,470	9.3	▲3.1
FDP	Claudia Winterstein	8,734	6.5	▲5.1	13,658	10.2	▲5.5
PARTEI	Jens Manuel Bolm	2,401	1.8		1,768	1.3	
Pirates	Christian Vey	1,231	0.9	▼1.0	768	0.6	▼1.3
Tierschutzpartei					1,222	0.9	▲0.1
FW	Claas Donat Osterloh	668	0.5	▼0.1	409	0.3	▼0.1
DM					545	0.4	
BGE					365	0.3	
DiB					297	0.2	
NPD					244	0.2	▼0.4
V-Partei³					220	0.2	
ÖDP					162	0.1	
MLPD	Anke Nierstenhöfer	163	0.1	0.0	78	0.1	0.0
DKP	Frank Georg Braun	137	0.1		79	0.1	
Informal votes		1,390			956		
Total valid votes		133,415			133,849		
Turnout		134,805	74.9	▲3.2			
SPD hold	Majority	8,062	6.0	▼1.0			

=== 2013 election ===
Federal election (2013): Stadt Hannover I
Notes:	Blue background denotes the winner of the electorate vote. Pink background denotes a candidate elected from their party list. Yellow background denotes an electorate win by a list member, or other incumbent. A ✓ or ✗ denotes status of any incumbent, win or lose respectively.						
Party	Candidate	Votes	%	±%	Party votes	%	±%
SPD	✓ Kerstin Tack	55,711	43.5	▲4.6	45,441	35.5	▲4.3
CDU	Wilfried Lorenz	46,650	36.5	▲3.6	42,910	33.5	▲7.0
Greens	Silvia Klingenburg-Pülm	9,876	7.7	▼2.6	15,718	12.3	▼2.4
Left	Oliver Förste	6,435	5.0	▼3.2	7,993	6.2	▼3.1
AfD	Matthias Dorn	4,051	3.2		4,654	3.6	
Pirates	Reiner Budnick	2,434	1.9		2,434	1.9	▼0.5
FDP	Thomas Iseke	1,889	1.5	▼6.0	6,043	4.7	▼8.1
Tierschutzpartei					988	0.8	▼0.1
NPD					808	0.6	▼0.7
FW	Bettina Redöhl	790	0.6		505	0.4	
PRO					168	0.1	
MLPD	Kurt-Peter Kleffel	143	0.1	0.0	78	0.1	0.0
PBC					137	0.1	
REP					122	0.1	
Informal votes		1,888			1,868		
Total valid votes		127,979			127,999		
Turnout		129,867	71.7	▼1.2			
SPD hold	Majority	9,061	7.0	▲0.9			

=== 2009 election ===
Federal election (2009): Stadt Hannover I
Notes:	Blue background denotes the winner of the electorate vote. Pink background denotes a candidate elected from their party list. Yellow background denotes an electorate win by a list member, or other incumbent. A ✓ or ✗ denotes status of any incumbent, win or lose respectively.						
Party	Candidate	Votes	%	±%	Party votes	%	±%
SPD	Kerstin Tack	50,592	39.0	▼13.9	40,497	31.2	▼15.3
CDU	Rita Pawelski	42,621	32.8	▲1.0	34,448	26.5	▲0.3
Greens	Carolin Friedemann	13,364	10.3	▲4.3	19,019	14.6	▲3.6
Left	Michael Höntsch	10,624	8.2	▲4.2	12,111	9.3	▲4.5
FDP	Claudia Winterstein	9,699	7.5	▲3.6	16,680	12.8	▲3.9
Pirates					3,102	2.4	
NPD	Olaf Klanke	1,759	1.4	▲0.1	1,681	1.3	▲0.1
Tierschutzpartei					1,081	0.8	▲0.3
RRP	Renate Rodriguez Gómez	978	0.8		973	0.7	
ÖDP					190	0.1	
MLPD	Kurt-Peter Kleffel	176	0.1	0.0	88	0.1	0.0
DVU					118	0.1	
Informal votes		1,556			1,381		
Total valid votes		129,813			129,988		
Turnout		131,369	72.9	▼5.3			
SPD hold	Majority	7,971	6.1	▼15.0			

=== 2005 election ===
Federal election (2005):Stadt Hannover I
Notes:	Blue background denotes the winner of the electorate vote. Pink background denotes a candidate elected from their party list. Yellow background denotes an electorate win by a list member, or other incumbent. A ✓ or ✗ denotes status of any incumbent, win or lose respectively.						
Party	Candidate	Votes	%	±%	Party votes	%	±%
SPD	✓ Gerd Andres	73,195	52.8	▼2.6	64,477	46.4	▼4.5
CDU	Rita Pawelski	44,061	31.8	▲1.3	36,313	26.2	▼1.8
Greens	Christopher Bodirsky	8,333	6.0	▲0.2	15,356	11.1	0.0
Left	Andreas Brändle	5,565	4.0	▲2.7	6,666	4.8	▲3.4
FDP	Claudia Winterstein	5,419	3.9	▼1.1	12,349	8.9	▲2.6
NPD	Thomas Warnat	1,731	1.2		1,658	1.2	▲1.0
Tierschutzpartei					749	0.5	▲0.2
GRAUEN					686	0.5	▲0.3
PBC					312	0.2	0.0
MLPD	Kurt-Peter Kieffel	207	0.1		92	0.1	
Pro German Center – Pro D-Mark Initiative					86	0.1	
BüSo					74	0.1	0.0
Informal votes		1,855			1,548		
Total valid votes		138,511			138,818		
Turnout		140,366	78.3	▼1.6			
SPD hold	Majority	29,134	21				
