= Stadt Hannover II =

Federal electoral district of Germany

42 Stadt Hannover II
- Electoral district for the Bundestag
- Stadt Hannover II in 2025
- State: Lower Saxony
- Population: 276,800 (2019)
- Electorate: 190,336 (2017)
- Major settlements: Hanover (partial)
- Area: 91.4 km^{2}

Current electoral district
- Created: 1949
- Party: SPD
- Member: Boris Pistorius
- Elected: 2025

Stadt Hannover II (English: Hanover City 2) is an electoral constituency (German: Wahlkreis) represented in the Bundestag. It elects one member via first-past-the-post voting. Under the current constituency numbering system, it is designated as constituency 42. It is located in central Lower Saxony, comprising the southern part of the city of Hanover.

Stadt Hannover II was created for the inaugural 1949 federal election. Since 2025, it has been represented by Boris Pistorius of the Social Democratic Party (SPD).

== Geography ==
Stadt Hannover II is located in central Lower Saxony. As of the 2021 federal election, it comprises the northern part of the city of Hanover, specifically the districts of Ahlem-Badenstedt-Davenstedt, Döhren-Wülfel, Mitte (excluding Oststadt and Zoo), Herrenhausen-Stöcken (only Herrenhausen), Kirchrode-Bemerode-Wülferode, Linden-Limmer, Nord (only Nordstadt), Ricklingen, and Südstadt-Built.

== History ==
Stadt Hannover II was created in 1949, then known as Stadt Hannover-Süd. In the 1965 through 1976 elections, it was named Hannover II. It acquired its current name in the 1980 election. In the inaugural Bundestag election, it was Lower Saxony constituency 19 in the numbering system. From 1953 through 1961, it was number 41. From 1965 through 1998, it was number 37. In the 2002 and 2005 elections, it was number 42. In the 2009 election, it was number 43. Since the 2013 election, it has been number 42.

Originally, the constituency comprised the city quarters of Badenstedt, Döhren, Wülfel, Kirchrode, Kleefeld, Limmer, Linden, and Ricklingen. In the 1965 through 1976 elections, it comprised the area of the city south of the Seelze–Hannover Hauptbahnhof–Lehrte railway line. It acquired its current borders in the 1980 election.

Election	No.	Name	Borders
1949	19	Stadt Hannover-Süd	Hanover city (only Badenstedt, Döhren, Wülfel, Kirchrode, Kleefeld, Limmer, Linden, and Ricklingen quarters)
1953	41	Stadt Hannover-Süd	Hanover city (only Badenstedt, Döhren, Wülfel, Kirchrode, Kleefeld, Limmer, Linden, and Ricklingen quarters)
1957	41	Stadt Hannover-Süd	Hanover city (only Badenstedt, Döhren, Wülfel, Kirchrode, Kleefeld, Limmer, Linden, and Ricklingen quarters)
1961	41	Stadt Hannover-Süd	Hanover city (only Badenstedt, Döhren, Wülfel, Kirchrode, Kleefeld, Limmer, Linden, and Ricklingen quarters)
1965	37	Hannover II	Hanover city (only the area south of the Seelze–Hannover Hauptbahnhof–Lehrte railway line)
1969	37	Hannover II	Hanover city (only the area south of the Seelze–Hannover Hauptbahnhof–Lehrte railway line)
1972	37	Hannover II	Hanover city (only the area south of the Seelze–Hannover Hauptbahnhof–Lehrte railway line)
1976	37	Hannover II	Hanover city (only the area south of the Seelze–Hannover Hauptbahnhof–Lehrte railway line)
1980	37	Stadt Hannover II	Hanover city (only Ahlem-Badenstedt-Davenstedt, Döhren-Wülfel, Mitte (excluding Oststadt and Zoo), Herrenhausen-Stöcken (only Herrenhausen), Kirchrode-Bemerode-Wülferode, Linden-Limmer, Nord (only Nordstadt), Ricklingen, and Südstadt-Built districts)
1983	37	Stadt Hannover II	Hanover city (only Ahlem-Badenstedt-Davenstedt, Döhren-Wülfel, Mitte (excluding Oststadt and Zoo), Herrenhausen-Stöcken (only Herrenhausen), Kirchrode-Bemerode-Wülferode, Linden-Limmer, Nord (only Nordstadt), Ricklingen, and Südstadt-Built districts)
1987	37	Stadt Hannover II	Hanover city (only Ahlem-Badenstedt-Davenstedt, Döhren-Wülfel, Mitte (excluding Oststadt and Zoo), Herrenhausen-Stöcken (only Herrenhausen), Kirchrode-Bemerode-Wülferode, Linden-Limmer, Nord (only Nordstadt), Ricklingen, and Südstadt-Built districts)
1990	37	Stadt Hannover II	Hanover city (only Ahlem-Badenstedt-Davenstedt, Döhren-Wülfel, Mitte (excluding Oststadt and Zoo), Herrenhausen-Stöcken (only Herrenhausen), Kirchrode-Bemerode-Wülferode, Linden-Limmer, Nord (only Nordstadt), Ricklingen, and Südstadt-Built districts)
1994	37	Stadt Hannover II	Hanover city (only Ahlem-Badenstedt-Davenstedt, Döhren-Wülfel, Mitte (excluding Oststadt and Zoo), Herrenhausen-Stöcken (only Herrenhausen), Kirchrode-Bemerode-Wülferode, Linden-Limmer, Nord (only Nordstadt), Ricklingen, and Südstadt-Built districts)
1998	37	Stadt Hannover II	Hanover city (only Ahlem-Badenstedt-Davenstedt, Döhren-Wülfel, Mitte (excluding Oststadt and Zoo), Herrenhausen-Stöcken (only Herrenhausen), Kirchrode-Bemerode-Wülferode, Linden-Limmer, Nord (only Nordstadt), Ricklingen, and Südstadt-Built districts)
2002	42	Stadt Hannover II	Hanover city (only Ahlem-Badenstedt-Davenstedt, Döhren-Wülfel, Mitte (excluding Oststadt and Zoo), Herrenhausen-Stöcken (only Herrenhausen), Kirchrode-Bemerode-Wülferode, Linden-Limmer, Nord (only Nordstadt), Ricklingen, and Südstadt-Built districts)
2005	42	Stadt Hannover II	Hanover city (only Ahlem-Badenstedt-Davenstedt, Döhren-Wülfel, Mitte (excluding Oststadt and Zoo), Herrenhausen-Stöcken (only Herrenhausen), Kirchrode-Bemerode-Wülferode, Linden-Limmer, Nord (only Nordstadt), Ricklingen, and Südstadt-Built districts)
2009	43	Stadt Hannover II	Hanover city (only Ahlem-Badenstedt-Davenstedt, Döhren-Wülfel, Mitte (excluding Oststadt and Zoo), Herrenhausen-Stöcken (only Herrenhausen), Kirchrode-Bemerode-Wülferode, Linden-Limmer, Nord (only Nordstadt), Ricklingen, and Südstadt-Built districts)
2013	42	Stadt Hannover II	Hanover city (only Ahlem-Badenstedt-Davenstedt, Döhren-Wülfel, Mitte (excluding Oststadt and Zoo), Herrenhausen-Stöcken (only Herrenhausen), Kirchrode-Bemerode-Wülferode, Linden-Limmer, Nord (only Nordstadt), Ricklingen, and Südstadt-Built districts)
2017	42	Stadt Hannover II	Hanover city (only Ahlem-Badenstedt-Davenstedt, Döhren-Wülfel, Mitte (excluding Oststadt and Zoo), Herrenhausen-Stöcken (only Herrenhausen), Kirchrode-Bemerode-Wülferode, Linden-Limmer, Nord (only Nordstadt), Ricklingen, and Südstadt-Built districts)
2021	42	Stadt Hannover II	Hanover city (only Ahlem-Badenstedt-Davenstedt, Döhren-Wülfel, Mitte (excluding Oststadt and Zoo), Herrenhausen-Stöcken (only Herrenhausen), Kirchrode-Bemerode-Wülferode, Linden-Limmer, Nord (only Nordstadt), Ricklingen, and Südstadt-Built districts)
2025	42	Stadt Hannover II	Hanover city (only Ahlem-Badenstedt-Davenstedt, Döhren-Wülfel, Mitte (excluding Oststadt and Zoo), Herrenhausen-Stöcken (only Herrenhausen), Kirchrode-Bemerode-Wülferode, Linden-Limmer, Nord (only Nordstadt), Ricklingen, and Südstadt-Built districts)

== Members ==
The constituency has been held continuously by the Social Democratic Party (SPD) since its creation. Its first representative was Kurt Schumacher, the first post-war leader of the SPD, who served from 1949 until his death in 1952. Ernst Winter won the resulting by-election, and served less than a year before being succeeded by new SPD leader Erich Ollenhauer in the 1953 federal election. He served until his death in 1963. Helmut Rohde was elected in the 1965 election, and served until 1987. He was succeeded by Edelgard Bulmahn. In 2017, she was succeeded by Yasmin Fahimi, who was re-elected in 2021.

Election	Member	Party	%
1949	Kurt Schumacher	SPD	55.1
1952	Ernst Winter	SPD	59.8
1953	Erich Ollenhauer	SPD	51.9
1957	Erich Ollenhauer	SPD	52.1
1961	Erich Ollenhauer	SPD	53.9
1965	Helmut Rohde	SPD	51.0
1969	Helmut Rohde	SPD	57.2
1972	Helmut Rohde	SPD	59.8
1976	Helmut Rohde	SPD	54.6
1980	Helmut Rohde	SPD	53.3
1983	Helmut Rohde	SPD	49.1
1987	Edelgard Bulmahn	SPD	46.3
1990	Edelgard Bulmahn	SPD	44.0
1994	Edelgard Bulmahn	SPD	45.1
1998	Edelgard Bulmahn	SPD	53.6
2002	Edelgard Bulmahn	SPD	56.3
2005	Edelgard Bulmahn	SPD	54.3
2009	Edelgard Bulmahn	SPD	39.6
2013	Edelgard Bulmahn	SPD	42.8
2017	Yasmin Fahimi	SPD	33.7
2021	Yasmin Fahimi	SPD	32.9
2025	Boris Pistorius	SPD	36.2

== Election results ==
=== 2025 election ===
Federal election (2025): Stadt Hannover II
Notes:	Blue background denotes the winner of the electorate vote. Pink background denotes a candidate elected from their party list. Yellow background denotes an electorate win by a list member, or other incumbent. A ✓ or ✗ denotes status of any incumbent, win or lose respectively.						
Party	Candidate	Votes	%	±%	Party votes	%	±%
SPD	Boris Pistorius	57,216	36.2	▲3.3	34,913	22.1	▼6.1
Greens	Swantje Michaelsen	30,166	19.1	▼7.4	33,650	21.3	▼8.2
CDU	Fabian Becker	28,168	17.8	▼0.6	29,685	19.8	▲2.9
Left	Maren Kaminski	17,908	11.3	▲6.3	26,100	16.5	▲10.3
AfD	Micha Fehre	16,190	10.2	▲5.7	16,411	10.4	▲5.6
FDP	Robert Reinhardt-Klein	3,769	2.4	▼4.3	6,136	3.9	▼5.5
Volt	Andreas Badenhop	1,529	1.0		1,460	0.9	▲0.3
PARTEI	Felix Ruiz	1,516	1.0	▼0.7	859	0.5	▼0.7
FW	Andreas Hey	863	0.5	▼0.1	529	0.3	▼0.2
Pirates	Thomas Ganskow	491	0.3	▼0.4	345	0.2	▼0.3
MLPD	Kurt-Peter Kleffel	249	0.2	▲0.1	82	0.1	0.0
BSW					6,145	3.9	
Tierschutzpartei				▼1.4	1,446	0.9	▲0.1
dieBasis				▼1.1	220	0.1	▼0.9
BD					149	0.1	
Humanists				▼0.2	140	0.1	▼0.1
Team Todenhöfer							▼0.8
ÖDP							▼0.1
Informal votes		987			782		
Total valid votes		158,065			158,270		
Turnout		159,052	83.8	▲8.3			
SPD hold	Majority	27,050	17.1	▲3.3			

=== 2021 election ===
Federal election (2021): Stadt Hannover II
Notes:	Blue background denotes the winner of the electorate vote. Pink background denotes a candidate elected from their party list. Yellow background denotes an electorate win by a list member, or other incumbent. A ✓ or ✗ denotes status of any incumbent, win or lose respectively.						
Party	Candidate	Votes	%	±%	Party votes	%	±%
SPD	✓ Yasmin Fahimi	46,929	32.9	▼0.8	40,116	28.2	▲2.5
Greens	Sven-Christian Kindler	37,779	26.5	▲15.3	41,976	29.5	▲14.6
CDU	Diana Rieck-Vogt	26,196	18.4	▼10.6	22,537	15.8	▼8.6
FDP	Knut Gerschau	9,538	6.7	▲1.2	13,288	9.3	▼0.6
Left	Parwaneh Bokah	7,390	5.2	▼4.1	8,831	6.2	▼5.8
AfD	Reinhard Hirche	6,476	4.5	▼2.6	6,753	4.7	▼2.8
PARTEI	Juli Klippert	2,428	1.7	▼1.1	1,705	1.2	▼0.8
Tierschutzpartei	Christian Wulff	1,937	1.4		1,479	1.0	▲0.1
dieBasis	Niels Heinrich	1,568	1.1		1,440	1.0	
Team Todenhöfer					1,070	0.8	
Volt					931	0.7	
Pirates	Thomas Ganskow	979	0.7	▼0.3	759	0.5	▼0.1
FW	Andreas Hey	875	0.6		698	0.5	▲0.3
Humanists	Eduard Kirschmann	287	0.2		199	0.1	
V-Partei3					189	0.1	▼0.1
ÖDP					122	0.1	0.0
du.					109	0.1	
DKP					89	0.1	0.0
MLPD	Käthe Kleffel	146	0.1	▼0.1	70	0.0	0.0
NPD					59	0.0	▼0.1
LKR					20	0.0	
Informal votes		1,184			1,262		
Total valid votes		142,528			142,450		
Turnout		143,712	75.5	▼1.5			
SPD hold	Majority	9,150	6.4	▲2.3			

=== 2017 election ===
Federal election (2017): Stadt Hannover II
Notes:	Blue background denotes the winner of the electorate vote. Pink background denotes a candidate elected from their party list. Yellow background denotes an electorate win by a list member, or other incumbent. A ✓ or ✗ denotes status of any incumbent, win or lose respectively.						
Party	Candidate	Votes	%	±%	Party votes	%	±%
SPD	Yasmin Fahimi	49,744	33.7	▼9.1	37,964	25.6	▼9.0
CDU	Ursula von der Leyen	42,713	28.9	▼4.9	36,203	24.4	▼5.5
Greens	Sven-Christian Kindler	16,486	11.2	▲1.0	22,079	14.9	▼0.6
Left	Parwaneh Bokah	13,775	9.3	▲3.1	17,823	12.0	▲4.0
AfD	Herbert Klever	10,590	7.2	▲4.4	11,241	7.6	▲4.2
FDP	Ulla Ihnen	8,165	5.5	▲4.1	14,735	9.9	▲5.7
PARTEI	Julian Klippert	4,168	2.8		2,966	2.0	
Pirates	Thomas Ganskow	1,516	1.0	▼1.1	968	0.7	▼1.6
Tierschutzpartei					1,342	0.9	▲0.1
DM					512	0.3	
BGE					489	0.3	
DiB					470	0.3	
FW					355	0.2	0.0
V-Partei³					306	0.2	
ÖDP					186	0.1	
NPD					186	0.1	▼0.4
MLPD	Kurt-Peter Kleffel	235	0.2		127	0.1	0.0
DKP	Sabine Huppert	232	0.2		139	0.1	
Informal votes		1,407			940		
Total valid votes		147,624			148,091		
Turnout		149,031	77.0	▲3.9			
SPD hold	Majority	7,031	4.8	▼4.1			

=== 2013 election ===
Federal election (2013): Stadt Hannover II
Notes:	Blue background denotes the winner of the electorate vote. Pink background denotes a candidate elected from their party list. Yellow background denotes an electorate win by a list member, or other incumbent. A ✓ or ✗ denotes status of any incumbent, win or lose respectively.						
Party	Candidate	Votes	%	±%	Party votes	%	±%
SPD	✓ Edelgard Bulmahn	59,686	42.8	▲3.2	48,292	34.7	▲4.9
CDU	Ursula von der Leyen	47,180	33.9	▲1.8	41,684	29.9	▲5.6
Greens	Sven-Christian Kindler	14,229	10.2	▼1.2	21,559	15.5	▼2.3
Left	Jörn Jan Leidecker	8,657	6.2	▼3.1	11,129	8.0	▼2.6
AfD	Jörn König	3,802	2.7		4,749	3.4	
Pirates	Christian Szymanek	2,937	2.1		3,113	2.2	▼0.9
FDP	Patrick Döring	2,050	1.5	▼4.8	5,983	4.3	▼7.3
Tierschutzpartei					1,171	0.8	0.0
NPD	Karin Hollack	803	0.6	▼0.6	736	0.5	▼0.5
FW					398	0.3	
PRO					155	0.1	
PBC					146	0.1	
MLPD					95	0.1	0.0
REP					80	0.1	
Informal votes		1,871			1,925		
Total valid votes		139,344			139,290		
Turnout		141,215	73.1	▼0.6			
SPD hold	Majority	12,506	8.9	▲1.4			

=== 2009 election ===
Federal election (2009): Stadt Hannover II
Notes:	Blue background denotes the winner of the electorate vote. Pink background denotes a candidate elected from their party list. Yellow background denotes an electorate win by a list member, or other incumbent. A ✓ or ✗ denotes status of any incumbent, win or lose respectively.						
Party	Candidate	Votes	%	±%	Party votes	%	±%
SPD	✓ Edelgard Bulmahn	55,068	39.6	▼14.7	41,482	29.8	▼15.3
CDU	Ursula von der Leyen	44,534	32.1	▲1.7	33,872	24.3	▼1.0
Greens	Maaret Westphely	15,797	11.4	▲4.6	24,705	17.7	▲3.9
Left	Heidrun Dittrich	12,886	9.3	▲5.0	14,786	10.6	▲5.2
FDP	Patrick Döring	8,657	6.2	▲3.1	16,098	11.6	▲3.6
Pirates					4,368	3.1	
NPD	Wilfried Aldag	1,573	1.1	0.0	1,411	1.0	0.0
Tierschutzpartei					1,106	0.8	▲0.3
RRP					887	0.6	
Independent	Gerd Weiland	417	0.3				
ÖDP					221	0.2	
MLPD					137	0.1	0.0
DVU					122	0.1	
Informal votes		1,655			1,392		
Total valid votes		138,932			139,195		
Turnout		140,587	73.8	▼4.7			
SPD hold	Majority	10,534	7.6	▼16.3			

=== 2005 election ===
Federal election (2005):Stadt Hannover II
Notes:	Blue background denotes the winner of the electorate vote. Pink background denotes a candidate elected from their party list. Yellow background denotes an electorate win by a list member, or other incumbent. A ✓ or ✗ denotes status of any incumbent, win or lose respectively.						
Party	Candidate	Votes	%	±%	Party votes	%	±%
SPD	✓ Edelgard Bulmahn	79,249	54.3	▼2.0	66,004	45.1	▼4.8
CDU	Friedbert Pflüger	44,250	30.3	▲1.7	37,099	25.4	▼0.8
Greens	Silke Stokar von Neuforn	9,943	6.8	▼0.6	20,271	13.9	0.0
Left	Diether Dehm	6,305	4.3	▲2.8	7,969	5.4	▲3.4
FDP	Patrick Döring	4,629	3.2	▼1.0	11,689	8.0	▲1.9
NPD	Klaus Schamberg	1,583	1.1		1,428	1.0	▲0.8
Tierschutzpartei					747	0.5	▲0.2
GRAUEN					539	0.4	▲0.2
PBC					293	0.2	0.0
MLPD					106	0.1	
BüSo					84	0.1	0.0
Pro German Center – Pro D-Mark Initiative					84	0.1	
Informal votes		2,006			1,652		
Total valid votes		145,959			146,313		
Turnout		147,965	78.5	▼1.8			
SPD hold	Majority	34,999	24				
