= Hannover Zoo =

Hannover Zoo may refer to:

- Zoo, Hanover, or Hannover-Zoo, a district of the city of Hanover, Germany
- Hanover Zoo, the zoo in Hanover, Germany
