= Hildesheim (electoral district) =

Federal electoral district of Germany

Coordinates: 52°05′N 9°55′E

48 Hildesheim
- Electoral district for the Bundestag
- Hildesheim in 2025
- State: Lower Saxony
- Population: 275,800 (2019)
- Electorate: 215,131 (2021)
- Major settlements: Hildesheim
- Area: 1,208.3 km^{2}

Current electoral district
- Created: 1949
- Party: SPD
- Member: Daniela Rump
- Elected: 2025

Hildesheim is an electoral constituency (German: Wahlkreis) represented in the Bundestag. It elects one member via first-past-the-post voting. Under the current constituency numbering system, it is designated as constituency 48. It is located in southern Lower Saxony, comprising the district of Hildesheim.

Hildesheim was created for the inaugural 1949 federal election. From 2017-2025, it has been represented by Bernd Westphal of the Social Democratic Party (SPD). Since 2025 it has been represented by Daniela Rump of the SPD.

== Geography ==
Hildesheim is located in southern Lower Saxony. As of the 2021 federal election, it comprises the district of Hildesheim.

== History ==
Hildesheim was created in 1949, then known as Hildesheim-Stadt und -Land. It acquired its current name in the 1965 election. In the inaugural Bundestag election, it was Lower Saxony constituency 26 in the numbering system. From 1953 through 1961, it was number 48. From 1965 through 1998, it was number 43. In the 2002 and 2005 elections, it was number 48. In the 2009 election, it was number 49. Since the 2013 election, it has been number 48.

Originally, the constituency comprised the independent city of Hildesheim and the district of Hildesheim-Marienburg. In the 1976 election, it compromised the district of Hildesheim without the municipality of Nordstemmen. Since the 1980 election, it has comprised the entirety of the district of Hildesheim.

Election	No.	Name	Borders
1949	26	Hildesheim-Stadt und -Land	Hildesheim city; Hildesheim-Marienburg district
1953	48	Hildesheim-Stadt und -Land	Hildesheim city; Hildesheim-Marienburg district
1957	48	Hildesheim-Stadt und -Land	Hildesheim city; Hildesheim-Marienburg district
1961	48	Hildesheim-Stadt und -Land	Hildesheim city; Hildesheim-Marienburg district
1965	43	Hildesheim	Hildesheim city; Hildesheim-Marienburg district
1969	43	Hildesheim	Hildesheim city; Hildesheim-Marienburg district
1972	43	Hildesheim	Hildesheim city; Hildesheim-Marienburg district
1976	43	Hildesheim	Hildesheim (excluding Nordstemmen municipality)
1980	43	Hildesheim	Hildesheim
1983	43	Hildesheim	Hildesheim
1987	43	Hildesheim	Hildesheim
1990	43	Hildesheim	Hildesheim
1994	43	Hildesheim	Hildesheim
1998	43	Hildesheim	Hildesheim
2002	48	Hildesheim	Hildesheim
2005	48	Hildesheim	Hildesheim
2009	49	Hildesheim	Hildesheim
2013	48	Hildesheim	Hildesheim
2017	48	Hildesheim	Hildesheim
2021	48	Hildesheim	Hildesheim
2025	48	Hildesheim	Hildesheim

== Members ==
The constituency was first held by Heinrich-Wilhelm Ruhnke of the Social Democratic Party (SPD), who served from 1949 to 1953. Adolf Cillien of the Christian Democratic Union (CDU) won it in 1953 and served a single term. He was succeeded by fellow CDU member Theodor Oberländer, who also served a single term. Friedrich Kühn of the CDU was elected in 1961 and re-elected in 1965. Joachim Raffert regained the constituency for the SPD in 1969. In 1972, he was succeeded by Hermann Rappe. He served until 1998, when fellow SPD member Bernhard Brinkmann was elected. He served four terms as representative. In 2013, Ute Bertram of the CDU was elected. In 2017, Bernd Westphal regained the constituency for the SPD. In 2025 Westphal did not run for reelection and Daniela Rump, of the SPD, was elected.

Election	Member	Party	%
1949	Heinrich-Wilhelm Ruhnke	SPD	31.1
1953	Adolf Cillien	CDU	45.7
1957	Theodor Oberländer	CDU	46.2
1961	Friedrich Kühn	CDU	41.0
1965	Friedrich Kühn	CDU	46.5
1969	Joachim Raffert	SPD	48.2
1972	Hermann Rappe	SPD	54.3
1976	Hermann Rappe	SPD	49.3
1980	Hermann Rappe	SPD	53.4
1983	Hermann Rappe	SPD	48.4
1987	Hermann Rappe	SPD	49.0
1990	Hermann Rappe	SPD	47.4
1994	Hermann Rappe	SPD	50.0
1998	Bernhard Brinkmann	SPD	54.3
2002	Bernhard Brinkmann	SPD	53.5
2005	Bernhard Brinkmann	SPD	51.0
2009	Bernhard Brinkmann	SPD	39.0
2013	Ute Bertram	CDU	42.3
2017	Bernd Westphal	SPD	37.2
2021	Bernd Westphal	SPD	38.7
2025	Daniela Rump	SPD	30.7

== Election results ==
=== 2025 election ===
Federal election (2025): Hildesheim
Notes:	Blue background denotes the winner of the electorate vote. Pink background denotes a candidate elected from their party list. Yellow background denotes an electorate win by a list member, or other incumbent. A ✓ or ✗ denotes status of any incumbent, win or lose respectively.						
Party	Candidate	Votes	%	±%	Party votes	%	±%
SPD	Daniela Rump	53,925	30.7	▼7.9	42,610	24.2	▼10.5
CDU	Justus Lüder	51,421	29.3	▲3.6	47,275	26.9	▲4.1
AfD	Thorsten Althaus	31,963	18.2	▲11.1	31,741	18.1	▲10.4
Greens	Ottmar von Holtz	16,511	9.4	▼4.9	20,303	11.6	▼5.1
Left	Maik Brückner	12,021	6.9	▲3.4	14,749	8.4	▲5.1
BSW					6,580	3.7	
FDP	Tim Heckeroth	4,369	2.5	▼4.7	6,535	3.7	▼5.9
Tierschutzpartei					2,245	1.3	0.0
FW	Henrik Bode	2,120	1.2	▲0.3	991	0.6	▼0.4
Independent	Marvin Bellgardt	1,630	0.9				
Volt	Sebastian Baacke	1,416	0.8		898	0.5	▲0.3
PARTEI					812	0.5	▼0.4
dieBasis				▼1.3	399	0.2	▼0.8
Pirates				▼0.9	257	0.1	▼0.4
Humanists					100	0.1	0.0
MLPD					33	0.0	0.0
Team Todenhöfer							▼0.3
ÖDP				▼0.2			▼0.1
Informal votes		1,305			920		
Total valid votes		175,376			175,761		
Turnout		176,681	83.7	▲8.5			
SPD hold	Majority	2,504	1.4				

=== 2021 election ===
Federal election (2021): Hildesheim
Notes:	Blue background denotes the winner of the electorate vote. Pink background denotes a candidate elected from their party list. Yellow background denotes an electorate win by a list member, or other incumbent. A ✓ or ✗ denotes status of any incumbent, win or lose respectively.						
Party	Candidate	Votes	%	±%	Party votes	%	±%
SPD	✓ Bernd Westphal	61,857	38.7	▲1.5	55,439	34.7	▲3.8
CDU	Ute Bertram	41,230	25.8	▼10.2	36,504	22.8	▼9.8
Greens	Ottmar von Holtz	22,973	14.4	▲6.8	26,565	16.6	▲7.8
FDP	Henrik Jacobs	11,507	7.2	▲1.6	15,397	9.6	▲1.4
AfD	Frank Rinck	11,387	7.1	▼1.5	12,161	7.6	▼1.7
Left	Rita Krüger	5,481	3.4	▼1.6	5,308	3.3	▼3.2
Tierschutzpartei					2,030	1.3	▲0.3
dieBasis	Michael Fritsch	2,153	1.3		1,628	1.0	
PARTEI					1,432	0.9	0.0
Pirates	Phil Höfer	1,506	0.9		793	0.5	▲0.1
FW	Heinrich Kalvelage	1,420	0.9		1,054	0.7	▲0.4
Team Todenhöfer					416	0.3	
Volt					309	0.2	
NPD					160	0.1	▼0.2
ÖDP	Henry Kucz	264	0.2		143	0.1	0.0
Independent	Otwin Herzig	201	0.1				
V-Partei3					125	0.1	▼0.1
du.					115	0.1	
Humanists					99	0.1	
DKP					37	0.0	0.0
MLPD					32	0.0	0.0
LKR					31	0.0	
Independent	Reinhard Wieczorek	30	0.0				
Informal votes		1,676			1,907		
Total valid votes		160,009			159,778		
Turnout		161,685	75.2	▼2.5			
SPD hold	Majority	20,627	12.9	▲11.7			

=== 2017 election ===
Federal election (2017): Hildesheim
Notes:	Blue background denotes the winner of the electorate vote. Pink background denotes a candidate elected from their party list. Yellow background denotes an electorate win by a list member, or other incumbent. A ✓ or ✗ denotes status of any incumbent, win or lose respectively.						
Party	Candidate	Votes	%	±%	Party votes	%	±%
SPD	Bernd Westphal	62,448	37.2	▼4.1	52,077	30.9	▼5.4
CDU	✗ Ute Bertram	60,457	36.0	▼6.3	54,871	32.6	▼6.1
AfD	Claus Grugelke	14,433	8.6		15,695	9.3	▲5.9
Greens	Ottmar von Holtz	12,691	7.6	▼0.9	14,806	8.8	▼0.2
FDP	Henrik Jacobs	9,330	5.6	▲4.0	13,876	8.2	▲4.8
Left	Orhan Kara	8,502	5.1	▲0.2	10,932	6.5	▲1.5
Tierschutzpartei					1,693	1.0	▲0.3
PARTEI					1,445	0.9	
Pirates					593	0.4	▼1.4
NPD					468	0.3	▼0.6
FW					453	0.3	0.0
BGE					320	0.2	
DM					305	0.2	
DiB					304	0.2	
V-Partei³					221	0.1	
ÖDP					150	0.1	
MLPD					56	0.0	0.0
DKP					32	0.0	
Informal votes		1,752			1,316		
Total valid votes		167,861			168,297		
Turnout		169,613	77.7	▲2.6			
SPD gain from CDU	Majority	1,991	1.2				

=== 2013 election ===
Federal election (2013): Hildesheim
Notes:	Blue background denotes the winner of the electorate vote. Pink background denotes a candidate elected from their party list. Yellow background denotes an electorate win by a list member, or other incumbent. A ✓ or ✗ denotes status of any incumbent, win or lose respectively.						
Party	Candidate	Votes	%	±%	Party votes	%	±%
CDU	Ute Bertram	68,653	42.3	▲5.8	63,041	38.7	▲6.8
SPD	Bernd Westphal	66,986	41.3	▲2.2	59,319	36.4	▲3.5
Greens	Brigitte Pothmer	13,771	8.5	▼0.5	14,587	8.9	▼1.5
Left	Lars Leopold	7,909	4.9	▼2.0	8,120	5.0	▼3.1
AfD					5,601	3.4	
NPD	Kerstin Breckel	2,537	1.6	0.0	1,482	0.9	▼0.6
FDP	Bernd Fell	2,489	1.5	▼4.7	5,589	3.4	▼7.9
Pirates					2,937	1.8	▼0.1
Tierschutzpartei					1,208	0.7	▼0.1
FW					455	0.3	
PRO					384	0.2	
PBC					151	0.1	
REP					92	0.1	
MLPD					31	0.0	0.0
Informal votes		2,451			1,799		
Total valid votes		162,345			162,997		
Turnout		164,796	75.1	▼0.1			
CDU gain from SPD	Majority	1,667	1.0				

=== 2009 election ===
Federal election (2009): Hildesheim
Notes:	Blue background denotes the winner of the electorate vote. Pink background denotes a candidate elected from their party list. Yellow background denotes an electorate win by a list member, or other incumbent. A ✓ or ✗ denotes status of any incumbent, win or lose respectively.						
Party	Candidate	Votes	%	±%	Party votes	%	±%
SPD	✓ Bernhard Brinkmann	64,555	39.0	▼11.9	54,487	32.9	▼14.1
CDU	Eckart von Klaeden	60,376	36.5	▼0.3	52,747	31.8	▼0.6
Greens	Brigitte Pothmer	14,856	9.0	▲4.2	17,360	10.5	▲3.4
Left	Michael Huffer	11,402	6.9	▲3.8	13,429	8.1	▲4.3
FDP	Bernd Fell	10,231	6.2	▲3.4	18,752	11.3	▲4.1
Pirates					3,191	1.9	
NPD	Ricarda Riefling	2,606	1.6	▲0.3	2,452	1.5	▲0.2
RRP	Wolfgang Weinsziehr	1,293	0.8		1,520	0.9	
Tierschutzpartei					1,405	0.8	▲0.3
ÖDP					171	0.1	
DVU					152	0.1	
MLPD					52	0.0	0.0
Informal votes		2,201			1,802		
Total valid votes		165,319			165,718		
Turnout		167,520	75.2	▼6.3			
SPD hold	Majority	4,179	2.5	▼11.6			

=== 2005 election ===
Federal election (2005):Hildesheim
Notes:	Blue background denotes the winner of the electorate vote. Pink background denotes a candidate elected from their party list. Yellow background denotes an electorate win by a list member, or other incumbent. A ✓ or ✗ denotes status of any incumbent, win or lose respectively.						
Party	Candidate	Votes	%	±%	Party votes	%	±%
SPD	✓ Bernhard Brinkmann	91,383	51.0	▼2.5	84,440	47.0	▼4.5
CDU	Eckart von Klaeden	66,053	36.8	▲1.9	58,261	32.4	▲0.6
Greens	Brigitte Pothmer	8,630	4.8	0.0	12,684	7.1	▲0.5
Left	Helmuth Schirmer	5,481	3.1	▲2.2	6,781	3.8	▲2.9
FDP	Joachim Konietzko	4,929	2.7	▼0.9	12,909	7.2	▲1.7
NPD	Carsten Steckel	2,289	1.3		2,315	1.3	▲1.1
Tierschutzpartei					1,041	0.6	▲0.2
GRAUEN					553	0.3	▲0.1
Statt Party	Gerhard Sundmacher	496	0.3				
PBC					383	0.2	0.0
Pro German Center – Pro D-Mark Initiative					156	0.1	
BüSo					74	0.0	0.0
MLPD					48	0.0	
Informal votes		2,978			2,594		
Total valid votes		179,261			179,645		
Turnout		182,239	81.5	▼1.6			
SPD hold	Majority	25,330	14.2				
