= Cillien =

Cillien is a surname. Notable people with the surname include:

- Adolf Cillien (1893–1960), German politician
- Ray Cillien (1939–1991), Luxembourgish boxer
