= Ute Bertram =

German banking specialist and politician

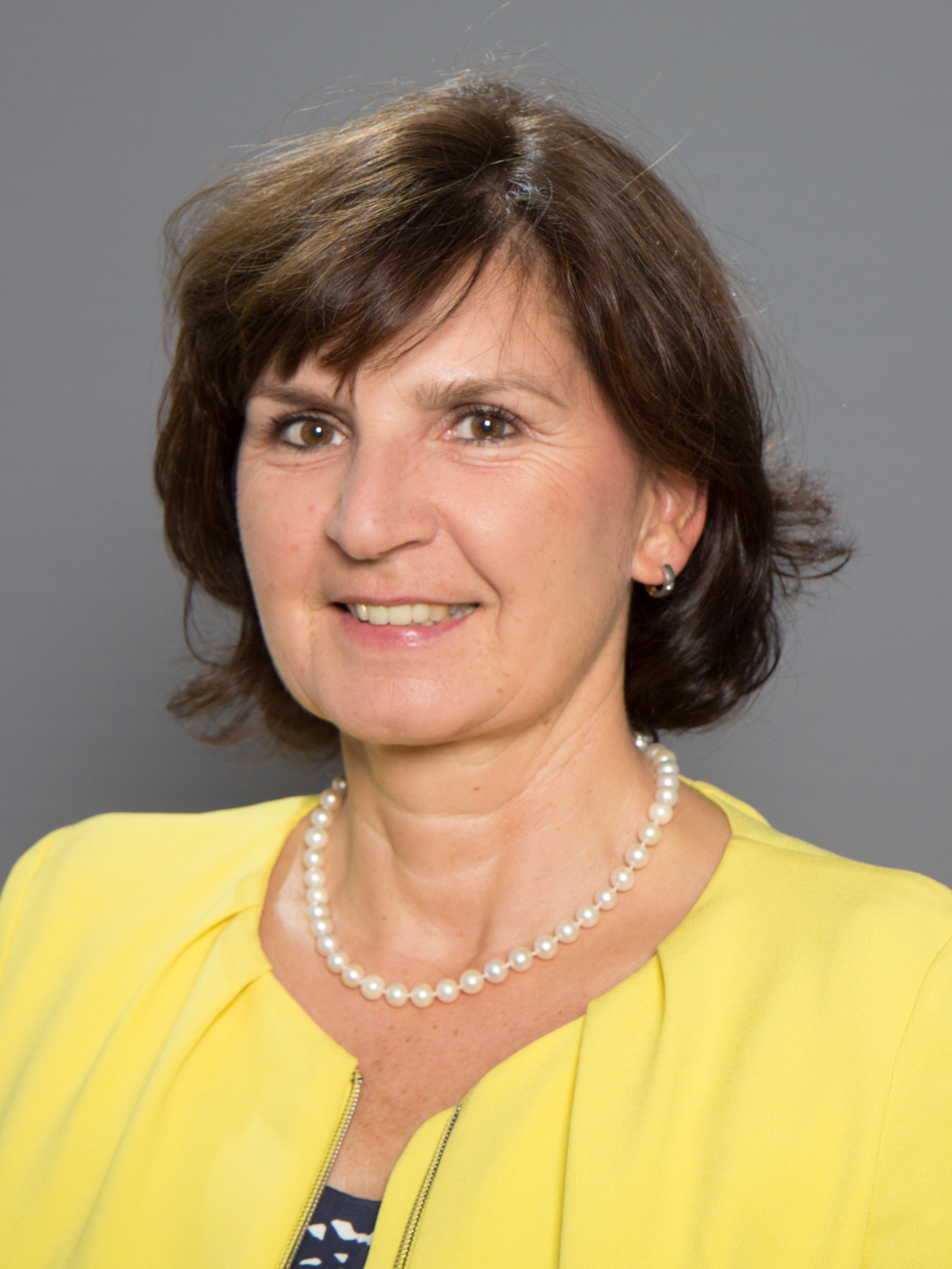
- Bertram in 2014

Member of the Bundestag; for Hildesheim
- In office 22 October 2013 – 24 October 2017
- Preceded by: Bernhard Brinkmann
- Succeeded by: Bernd Westphal

Personal details
- Born: 8 July 1961 (age 65) Hildesheim, West Germany
- Party: Christian Democratic Union
- Children: 3

Ute Bertram (born 8 July 1961) is a German banking specialist and politician (CDU). She was a member of the 18th German Bundestag.

== Education and early career ==
Ute Bertram attended the Scharnhorstgymnasium in Hildesheim and passed the Abitur exam in 1980. She completed a training as a bank clerk with a degree in 1982. At the Bankakademie Hannover she trained as a banking specialist. She worked at various locations for Deutsche Bank.

== Political career ==
Bertram joined the CDU in 2006. In 2011, she was elected to the district council in the district of Hildesheim. In the 2013 federal election, she received the direct mandate in the federal constituency of Hildesheim, which had been won since 1969 by SPD members, with 42.3 percent of the first votes.

In the 18th legislative session of the German Bundestag Bertram was a full member of the Committee on Culture and the Media and of the Committee on Health.

In the 2017 federal election, she lost her constituency Hildesheim to Bernd Westphal of the SPD and her list position was not sufficient for her to re-enter the German Bundestag.

== Personal life ==
Bertram is married and has three children.
