= Kerstin Tack =

German politician

- Tack in 2020

Member of the Bundestag; for Stadt Hannover I
- In office 27 October 2009 – 26 October 2021
- Preceded by: Gerd Andres
- Succeeded by: Adis Ahmetovic

Personal details
- Born: 11 November 1968 (age 57) Wittingen, West Germany
- Party: Social Democratic

Kerstin Tack (born 11 November 1968) is a German politician of the Social Democratic Party (SPD) who served as a member of the Bundestag from the state of Lower Saxony from 2009 until 2021. She served as a Member of the German Bundestag for Stadt Hannover I in Lower Saxony.

== Political career ==
Tack first became a member of the Bundestag in the 2009 German federal election. She was a member of the Committee on Labour and Social Affairs.

In the negotiations to form a coalition government under the leadership of Chancellor Angela Merkel following the 2017 federal elections, Tack was part of the working group on social affairs, led by Karl-Josef Laumann, Barbara Stamm and Andrea Nahles.

In August 2020, Tack announced that she would not stand in the 2021 federal elections but instead resign from active politics by the end of the parliamentary term.

== Other activities ==
- Special Olympics Germany, Vice-President (since 2014)
- German United Services Trade Union (ver.di), Member
