= Adis Ahmetovic =

German politician

Adis Ahmetovic MdB
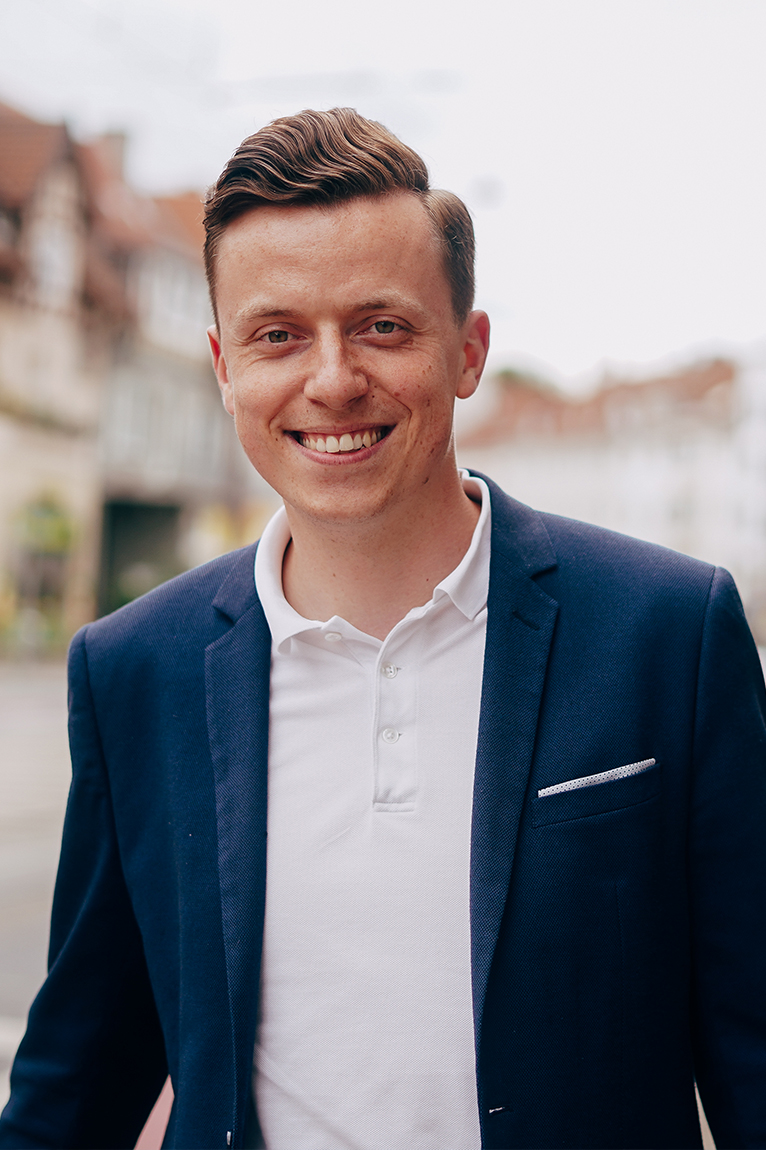
- Ahmetovic in 2021

Member of the Bundestag; for Stadt Hannover I
- Incumbent
- Assumed office 26 October 2021
- Preceded by: Kerstin Tack

Personal details
- Born: 27 July 1993 (age 33) Hannover, Germany
- Citizenship: Bosnian (1993–c. 2015); German (since c. 2015)
- Party: Social Democratic
- Education: Leibniz University Hannover
- Website: adis-ahmetovic.de

Adis Ahmetovic (Bosnian: Ahmetović, pronounced [axměːtoʋitɕ]; born 27 July 1993) is a German politician. He is a member of the Social Democratic Party of Germany and a Member of the Bundestag.

== Early life and education ==
Ahmetovic's parents are from Bosnia and Herzegovina. During the Bosnian War, they fled to Hannover in 1992, where Adis Ahmetovic was born in 1993. His father Fuad, who had previously worked as an administrative lawyer in Kotor Varoš, became a construction worker in Germany and later a warehouse clerk, his mother Edina worked as a cleaner. At the age of 22, Ahmetovic became a German citizen and gave up his Bosnian passport. In addition to German, he also speaks the Bosnian language.

In 2011, Ahmetovic graduated from Herschel School in Hannover and obtained his Abitur. At Leibniz University Hannover, he studied teaching politics, economics and German studies. During his studies he received a scholarship from the Friedrich Ebert Foundation. In 2019 he completed his studies obtaining the degree Master of Education.

== Early career ==
During his studies in 2013, Adis Ahmetovic worked as a research assistant for Kerstin Tack, a member of the Bundestag from 2009 until 2021. In 2015, Ahmetovic became head of Mustafa Erkan's office, a former SPD member and member of the Landtag of Lower Saxony, previously Ahmetovic worked there as a research assistant in the office. From 2016 to 2020 he worked as an office manager and later as a personal advisor to Minister President of Lower Saxony and Chairman of the Lower Saxon SPD (de), Stephan Weil. In 2020, he worked nine months as a consultant for government planning and fundamental issues in the Lower Saxon State Chancellery.

== Political career ==
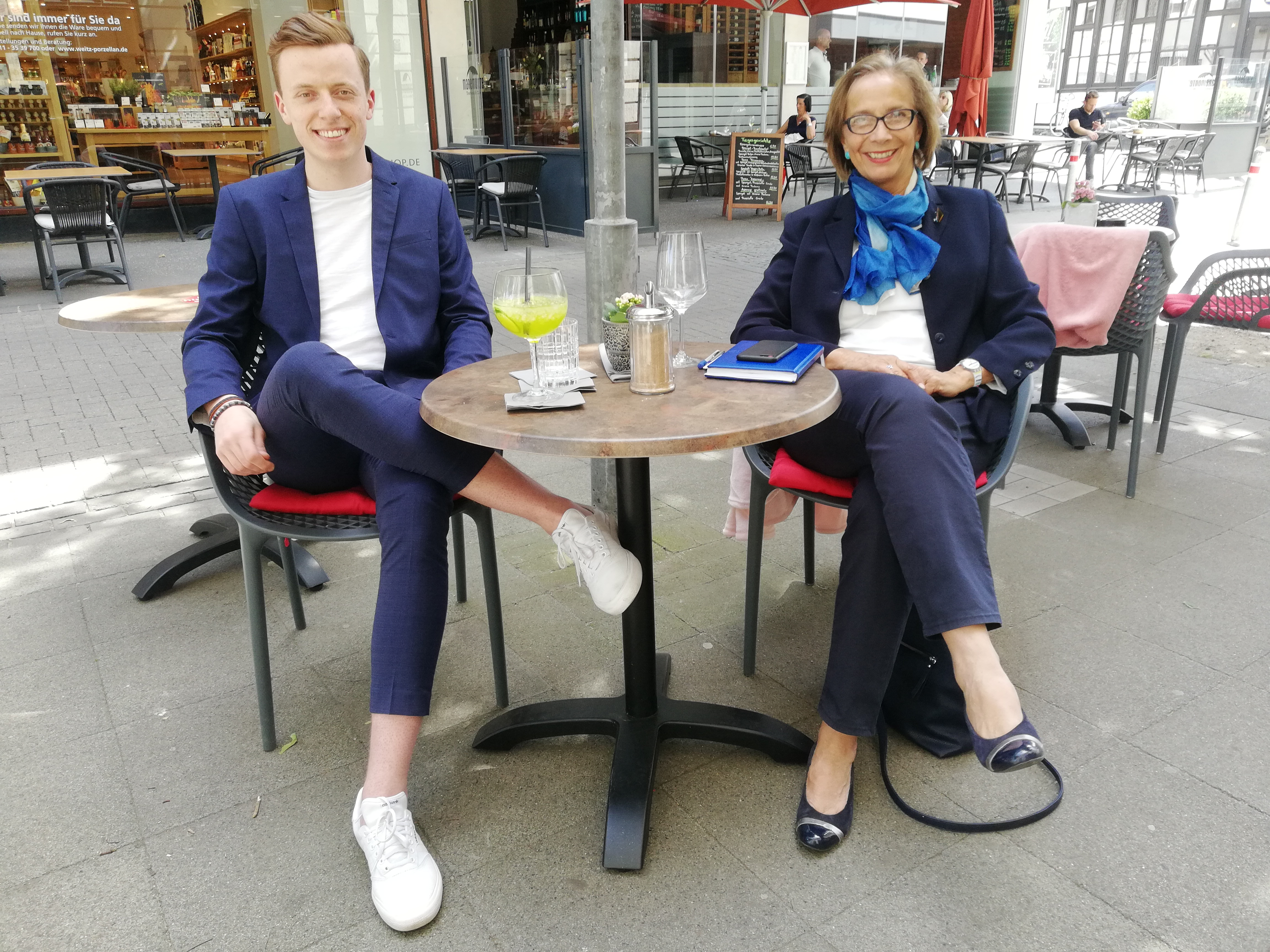
Adis Ahmetovic and Ulrike Strauch, leaders of the SPD Hannover in 2020

=== Early beginnings ===
Ahmetovic joined the Social Democratic Party of Germany in 2008. He was chairman of the Young Socialists in the SPD in the Hannover Region from 2014 to 2018 and has been one of the two leaders of the SPD Hannover since 2020.

In the 2016 Lower Saxony local elections, Ahmetovic was elected to the District Council of Bothfeld-Vahrenheide.

=== Member of the German Parliament (2021–present) ===
In the 2021 German federal election, Ahmetovic won the constituency of Stadt Hannover I. In this capacity, he was initially his parliamentary group's rapporteur on the Western Balkans from 2021 to 2025. Since the 2025 elections, he has been his parliamentary group's spokesperson on foreign affairs.

During the sale of a hospital in Lehrte, in the Hanover region, informations were allegedly leaked to one of the bidders as part of the bidding process. The Hanover Public Prosecutor's Office suspects Ahmetovic of being involved. In October 2026, the Public Prosecutor's Office searched his office. At that time, he did not know exactly what he was being accused of.

Within his parliamentary group, Ahmetovic belongs to the Parliamentary Left, a left-wing movement.

== Other activities ==
- Business Forum of the Social Democratic Party of Germany, Member of the Political Advisory Board (since 2022)

== Political positions ==
Ahmetovic aims to invest more in education, better care and cheaper housing. He also wants to strengthen Hannover as a work location. He has said that he is "very loyal" to the state of Bosnia and Herzegovina, and would like to be "Germany's strong voice for Bosnia and Herzegovina" in the Bundestag. For example, he advocates a rapid accession of Bosnia and Herzegovina to the European Union.

Following the 2025 elections, Ahmetovic endorsed Bärbel Bas as candidate to succeed Saskia Esken as co-chair of the SPD.

== Personal life ==
Ahmetovic is unmarried, does not practice any religion and lives in Hannover-Bothfeld.
