= Maren Kaminski =

German politician (born 1979)

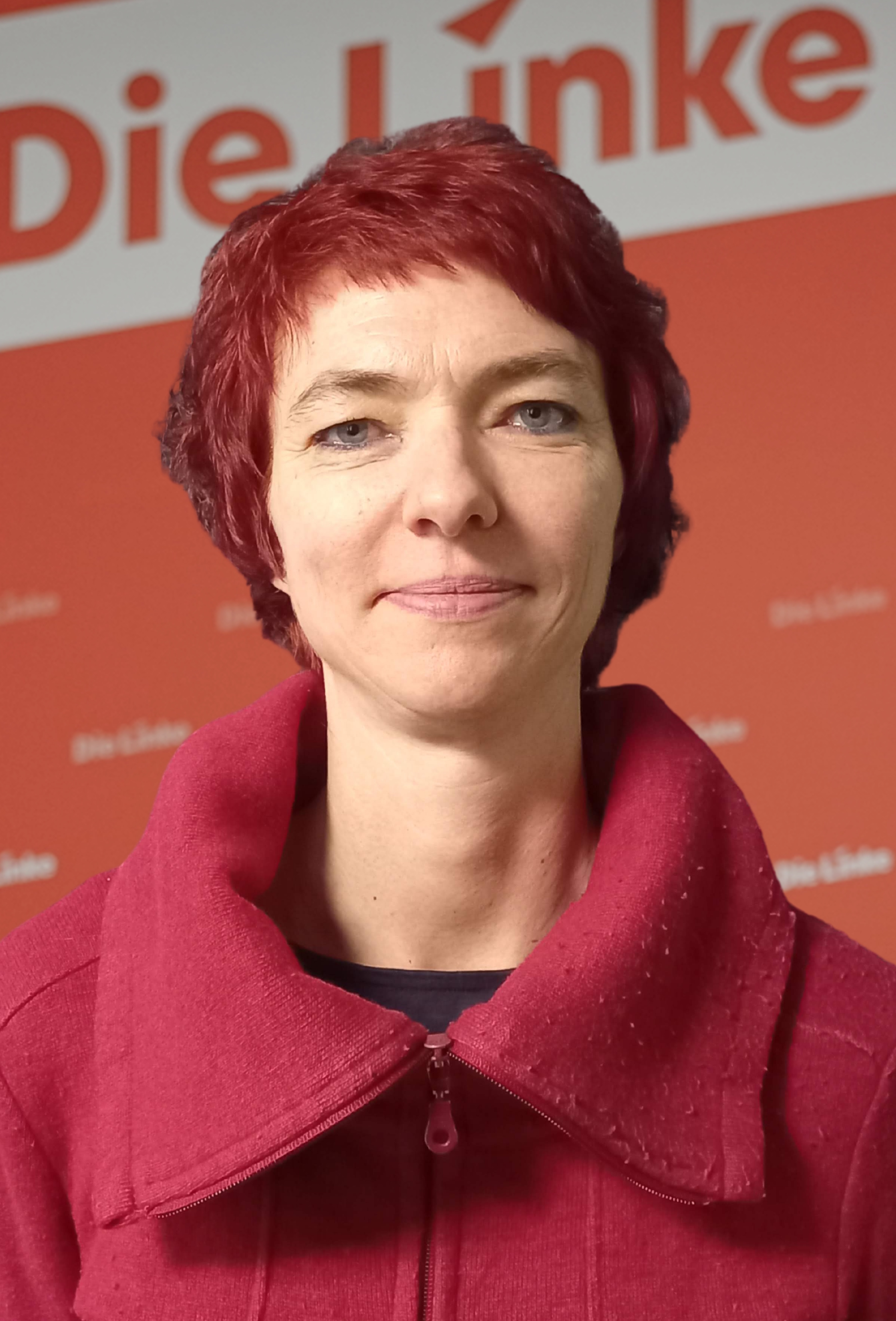
- Maren Kaminski, Member of the Bundestag (2025)

Member of the Bundestag from Lower Saxony
- Incumbent
- Assumed office 2025

Personal details
- Born: 15 February 1979 (age 47) Bramsche
- Party: Die Linke (since 2009)
- Other political affiliations: PDS (2002–2009); SDP (until 2002)
- Education: Leibniz University Hannover

Maren Kaminski (born 15 February 1979) is a German politician from Die Linke. She was elected to the Bundestag in the 2025 German federal election.

== Life ==
Kaminski studied social sciences at the Leibniz University Hannover. She then became union secretary of the Education and Science Union. She lives in the Linden-Limmer borough of Hanover and has a daughter.

== Political career ==
She was initially a member of the Social Democratic Party (SPD) and active in the Young Socialists (Jusos). As a result of the Hartz reforms of the Schröder government, she switched to the Party of Democratic Socialism (PDS). In 2013, she ran as a mayoral candidate for The Left Party in Hanover. From 2007 to 2013, she was monitored by the Lower Saxony Office for the Protection of the Constitution, which had placed an informant on her. She is the district chairwoman of The Left Party in Hanover.

=== State elections ===
In the 2013 Lower Saxony state election, she ran as a direct candidate in the Hanover-Buchholz constituency.

She ran as a direct candidate in the Langenhagen constituency in the 2022 Lower Saxony state election.

=== Federal elections ===
In the 2005 German federal election, she ran as a direct candidate in the constituency of Hannover-Land I for Die Linke.

In the 2009 German federal election, she ran as a direct candidate in the Osnabrück City constituency for Die Linke.

In the 2025 German federal election, Kaminski ran as a direct candidate in the constituency of Hannover II and on the list position of the Die Linke Lower Saxony. She won 10,888 (5.5%) of the first votes. She was elected to the Bundestag via the state list.
