= Edelgard Bulmahn =

German politician (born 1951)

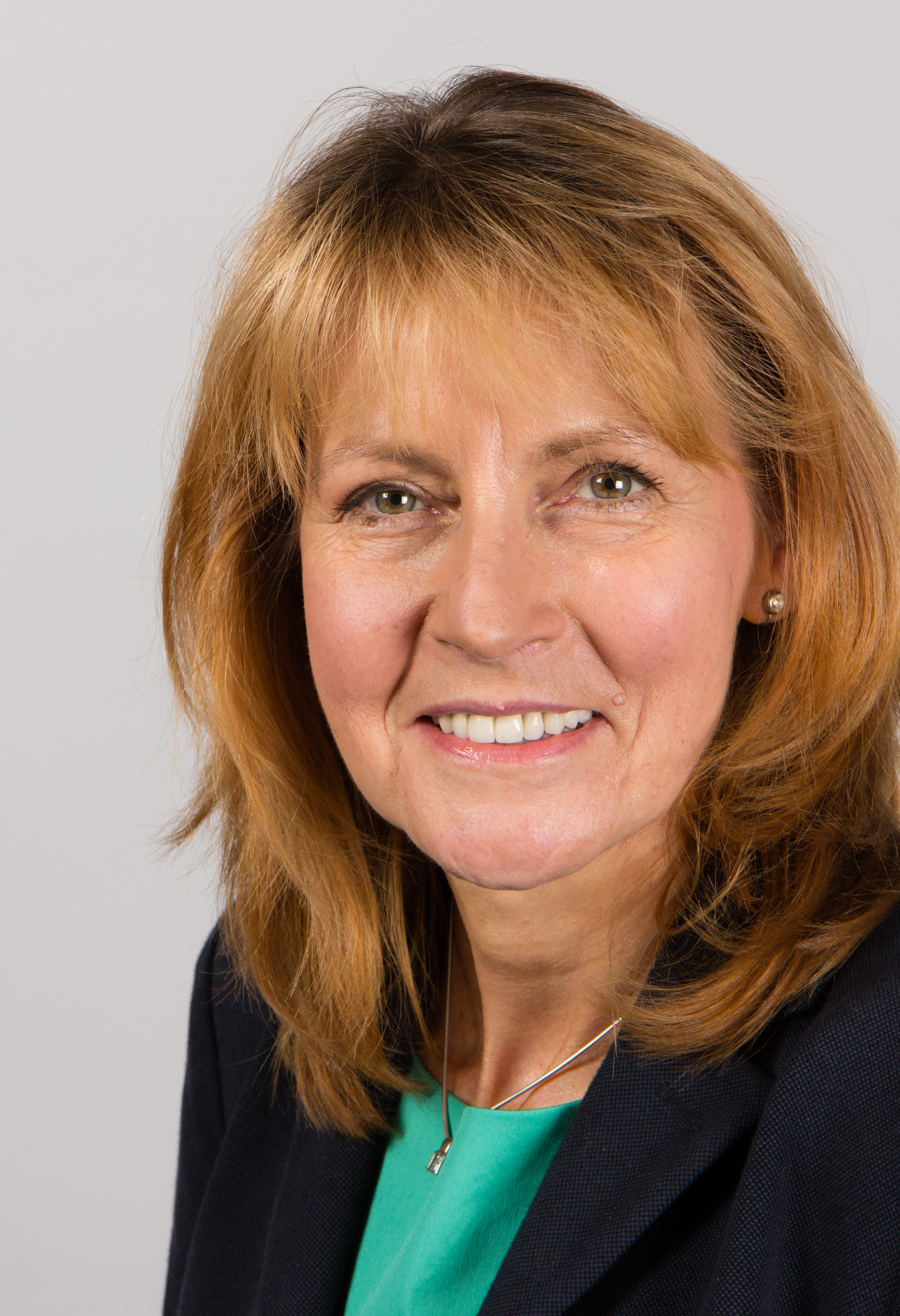
- Bulmahn in 2014

Vice President of the Bundestag (on proposal of the SPD-faction)
- In office 22 October 2013 – 24 October 2017
- President: Norbert Lammert
- Preceded by: Wolfgang Thierse
- Succeeded by: Thomas Oppermann

Chair of the Economics and Technology Committee
- In office 23 November 2005 – 22 October 2013
- Preceded by: Rainer Wend
- Succeeded by: Eduard Oswald

Minister of Education and Research
- In office 26 October 1998 – 22 November 2005
- Chancellor: Gerhard Schröder
- Preceded by: Jürgen Rüttgers
- Succeeded by: Annette Schavan

Member of the Bundestag; for Stadt Hannover II
- In office 18 February 1987 – 24 October 2017
- Preceded by: Helmut Rohde
- Succeeded by: Yasmin Fahimi

Personal details
- Born: 4 March 1951 (age 75) Petershagen, West Germany
- Party: Social Democratic
- Education: Leibniz University Hannover

Edelgard Bulmahn (born 4 March 1951) is a German politician from the Social Democratic Party of Germany (SPD). She served as Member of the German Bundestag between 1987 and 2017. She was Federal Minister of Education and Research from 1998 to 2005. From 2013 until 2017 she was elected as one of the Vice Presidents of the Bundestag.

== Early life and education ==
After gaining her Abitur (higher-education entrance qualification), Bulmahn spent one year living in the Bror Hayil kibbutz in southern Israel. She later studied political science and English language and literature at the Leibniz University Hannover. From 1981 to 1987 she worked as a school teacher in Hannover.

== Political career ==
Bulmahn joined the SPD in 1969 and was a member of the party executive committee from 1993 to 2011.

=== Member of the German Bundestag (1987–2017) ===
Bulmahn entered the German Bundestag following the 1987 federal elections, representing the 42nd electoral district of Hannover. From 1987 to 1990 she served as deputy chairwoman of the Bundestag's Study Commission on Technology Assessment and from 1990 to 1994 as deputy spokeswoman for the SPD parliamentary group on the Committee on Education, Research and Technology Assessment.

From 2005 to 2009, Bulmahn served as chairwoman of the Bundestag Committee for Economic Affairs and Technology. During that time, she was also the deputy chairwoman of the Parliamentary Friendship Group for Relations with Arabic-Speaking States in the Middle East, which is in charge of maintaining inter-parliamentary relations with Bahrain, Irak, Yemen, Jordan, Qatar, Kuwait, Lebanon, Oman, Saudi Arabia, Syria, United Arab Emirates, and the Palestinian territories.

From 2009 to 2013, Bulmahn was a member of the Committee on Foreign Affairs and spokeswoman of the SPD parliamentary group in the Sub-Committee on Civilian Crisis Prevention and Integrated Conflict Management. In this capacity, she served as her parliamentary group's rapporteur on Southeast Asia. In addition, from 2011 to 2013, she served as spokeswoman of the SPD parliamentary group in the Study Commission on Growth, Wellbeing and Quality of Life.

=== Federal Minister of Education and Research (1998–2005) ===
Bulmahn's tenure fell in a period of significant changes in Germany's education system. In 2002, amid a heated debate surrounding the German parliament's vote on allowing human embryo stem cells to be imported for medical research, she voiced her support for allowing the import of embryo stem cells under strict conditions. When Bulmahn first proposed in 2004 an initiative to foster an elite circle of universities with significant funds from the federal government, she drew heavy criticism; however, after lengthy negotiations with the state governments, a compromise was finally reached in June 2005.

=== Vice-President of the Bundestag (2013–2017) ===
On 22 October 2013, Bulmahn was elected as one of the Vice Presidents of the Bundestag. In addition, she was a member of the parliament's Council of Elders, which – among other duties – determines daily legislative agenda items and assigning committee chairpersons based on party representation. She also served as a member of the Committee on Foreign Affairs as well as of the Sub-Committee for Civilian Crisis Prevention.

In October 2016, Bulmahn announced that she would not stand in the 2017 federal elections but instead resign from active politics by the end of the parliamentary term.

== Political positions ==
In 2016, Bulmahn demanded that a financial bonus (€9,500) be paid to universities for every graduate student they attract.

== Other activities ==
=== Regulatory agencies ===
- Regulatory Authority for Telecommunications and Post, Member of the Advisory Board (1997-1998)

=== Non-governmental organizations ===
- Atlantik-Brücke, Deputy Chairwoman of the Board (–2019)
- German European Security Association (GESA), Member (2012–2013)
- Federal Chancellor Helmut Schmidt Foundation, Substitute Member of the Board of Trustees (since 2017)
- International Willy Brandt Prize, Chairwoman of the Jury
- Trilateral Commission, Deputy Chairwoman of the German Section

=== Scientific institutions ===
- Einstein Foundation, Member of the Advisory Board
- Humboldt University of Berlin, Chairwoman of the Board of Trustees
- Centre for European Policy Studies, Member of the Board
- Deutsche Telekom Stiftung, Member of the Board
- Hannover Medical School (MHH), Member of the Board
- FernUniversität Hagen, Member of the Parliamentary Advisory Board
- German Federation of Industrial Research Associations (AiF), Honorary Senator
- German Institute for Economic Research (DIW), Member of the Board of Trustees
- German Institute of Global and Area Studies (GIGA), Member of the Board of Trustees
- Helmholtz Association of German Research Centres, Member of the Senate
- Stiftung Lesen, Member of the Board of Trustees (since 2015)
- Stiftung Institut für Herzinfarktforschung (IHF), Member of the Board of Trustees (since 2015)
- VDMA Impuls-Stiftung, Member of the Board of Trustees
- Technische Universität Berlin, Member of the Board of Trustees (2005–2010)
- Volkswagen Foundation, Member of the Board of Trustees (2002–2009)
