= Egon Franke (politician) =

German politician (1913–1995)

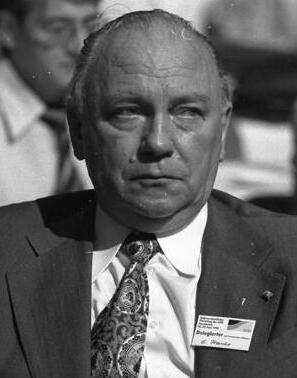
- Franke in 1976

Vice Chancellor of Germany
- In office 17 September 1982 – 1 October 1982
- Chancellor: Helmut Schmidt
- Preceded by: Hans-Dietrich Genscher
- Succeeded by: Hans-Dietrich Genscher

Minister of Intra-German Relations
- In office 22 October 1969 – 1 October 1982
- Chancellor: Willy Brandt; Helmut Schmidt
- Preceded by: Herbert Wehner
- Succeeded by: Rainer Barzel

Member of the Bundestag; from Lower Saxony
- In office 17 May 1951 – 18 February 1987
- Preceded by: Bruno Leddin
- Succeeded by: Gerd Andres
- Constituency: Stadt Hannover-Nord (1951–1965); State list (1957–1961); Stadt Hannover-Nord (1961–1965); Hannover I (1965–1980); Stadt Hannover I (1980–1987)

Personal details
- Born: 11 April 1913 Hanover, Germany
- Died: 26 April 1995 (aged 82) Hanover, Germany
- Party: Social Democratic

Egon Franke (11 April 1913 – 26 April 1995) was a German politician and a member of the Social Democratic Party (SPD). He served as Federal Minister for Intra-German Relations from 1969 to 1982 and, for the short period between the breakup of the SPD-FDP coalition on 17 September 1982 and the constructive vote of no confidence on 1 October of the same year, by which Helmut Kohl replaced Helmut Schmidt, as Vice Chancellor of Germany. With a tenure of 14 days he is, as yet, the vice chancellor with the shortest time in office.

In 1986 he was accused, along with confidant Edgar Hirt, of embezzlement and suppression of documents. They were accused of stealing 5.56 million marks, and on trial Franke said he knew nothing about the cash, in the end the cash was never found.

Political offices
Preceded by Hans-Dietrich Genscher	Vice Chancellor of the Federal Republic of Germany; 17 September–1 October 1982	Succeeded by Hans-Dietrich Genscher
