= Daniela Rump =

German politician (born 1996)

Daniela Rump MdB

Member of the Bundestag; for Hildesheim
- Incumbent
- Assumed office 25 March 2025
- Preceded by: Bernd Westphal

Personal details
- Born: 13 January 1996 (age 30) Hannover, Germany
- Party: Social Democratic (since 2016)
- Education: Leibniz University Hannover

Daniela Rump (born 13 January 1996) is a German politician who was elected as a member of the Bundestag in 2025. She has served as chairwoman of the Social Democratic Party in Hildesheim since 2023.
