= Bernhard Brinkmann =

German politician (1952–2022)

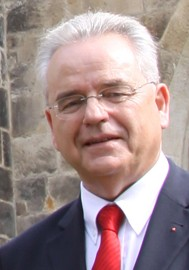
- Brinkmann in 2009

Member of the Bundestag; for Hildesheim
- In office 26 October 1998 – 22 October 2013
- Preceded by: Hermann Rappe
- Succeeded by: Ute Bertram

Personal details
- Born: 22 May 1952 Dinklar, West Germany
- Died: 7 December 2022 (aged 70)
- Party: Social Democratic

Bernhard Brinkmann (22 May 1952 – 7 December 2022) was a German politician and member of the SPD. He was a member of the Bundestag, the German federal parliament, from 1998, elected from the single member district of Hildesheim until 2013 and from the land list of Lower Saxony from then.

Brinkmann was born in Dinklar, Lower Saxony on 22 May 1952. He died on 7 December 2022, at the age of 70.
