= Schellerten =

- Municipality
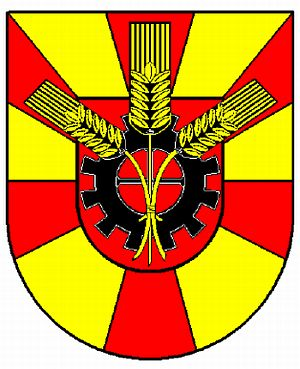
- Coat of arms

- Location of Schellerten within Hildesheim district
- Interactive map of Schellerten
- Location within Germany Location within Lower Saxony
- Coordinates: 52°10′N 10°5′E
- Country: Germany
- State: Lower Saxony
- District: Hildesheim

Government
  - Mayor (2021–26): Fabian von Berg (CDU)

Area
  - Total: 80.02 km^{2} (30.90 sq mi)
- Elevation: 99 m (325 ft)

Population (2025-12-31)
  - Total: 7,510
  - Density: 93.9/km^{2} (243/sq mi)
- Time zone: UTC+01:00 (CET)
  - Summer (DST): UTC+02:00 (CEST)
- Postal codes: 31174
- Dialling codes: 05123
- Vehicle registration: HI
- Website: www.schellerten.de

Schellerten is a village and a municipality in the district of Hildesheim, in Lower Saxony, Germany. It is situated approximately 10 km east of Hildesheim.

== Personalities ==
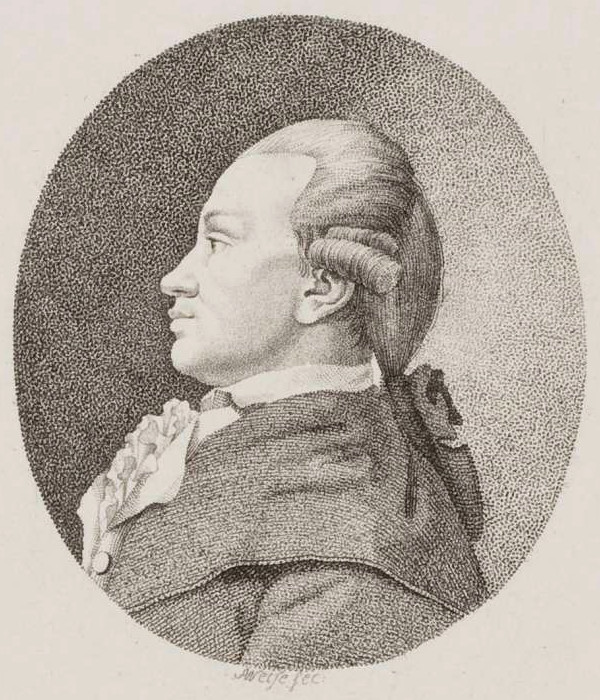
Christoph Daniel Ebeling in 1800

- Christoph Daniel Ebeling (1741-1817), pedagogue, music critic and librarian, born in the village of Garmissen
- Bernhard Brinkmann (1952-2022), politician (SPD), born in the village of Dinklar
