= Gerd Andres =

German politician and member of the SPD

- Andres in 2015

Member of the Bundestag; for Stadt Hannover I
- In office 18 February 1987 – 27 October 2009
- Preceded by: Egon Franke
- Succeeded by: Kerstin Tack

Personal details
- Born: 8 April 1951 (age 75) Wirges, West Germany
- Party: Social Democratic
- Children: 3

Gerd Andres (born 8 April 1951) is a German politician and member of the SPD. From 1987 to 2009 he was a member of the Bundestag.

== Literature ==
Herbst, Ludolf; Jahn, Bruno (2002). Vierhaus, Rudolf (ed.). Biographisches Handbuch der Mitglieder des Deutschen Bundestages. 1949–2002 [Biographical Handbook of the Members of the German Bundestag. 1949–2002] (in German). München: De Gruyter - De Gruyter Saur. p. 1715. ISBN 978-3-11-184511-1.
