= Harenberg =

- Ortsteil of Seelze
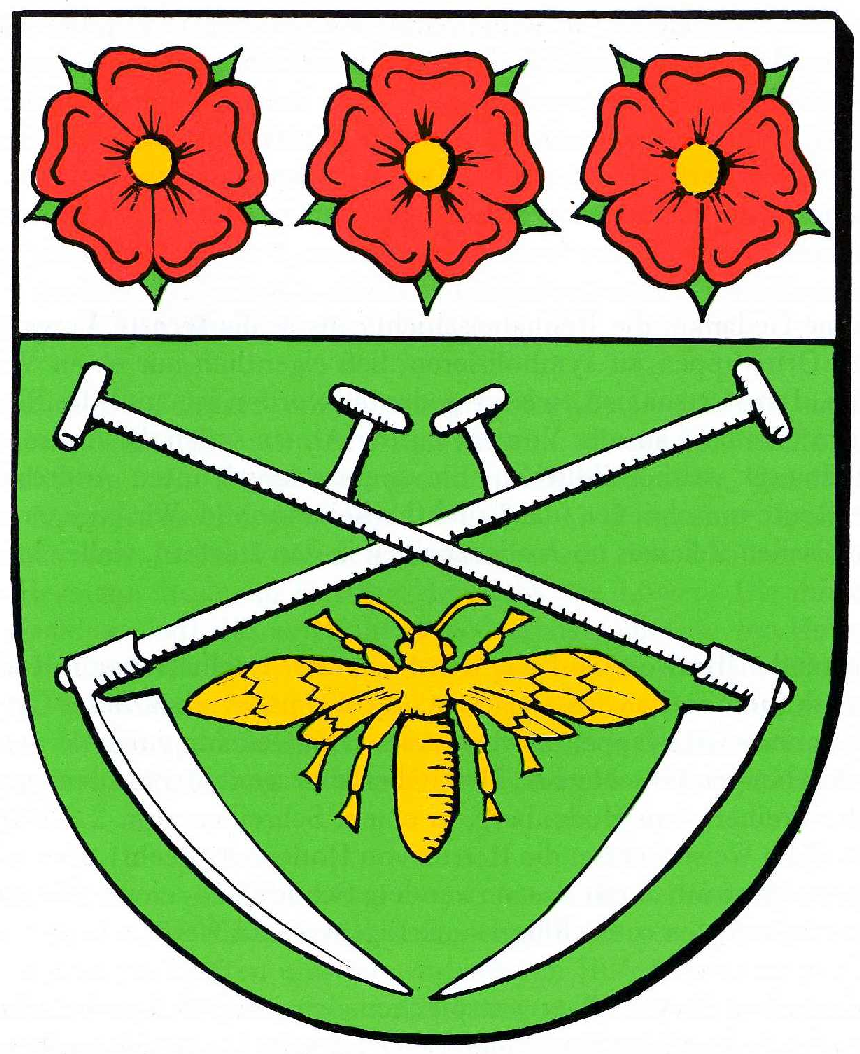
- Coat of arms
- Interactive map of Harenberg
- Location within Germany Location within Lower Saxony
- Coordinates: 52°22′48″N 9°37′17″E
- Country: Germany
- State: Lower Saxony
- District: Hanover
- Town: Seelze

Area
  - Total: 0.5 km^{2} (0.19 sq mi)
- Elevation: 72 m (236 ft)

Population (2019)
  - Total: 1,819
  - Density: 3,600/km^{2} (9,400/sq mi)
- Time zone: UTC+01:00 (CET)
  - Summer (DST): UTC+02:00 (CEST)
- Postal codes: 30926
- Dialling codes: 05137
- Vehicle registration: H

Harenberg is a district of the town Seelze, in the district of Hanover, in Lower Saxony, Germany.

== Geography ==
Harenberg is situated approximately 2 km west of the city of Hanover, close to the Bundesstrasse 441. The village lies on a flat landscape behind a hill, from which point there is a far-reaching view around, to Seelze and Hanover, as well as toward the Deister. Harenberg also includes three smaller settlements outside the village. These are the settlements Kollrothshöh (on the hill halfway between Hanover and Harenberg), Cemetery (on the street linking Harenberg and Seelze) and Mill (on the Linnenberg hill between Harenberg and fellow village Döteberg), which lie on the historical access roads to Harenberg.

== History ==
Harenberg can perhaps be traced back to the late Saxon settlement period of the 8th century. Its existence can more conclusively be validated from 1220 onward (documents from Hildesheim dated back to 1195 also may refer to it, but the obscurity of the spelling means this is not definitive). There is believed to have been an aristocratic family in Harenberg, who called themselves after their residence 'von Harenberg'. A Bernhard von Horenberge is mentioned in a Westphalian documents book from this time.

Harenberg developed through the settling of farms in the area through the ages, beginning to take shape around 1400. By 1600, Harenberg had 28 farm houses and had established itself as a village entity.

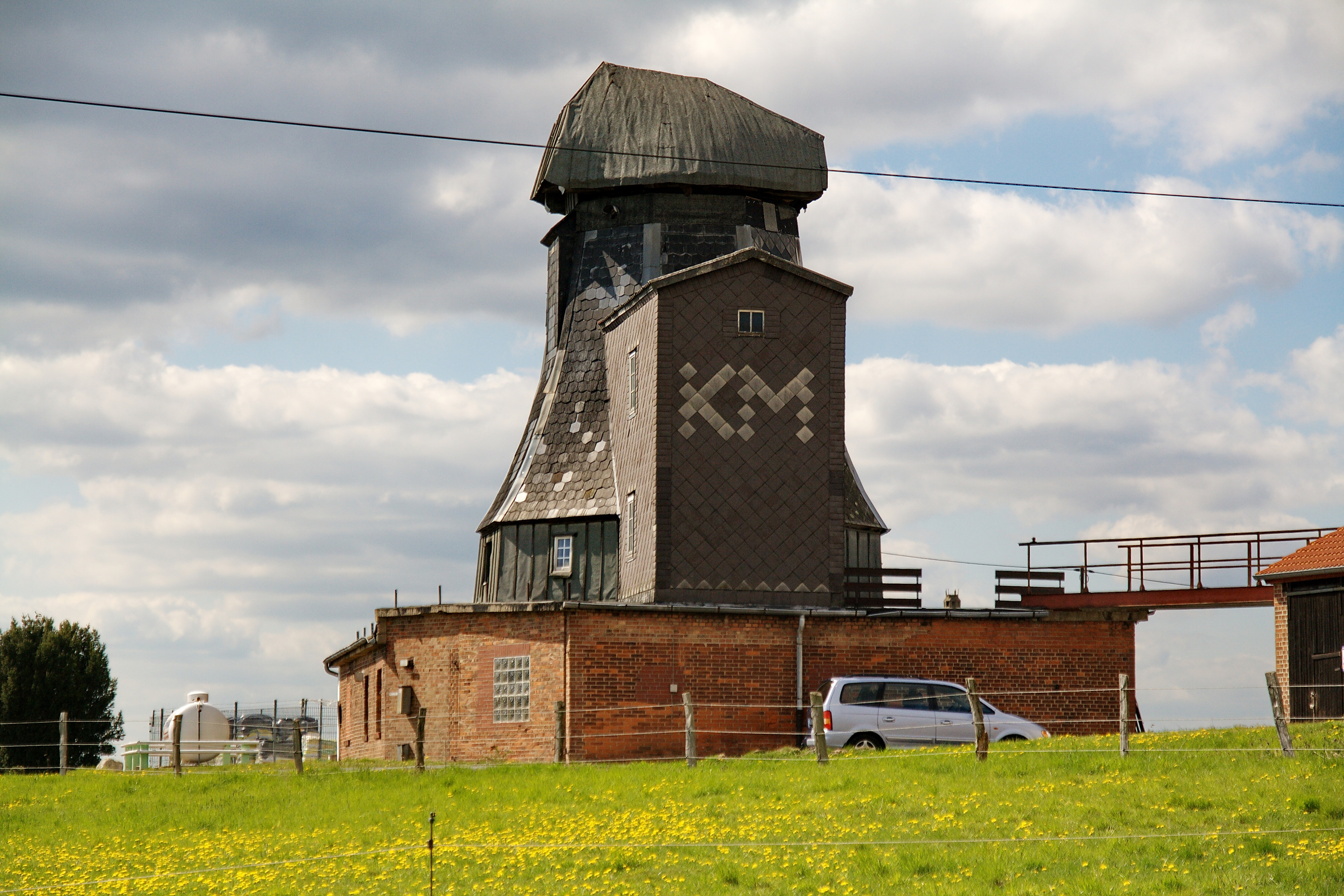
Harenberg windmill

With the agricultural reforms of the 1830s, and the dawning of the Industrial Age, the village structure began to alter. A tax list from 1873 details 43 houses with 317 inhabitants. Two-thirds of these worked as members of the family, farmhands and farmgirls and day labourers. The other inhabitants worked within trades such as tailoring, shoemaking, carpentry, smiths or weaving, though Harenberg did not yet have any factory or railway workers.

In the following half century, the number of inhabitants increased more and more as neighbouring Hanover's factories and railway links expanded and Harenberg's locality to the city gained it new inhabitants. The population also swelled later through the effects of World War II, as refugees relocated. Although, as in most villages, the role of agriculture has been continuously declining since the 1950s, several farming families still remain in the village.

== Places ==
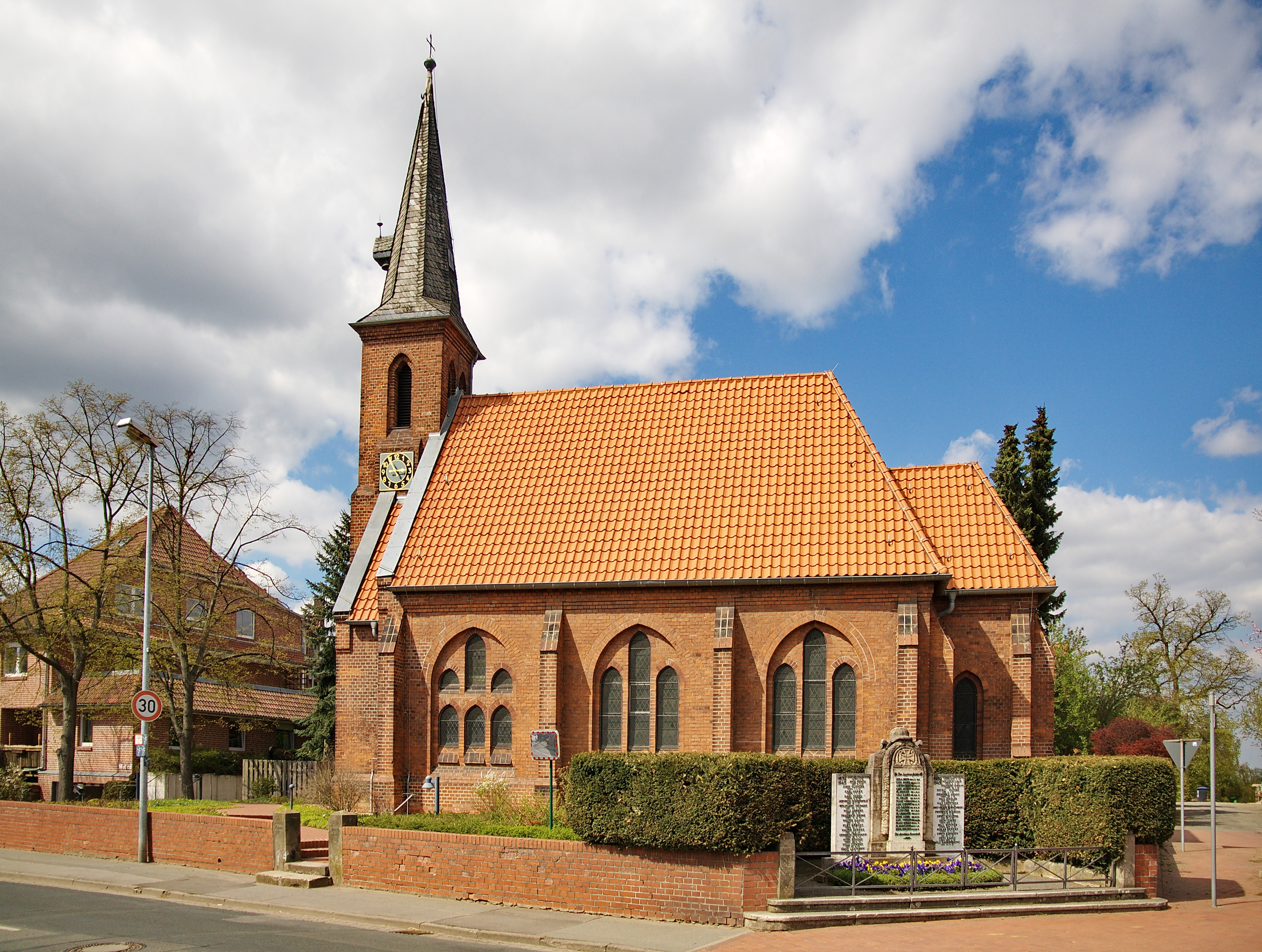
Barbara-Kirche

Harenberg has a neo-gothic-style church named Barbara-Kirche, that was developed from a small chapel built in 1882 by Conrad Wilhelm Hase. The chapel had also been used as a burial ground initially, before construction of the cemetery on Seelzer-Strasse in 1885.

The Harenberger primary school (Grundschule) serves children up to around age 10, and dates to 1689. It is also used as a polling station in local elections. Harenberg does not have a school serving older children, so they commute into Hanover for their secondary education.

The Sportplatz, tucked down in the south west of the village, is home to the local football club TuS Harenberg of the Hannover 1. Kreisklasse Staffel 3 league. The club, established in 1928, also has table tennis and volleyball sides.
