= Hermann Rappe =

German politician and trade unionist (1929–2022)

Member of the Bundestag; for Hildesheim
- In office 13 December 1972 – 26 October 1998
- Preceded by: Joachim Raffert
- Succeeded by: Bernhard Brinkmann

Personal details
- Born: 20 August 1929 Hann. Münden, Germany
- Died: 30 January 2022 (aged 92) Hildesheim, Germany
- Party: Social Democratic
- Children: 1

Hermann Rappe (20 September 1929 – 30 January 2022) was a German politician and trade unionist who served in the Bundestag from 1972 to 1998. He died on 30 January 2022, at the age of 92.
