= Helmut Rohde =

German politician (1925–2016)

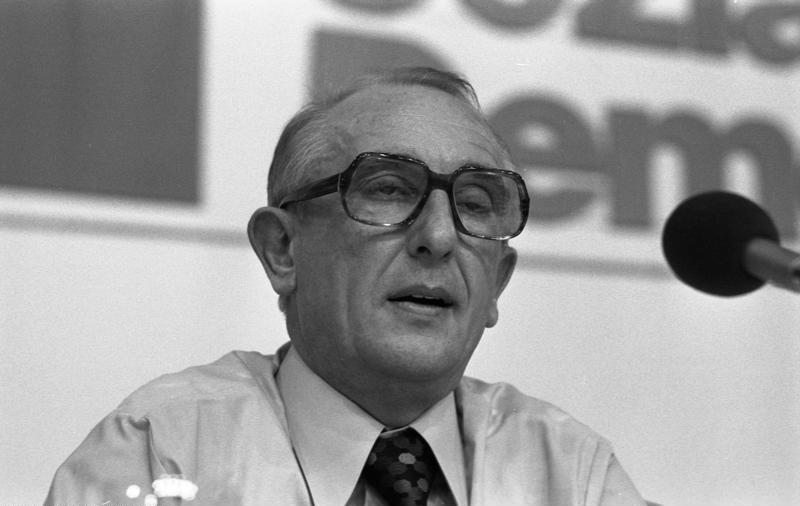
- Rohde in 1975

Minister of Education and Science
- In office 16 May 1974 – 16 February 1978
- Chancellor: Helmut Schmidt
- Preceded by: Klaus von Dohnanyi
- Succeeded by: Jürgen Schmude

Member of the Bundestag; from Lower Saxony
- In office 15 October 1957 – 18 February 1987
- Preceded by: Multi-member district
- Succeeded by: Edelgard Bulmahn
- Constituency: State list (1957–1965); Hannover II (1965–1980); Stadt Hannover II (1980–1987)

Personal details
- Born: 9 November 1925 Hanover, Germany
- Died: 16 April 2016 (aged 90) Sankt Augustin, Germany
- Party: Social Democratic
- Education: University of Göttingen
- Awards: Order of Merit of the Federal Republic of Germany (1978)

Helmut Rohde (9 November 1925 – 16 April 2016) was a German politician who served as federal minister of education and science from 1974 to 1978.

== Early life and education ==
Rohde was born in Hanover on 9 November 1925. His father, August, was a welder and a social democrat member of the independent trade union. Helmut Rohde fought in the German army in World War II and was a POW until 1945 when he was freed.

He studied journalism following the war and graduated in 1947. In 1950, he began to study politics and business in a higher education institution in Wilhelmshaven, which later became part of the University of Göttingen.

== Career ==
In 1945, Rohde became a member of the Social Democratic Party (SPD). After graduation he began to work as an editor at the German Press Agency's Hannover branch. His pseudonym in his writings was Achilles, the name of his grandfather. He served in the party's local organizations in Hannover in the 1950s and later served in its "working group for workers' questions". In 1957, he was elected to the Bundestag with the SPD from Hannover. From 1964 to 1965 he was also a member of the European Parliament.

He was appointed federal minister of education and science on 16 May 1974, replacing Klaus von Dohnanyi in the post. He served in the cabinet led by Prime Minister Helmut Schmidt. In 1975, Rohde became a member of the SPD's executive committee. Rohde's cabinet post ended on 16 February 1978 and another SPD politician, Jürgen Schmude, replaced him in the post. After leaving office he concentrated on his work in the SPD's working group for workers' questions.

In 1985, Rohde began to work as a lecturer at Leibniz University Hannover and the University of Bochum. In 1994, he was named as an honorary professor of the University of Bremen.

== Later years ==
Rohde lived in a nursing home near Bonn. He died on 16 April 2016, aged 90.
