= Bernd Westphal =

German politician

- Westphal in 2022

Member of the Bundestag; from Lower Saxony
- In office 22 October 2013 – 25 March 2025
- Preceded by: Multi-member district
- Succeeded by: Daniela Rump
- Constituency: State list (2013–2017); Hildesheim (2017–2025)

Personal details
- Born: Bernd Helmut Westphal; 30 September 1960 (age 66) Hildesheim, West Germany
- Party: Social Democratic
- Children: 3

Bernd Westphal (born 30 September 1960) is a German trade unionist and politician of the Social Democratic Party (SPD) who served as a member of the Bundestag from the state of Lower Saxony from 2013 to 2025.

== Political career ==
Westphal first became a member of the Bundestag in the 2013 German federal election. He was a member of the Committee for Economic Affairs and Energy and the Parliamentary Advisory Board on Sustainable Development. He has been serving as his parliamentary group's spokesperson on economic affairs and energy since 2015.

In the negotiations to form a coalition government under the leadership of Chancellor Angela Merkel following the 2017 federal elections, Westphal was part of the working group on energy, climate protection and the environment, led by Armin Laschet, Georg Nüßlein and Barbara Hendricks.

In the negotiations to form a so-called traffic light coalition of the SPD, the Green Party and the Free Democratic Party (FDP) following the 2021 federal elections, Westphal was part of his party's delegation in the working group on economic affairs, co-chaired by Carsten Schneider, Cem Özdemir and Michael Theurer.

In July 2024, Westphal announced that he would not stand in the 2025 federal elections but instead resign from active politics by the end of the parliamentary term.

== Other activities ==
=== Corporate boards ===
- Exxon Mobil Central Europe Holding GmbH, Member of the Supervisory Board (-2013)
- CeramTec, Member of the Supervisory Board (-2013)

=== Non-profit organizations ===
- Nuclear Waste Disposal Fund (KENFO), Member of the Board of Trustees (since 2018)
- Business Forum of the Social Democratic Party of Germany, Chairman of the Political Advisory Board (since 2018)
- German Industry Initiative for Energy Efficiency (DENEFF), Member of the Parliamentary Advisory Board
- IG BCE, Member
