= Zoo, Hanover =

Hannover-Zoo
- Stadtteil of Hannover
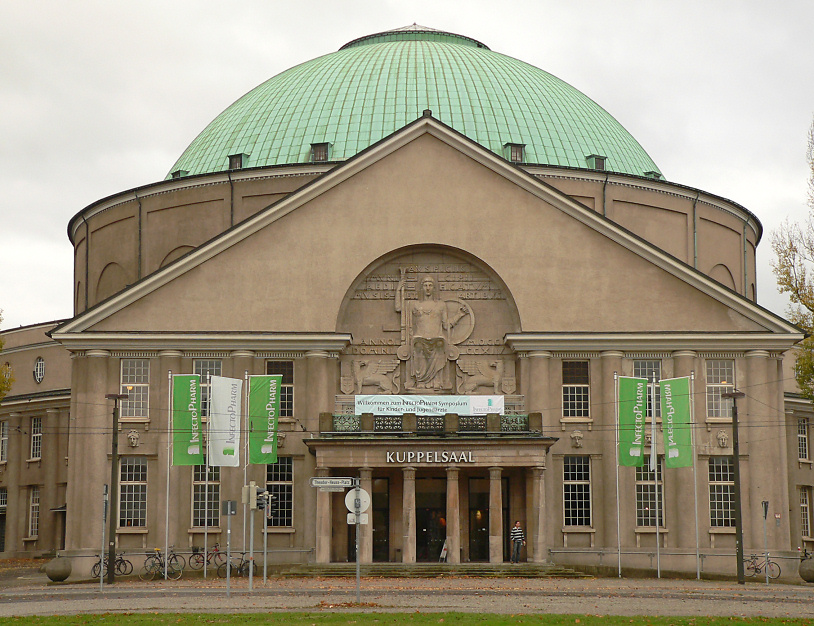
- Dome hall of the Stadthalle Hannover.

- Location of Hannover-Zoo within Hannover
- Interactive map of Hannover-Zoo
- Location within Germany Location within Lower Saxony
- Coordinates: 52°22′37″N 9°45′38″E
- Country: Germany
- State: Lower Saxony
- City: Hannover
- Borough: Hannover-Mitte

Population (2020)
  - Total: 4,952
- Time zone: UTC+01:00 (CET)
  - Summer (DST): UTC+02:00 (CEST)
- Vehicle registration: H

Hannover-Zoo (German pronunciation: [tsoː]; also called Zooviertel, rarely called Hindenburgviertel) is a quarter of the city of Hanover. Located within the quarter is the eponymous Hanover Zoo, also known as the Hanover Zoological Gardens. Part of the borough Hanover-Mitte, it has 4,952 inhabitants (2020).

The quarter is home to the Hanover Congress Center, whose complex contains the historic Stadthalle Hannover, as well as the Stadtpark Hannover, the city park of Hanover built on the grounds of the first Bundesgartenschau of 1951. The entire northern part of the Eilenriede belongs to the district. As such, the Lister Tower is also located in the Zoo district and not in the List district. The Hochschule für Musik, Theater und Medien Hannover is headquartered at the Neues Haus plaza in the quarter.

There are two high schools in the district, the Sophienschule and the Kaiser Wilhelm and Ratsgymnasium. On Gellertstraße street is the Neo-Romanesque church of St. Elisabeth. The former Jewish Hospital Hannover was also located in the district.

The later Reich President Paul von Hindenburg lived in the Zoo district from 1919 to 1925, from which the name Hindenburgviertel was derived. The city of Hanover had appointed Hindenburg as honorary citizen and gave him a villa. The Hindenburgvilla is now the seat of the Fritz Behrens Foundation.

The zoo district is considered a desirable residential area containing upscale historic buildings with significantly above-average rents and real estate prices.
