= Eckart von Klaeden =

German politician

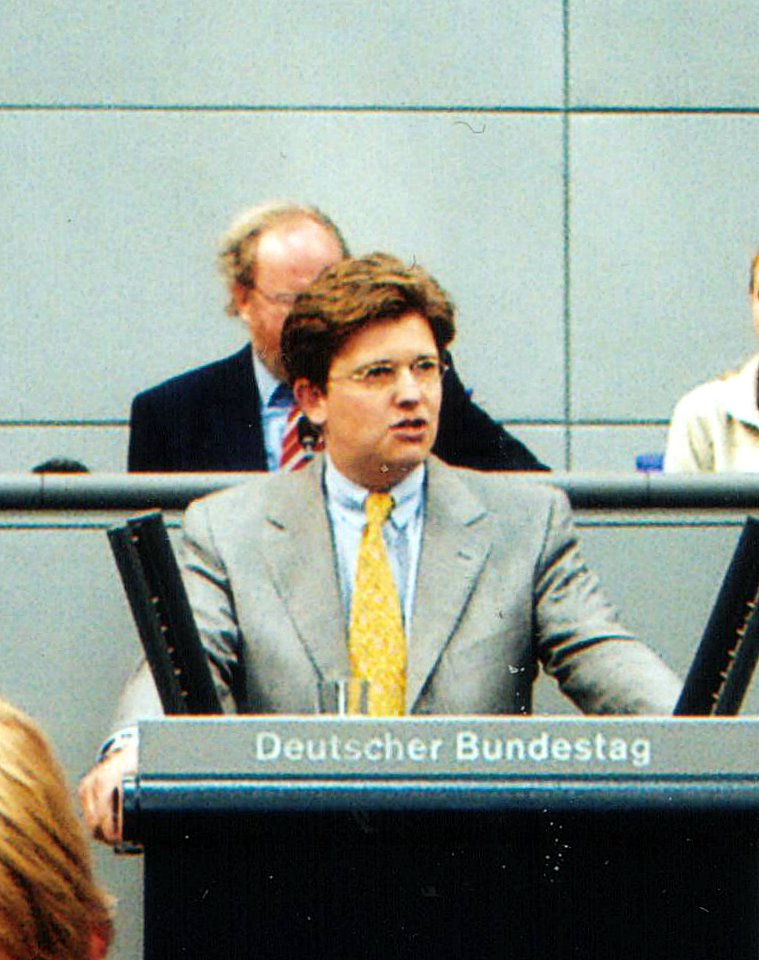

Minister of State at the German Chancellery
- In office 2009–2013
- Chancellor: Angela Merkel

Member of the Bundestag
- In office 1994–2013

Treasurer of the CDU
- In office 2006–2013

Personal details
- Born: 18 November 1965 (age 60) Hanover, West Germany
- Party: CDU
- Children: 3
- Education: University of Würzburg; University of Göttingen
- Occupation: Politician, lobbyist

Eckart Peter Hans von Klaeden (born 18 November 1965 in Hanover) is a German politician of the Christian Democratic Union (CDU) who served as Minister of State at the German Chancellery from 2009 to 2013.

== Early life and education ==
Eckart von Klaeden took his Abitur at the Emperor William Gymnasium in Hanover in 1985, served his military service from 1985 to 1987 and became a Korvettenkapitän (corvette captain) of the Reserves. He went on to study law at the universities of Würzburg and Göttingen, taking his first state exam in 1993 and his second in 1996.

== Career ==
Von Klaeden became a member of the Junge Union in 1983. Between 1992 and 1996, he served on the board of the CDU in Lower Saxony, under the leadership of successive chairmen Josef Stock (1992–94) and Christian Wulff (1994-96).

Von Klaeden served as member of the German parliament, the Bundestag, between 1994 and 2013. He was a member of the Committee on Legal Affairs (1994-1998) and of the Committee on the Scrutiny of Elections, Immunity and the Rules of Procedure (2002-2005). Between 2000 and 2005, he also served as First Secretary of the parliamentary group, in this position assisting the parliamentary group's successive chairmen Friedrich Merz (2000-2002) and Angela Merkel (2002-2005). From 2005, he was his parliamentary group's spokesman for foreign policy. In addition to his committee assignments, von Klaeden served as chairman of the German-Hungarian Parliamentary Friendship Group from 2002 until 2005.

Starting in 2004, von Klaeden was a member of the national board of the CDU under the leadership of chairwoman Angela Merkel. In this capacity, he was the party's treasurer from 2006 until 2013.

In 2007, 2008 and 2009, von Klaeden participated at the Bilderberg Conference.

=== Mercedes Benz ===
On 27 May 2013, von Klaeden informed the public that he would not run again for a seat in the Deutscher Bundestag in the 2013 German federal election and that he would start a job at the Daimler AG, Stuttgart as Manager, "Global External Affairs und Public Policy", chief lobbyist, at the end of 2013. His abrupt switch to the company prompted an investigation by Berlin prosecutors and new rules on "cooling off" periods.

At a November 2023 meeting of The Heritage Foundation, von Klaeden "implored Michael Anton to ask Trump to please talk to America's European allies as he formulated his foreign policy".

== Other activities ==
- Agora Verkehrswende, Member of the Council
- Center for European Policy Analysis (CEPA), Member of the International Leadership Council (since 2022)
- Aspen Institute Deutschland, Chairman of the Board of Trustees
- European Council on Foreign Relations (ECFR), Member
- German Committee on Eastern European Economic Relations, Member of the Presidium
- German Council on Foreign Relations (DGAP), Member of the Steering Committee
- Konrad Adenauer Foundation, Member
- Middle East Peace Forum (NAFFO), Member of the Board of Trustees
- Federal Agency for Civic Education (BPB), Deputy Chairman of the Board of Trustees (1998-2002)

== Personal life ==
He is a member of Atlantik-Brücke, Amnesty International and Society for Threatened Peoples (GfbV).

Von Klaeden is Protestant and a member of the presidium of the Deutscher Evangelischer Kirchentag, a Protestant organisation. He is married and has three daughters.
