= Swantje Michaelsen =

German politician (born 1979)

Swantje Henrike Michaelsen
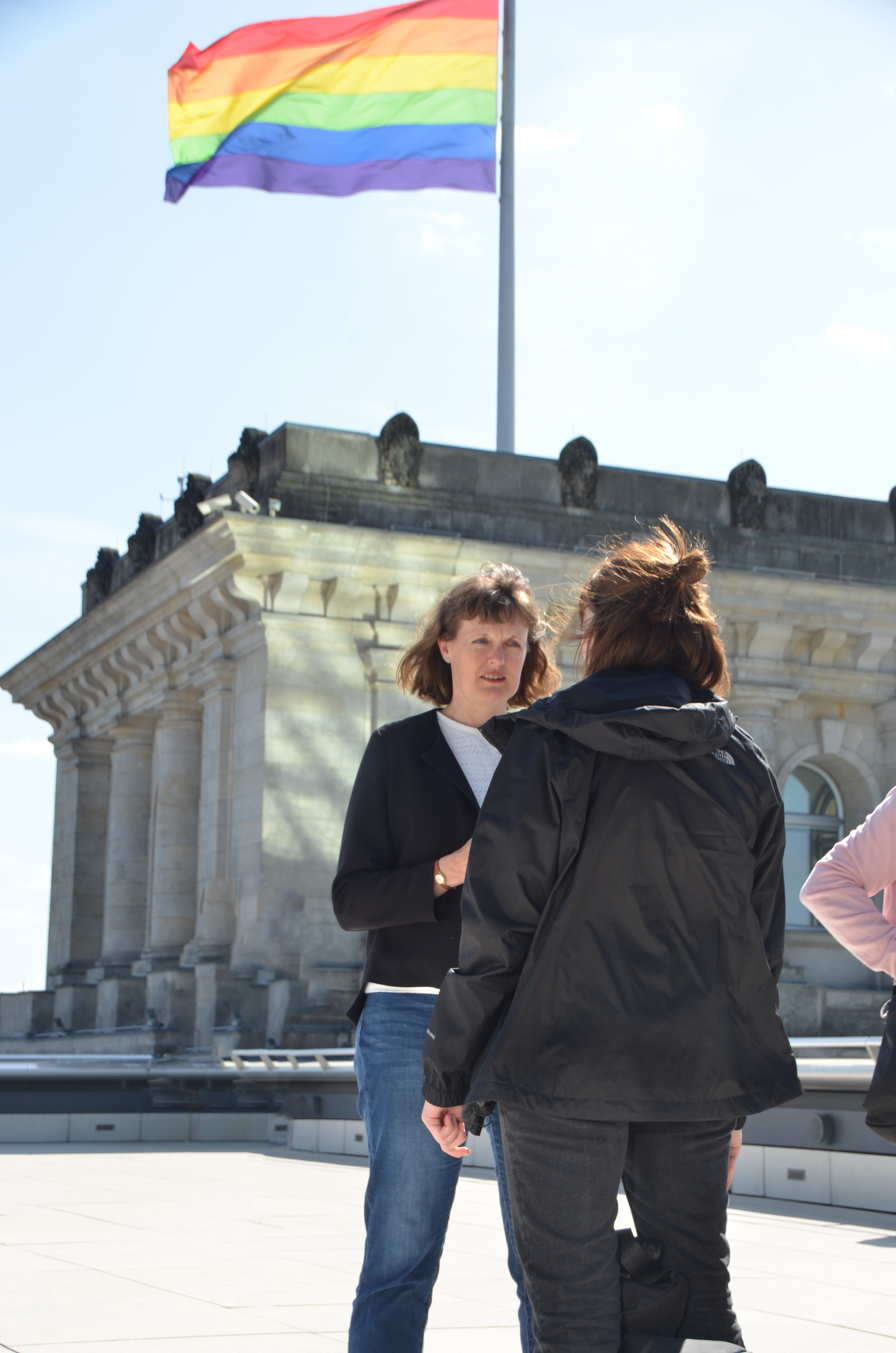
- Michaelsen in 2023

Member of the Bundestag
- Incumbent
- Assumed office 26 October 2021
- Constituency: Lower Saxony

Personal details
- Born: 4 October 1979 (age 47) Mainz, West Germany
- Party: Alliance 90/The Greens
- Education: University of Cologne

Swantje Henrike Michaelsen (born 4 October 1979) is a German politician of the Alliance 90/The Greens party who has been serving as a member of the Bundestag since the 2021 German federal election.

== Political career ==
In the 2017 German federal election, Michaelsen ran for election in the constituency of Stadt Hannover I. In 2021, she was elected, in 2025 reelected.

In parliament, Michaelsen serves on the Committee on Transport and the Committee on Petitions. She is her parliamentary group’s rapporteur on transportation.

== Other activities ==
- üstra, Member of the Supervisory Board (since 2019)
