= Jörn König =

German politician

Member of the Bundestag
- Incumbent
- Assumed office 2017

Personal details
- Born: 22 October 1967 (age 58) Berlin, East Germany (now Germany)
- Party: AfD

Jörn König (born 22 October 1967) is a German politician. Born in Berlin, he represents Alternative for Germany (AfD). Jörn König has served as a member of the Bundestag from the state of Lower Saxony since 2017.

== Life ==
He became member of the Bundestag after the 2017 German federal election. He is a member of the sports committee.

König is a deputy leader of AfD's parliamentary group.
