= Adolf Cillien =

German politician (1893–1960)

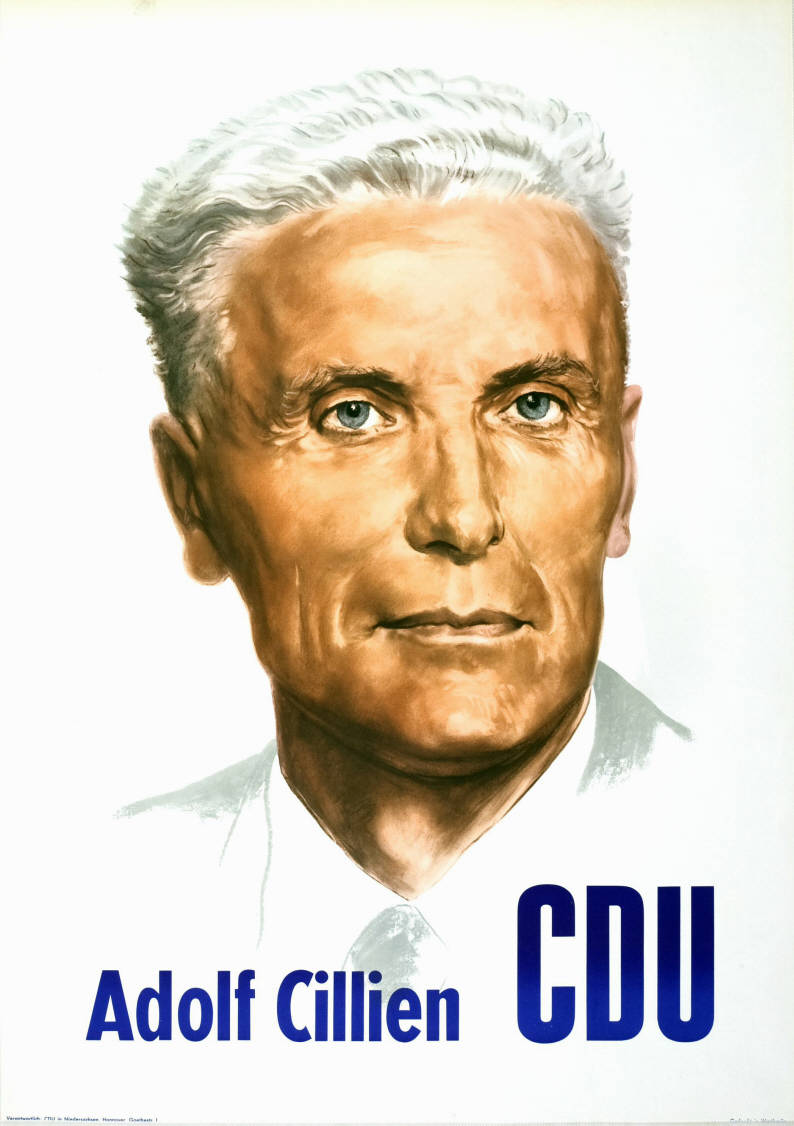
- Candidate poster of Adolf Cilliens for the state election in Lower Saxony 1959

Member of the Bundestag
- In office 6 October 1953 – 29 April 1960
- Preceded by: Heinrich-Wilhelm Ruhnke
- Succeeded by: Elisabeth Vietje
- Constituency: Hildesheim-Stadt und -Land (1953–1957); Stadt Hannover-Nord (1957–1960)

Member of the Landtag of Lower Saxony
- In office 9 December 1946 – 30 April 1951
- Preceded by: Constituency established
- Succeeded by: Hans Schmidt
- Constituency: State list (1946–1947); Burgdorf (1947–1951)

Personal details
- Born: Adolf Gustav Cillien; 23 April 1893 Volksberg, France
- Died: 29 April 1960 (aged 67) Hannover, Germany
- Party: Christian Democratic Union
- Education: University of Strasbourg; University of Göttingen

Adolf Cillien (23 April 1893 – 29 April 1960) was a German politician of the Christian Democratic Union (CDU) and former member of the German Bundestag.

== Political career ==
Cillien became a member of the appointed Hannover Landtag on 23 August 1946 until 29 October 1946. There he was chairman of the CDU state parliament faction as well as chairman of the committee for popular education, art and science. Between 9 December 1946 and 23 March 1947, he was a member of the appointed Lower Saxony State Parliament and subsequently became a member of the Lower Saxony State Parliament in the first legislative period between 20 April 1947 and 30 April 1951. There he became chairman of the CDU parliamentary group and later chairman of the DP/CDU parliamentary group (since 28 March 1951). On 9 May 1947 he was elected chairman of the Culture Committee.

Cillien was a member of the German Bundestag from 1953 until his death. He was directly elected in the constituency of Hildesheim-Stadt und -Land in 1953 and in the constituency of Stadt Hannover-Nord in 1957. During his parliamentary term, he was deputy chairman of the CDU/CSU parliamentary group throughout.

== Literature ==
Herbst, Ludolf; Jahn, Bruno (2002). Vierhaus, Rudolf (ed.). Biographisches Handbuch der Mitglieder des Deutschen Bundestages. 1949–2002 [Biographical Handbook of the Members of the German Bundestag. 1949–2002] (in German). München: De Gruyter - De Gruyter Saur. p. 1715. ISBN 978-3-11-184511-1.
