= Seelze =

- Town
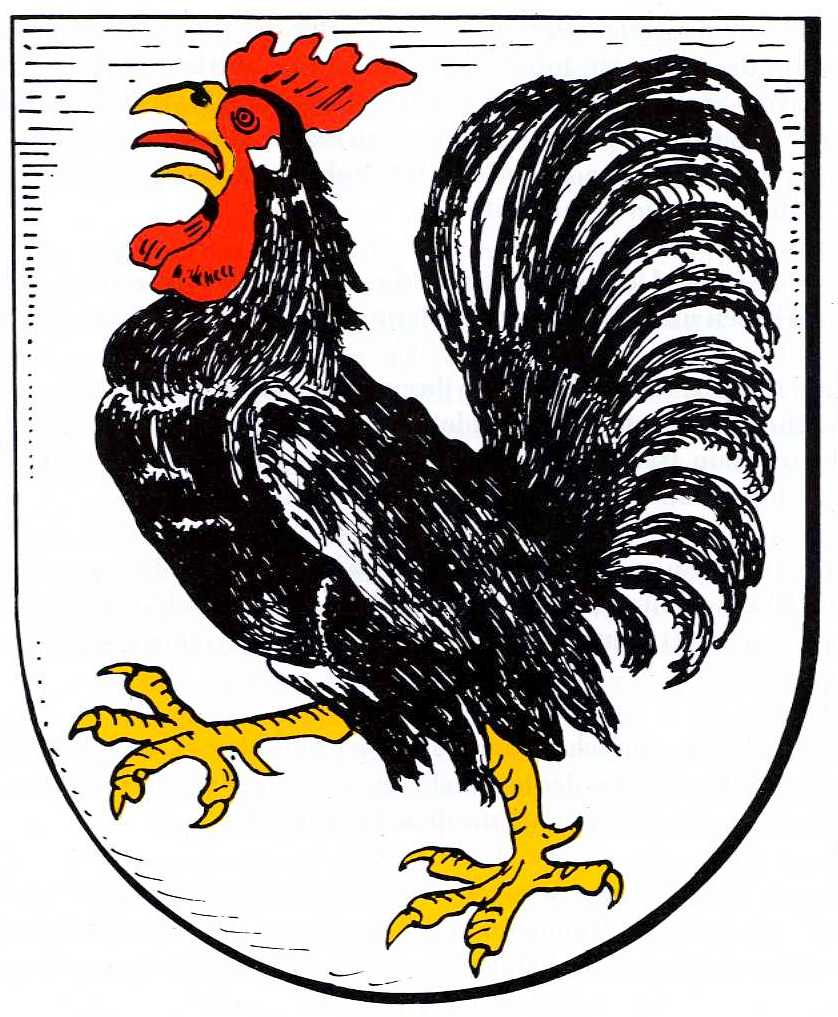
- Coat of arms

- Location of Seelze within Hanover district
- Interactive map of Seelze
- Location within Germany Location within Lower Saxony
- Coordinates: 52°23′46″N 09°35′53″E
- Country: Germany
- State: Lower Saxony
- District: Hanover

Government
  - Mayor (2021–26): Alexander Masthoff (SPD)

Area
  - Total: 54.08 km^{2} (20.88 sq mi)
- Elevation: 50 m (160 ft)

Population (2025-12-31)
  - Total: 34,383
  - Density: 635.8/km^{2} (1,647/sq mi)
- Time zone: UTC+01:00 (CET)
  - Summer (DST): UTC+02:00 (CEST)
- Postal codes: 30926
- Dialling codes: 05137, 0511, 05031
- Vehicle registration: H
- Website: www.seelze.de

Seelze (German pronunciation: [ˈzeːltsə]) is a town in the district of Hanover, in Lower Saxony, Germany. It is situated on the river Leine, approximately 10 kilometres (6.2 mi) west of Hanover. Today Seelze mainly plays the role of a bedroom town for commuters working in Hanover.

== Division of the town ==
- Seelze (city centre)
- Letter
- Almhorst
- Dedensen
- Lohnde
- Döteberg
- Harenberg
- Gümmer
- Velber
- Kirchwehren
- Lathwehren

== Museum ==
The local museum and museum of local history (Heimatmuseum Seelze) has been situated in Seelze since moving there in 2018 from a timber-framed building dating to 1856 located the incorporated district of Letter. Subjects of the museum include history of Seelze and its incorporated villages, history of the integration of German postwar refugees from former German territories that are now a part of Russia and Poland, and history of the Seelze marshalling yard (Rangierbahnhof). About three times a year special exhibitions are shown. The permanent exhibition shows a shoemaker's workshop, a hairdresser's shop from about 1920, a schoolroom of a village from about 1900, and a living room ("Gute Stube") of about 1900.

== Transport ==
=== Railway ===
Seelze and its subdivisions have three stations on the Hanover S-Bahn network: Letter, Seelze and Dedensen/Gümmer. All are located on the lines S1 and S2.

The Seelze marshalling yard is an important marshalling yard in Germany. It is located on the "Freight train bypass Hanover" (Wunstorf – Lehrte) and has 51 classification tracks, 6 main running tracks and workshops for freight cars and electric locomotives on a length of about 6 kilometres (3.7 mi). With about 200 freight trains a day beginning, ending or passing through the yard, it is a major European marshalling yard and one of the biggest in Germany.

== Twin towns – sister cities ==
Seelze is twinned with:

- Grand-Couronne, France
- Mosina, Poland
- Schkeuditz, Germany
