= Nordstadt (Hanover) =

District of Hanover (Germany)

Coordinates: 52°24′38″N 9°43′14″E

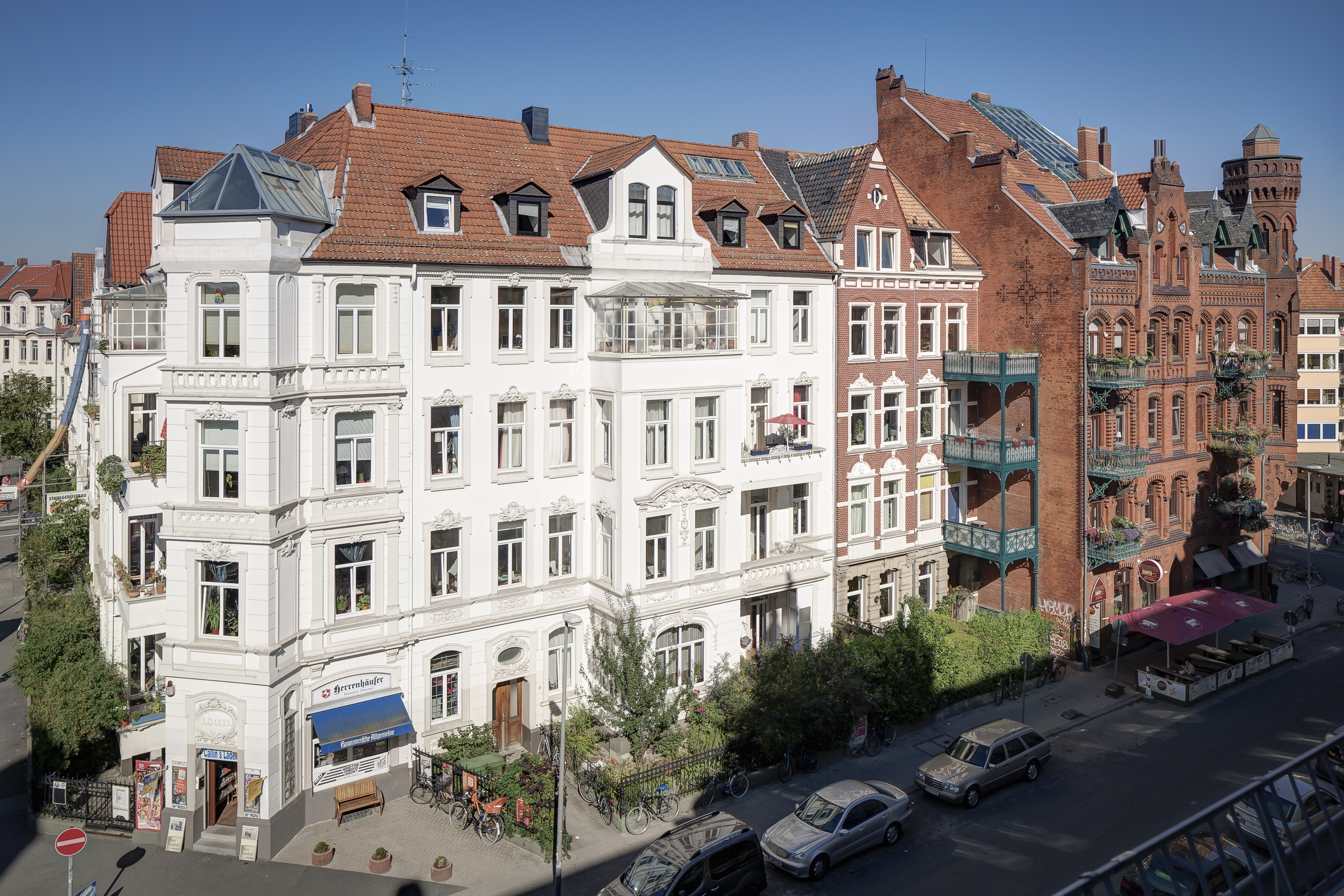
Gründerzeit architecture in Nordstadt

The Nordstadt (German pronunciation: [ˈnɔʁtˌʃtat], lit. 'North City') is the university quarter in the German city of Hanover. Part of the borough Hanover-Nord, it has 17,684 inhabitants (2020).

It was originally characterized by small factories and a big railway freightyard closed in 1996. During World War II large parts of the district were destroyed. Today, due to the university and cultural clubs, this district is a preferred residential area for students and people of immigrant background. An almost village-like atmosphere exists around the Luther Church (see photo) where a lot of pubs and small shops resides. Many alternative project groups have settled here and also numerous communes live in these houses.

The area of the former "Sprengel Chocolate Factory" was squatted and later legalized. It formed the base for the annual German punk festival called the Chaos Days, every first weekend in August.
