= Vahrenwald-List =

- Borough of Hanover
- Location of Vahrenwald-List in Hanover
- Interactive map of Vahrenwald-List
- Location within Germany Location within Lower Saxony
- Coordinates: 52.3986°N 9.7492°E
- Country: Germany
- State: Lower Saxony
- City: Hanover
- Subdivisions: 2

Area
  - Total: 8.28 km^{2} (3.20 sq mi)

Population (2020-12-31)
  - Total: 71,173
  - Density: 8,600/km^{2} (22,300/sq mi)
- Time zone: UTC+01:00 (CET)
  - Summer (DST): UTC+02:00 (CEST)
- Postal codes: 30161, 30163, 30165, 30177, 30655
- Dialling codes: 0511

Vahrenwald-List (German pronunciation: [ˈfaːʁənvalt ˈlɪst]; Eastphalian: Fahrnwoole-List) is the second borough (Stadtbezirke) of Hanover. With 71,173 inhabitants (2020), it is the most populous borough of the city consisting of the quarters (Stadtteile) Vahrenwald (24,986 inh.) and List (46,187 inh.). Since 2011, the SPD politician Irma Walkling-Stehmann holds the borough mayor office.

== Demographics ==

The graph shows the population development in the borough of Vahrenwald-List since 1 January 2005.

Year	Population	Building
1304		4
1689	180	26
1823	286	38
1859	574	73
1891	3.200	
2011	43.584	
2015	44.739	
