= National Beer Festival =

Argentine Oktoberfest
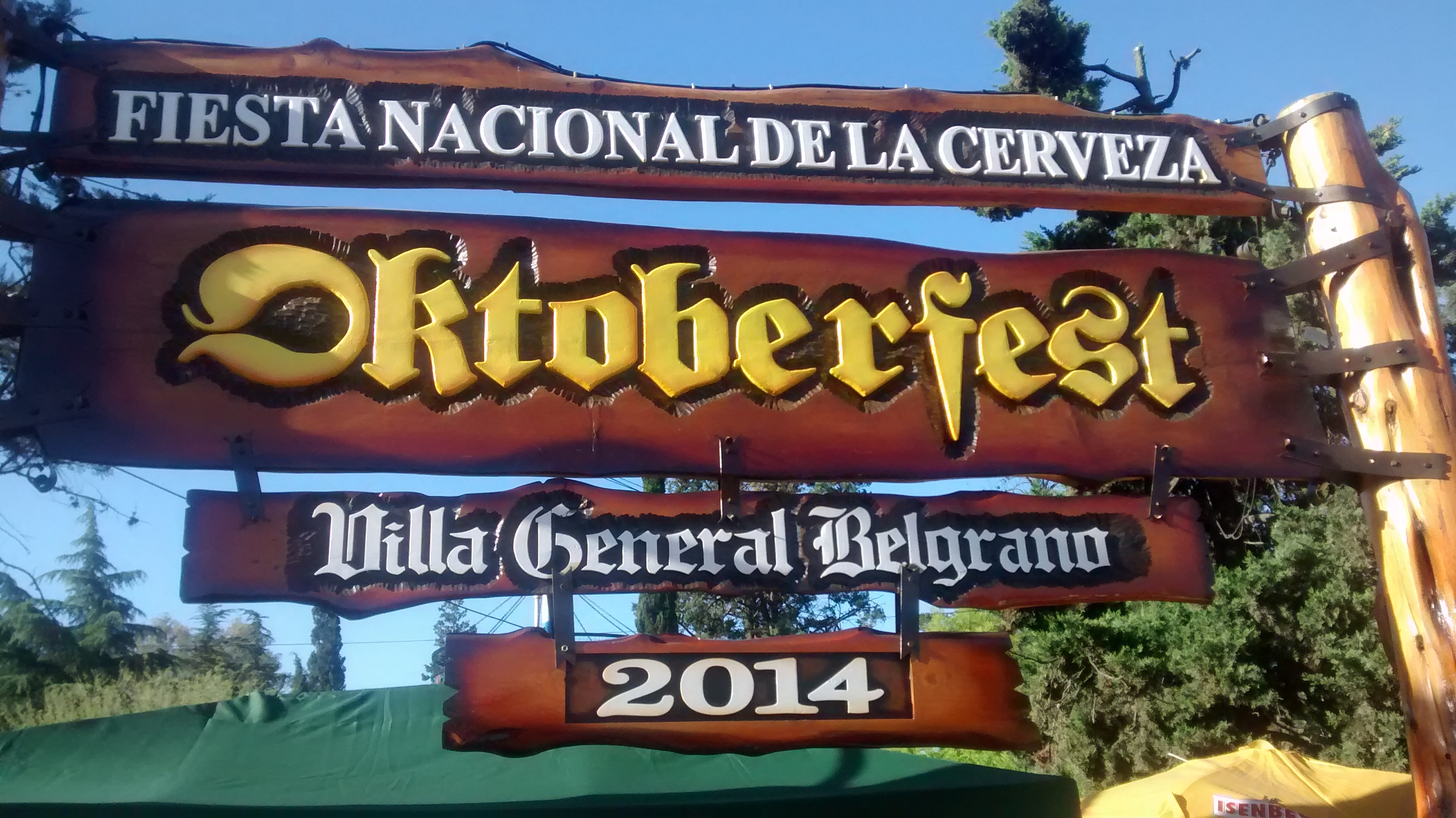
- Entrance sign to Parque Cervecero
- Observed by: Villa General Belgrano
- Type: Cultural
- Celebrations: Parades, music, Bavarian food and beer
- Frequency: Annual
- Related to: Oktoberfest celebrations

The National Beer Festival is Argentina's version of the German Oktoberfest. It has taken place every October since 1963, except 2020 due to COVID-19. This festival attracts thousands of tourists for two consecutive weekends. Today it is the largest in Latin America after Oktoberfest of Blumenau, Brazil.

== Villa General Belgrano ==
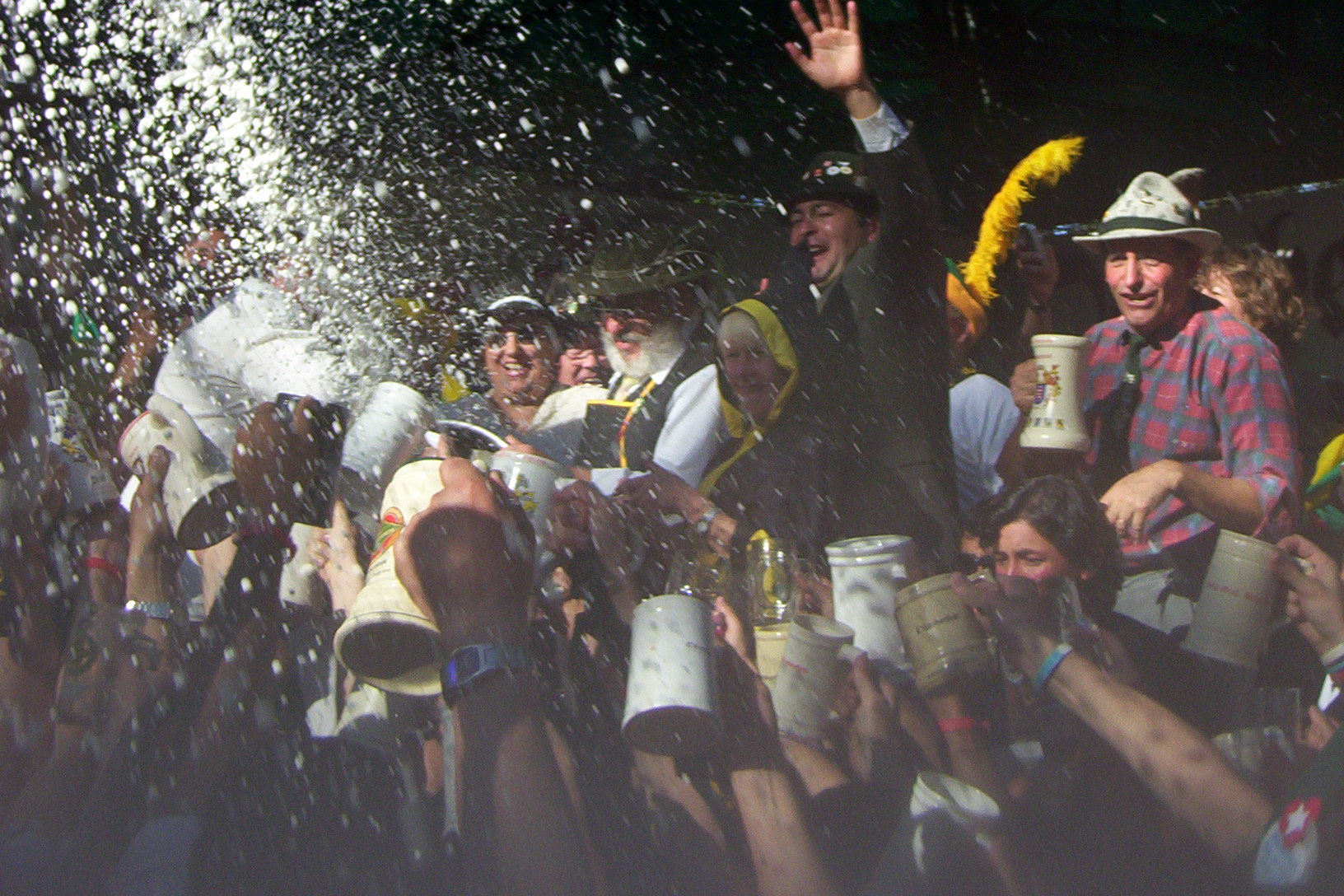
Espiche in 2006

Villa General Belgrano, Córdoba, founded in 1930, took the characteristics of an Alpine village with wooden houses, pitched red roofs, imported central European cuisine and all the habits such as traditional music, dances, parties, crafts and languages from Central Europe. The party emerged in the village in the 1960s by the hand of the first German immigrants.

It was traditionally developed in the Plaza Jose Hernandez, but in 1996 moved to a specially designed site, known in Argentina as the Brewer Park (Parque Cervecero in Spanish), with a procession through the streets of the town with carriages, dance groups, orchestras, villagers in traditional costumes, parades and the special dog sausages. Each year, the Queen of Oktoberfest Argentina (Reina del Oktoberfest Argentina) is selected in a ceremony held in the same park.

The years passed and the beer industry has been developed considerably. This party grew and began to call for a large number of tourists.
