= Oktoberfest celebrations =

Two-week festival in Munich and elsewhere

Oktoberfest
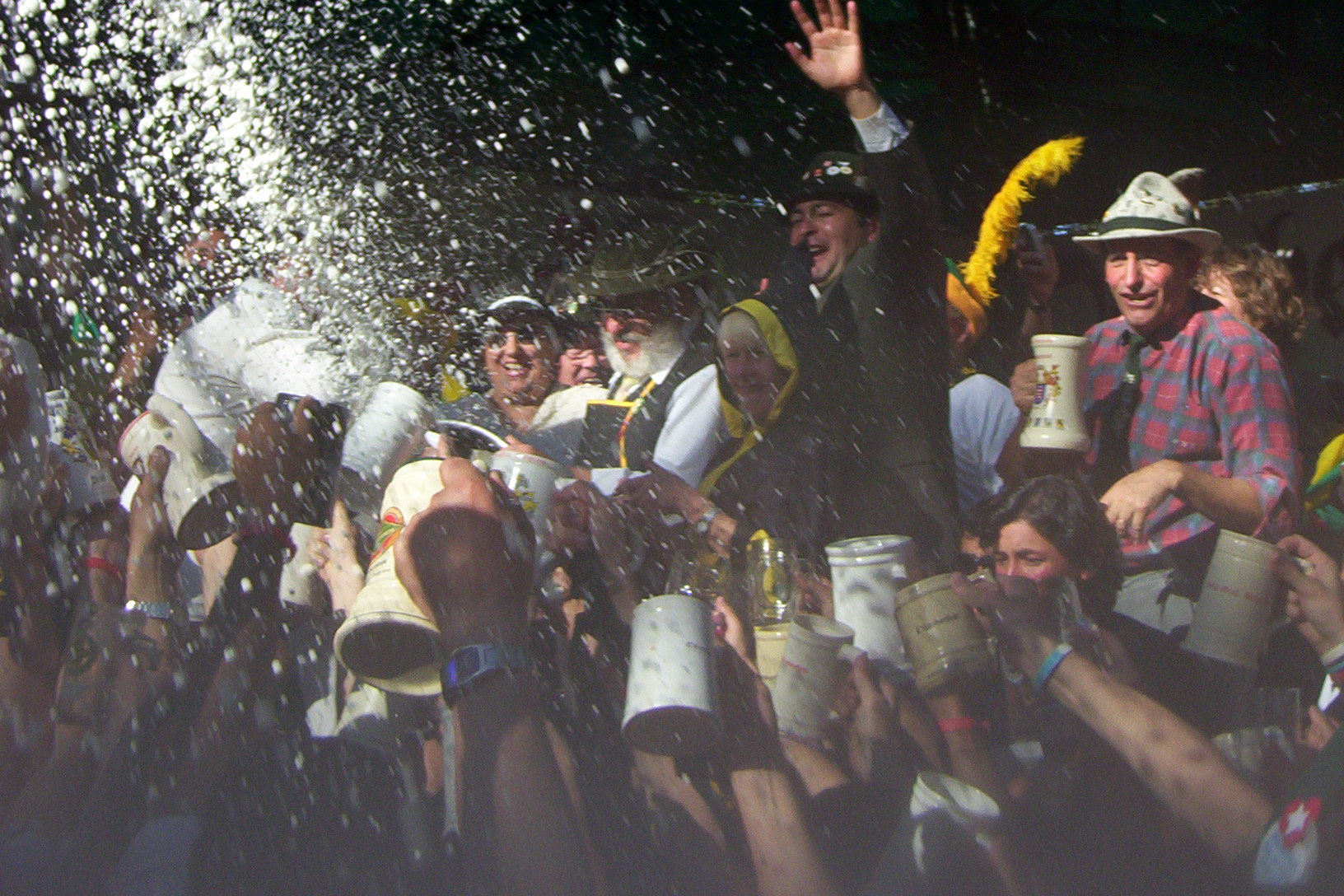
- Oktoberfest in Villa General Belgrano, Córdoba, Argentina
- Observed by: Germany, the Americas, Oceania and the world
- Type: Multinational
- Significance: Celebration of Bavarian culture
- Celebrations: Parades, food, music, folkloric dancing
- Date: Third Saturday in September
- 2025 date: September 20
- 2026 date: September 19
- 2027 date: September 18
- 2028 date: September 16
- Duration: 16 days
- Frequency: Annual
- Related to: Oktoberfest

The Oktoberfest is a two-week festival held each year in Munich, Bavaria during late September and early October. It is attended by six million people each year and has inspired numerous similar events using the name Oktoberfest in Bavaria and around the world.

== Around the world ==
Outside of Germany, three Oktoberfest events claim to be the largest after Munich’s, with over 700,000 visitors annually: the one in Blumenau, Brazil; the one in Cincinnati, Ohio, United States (700,000-800,000+ visitors); and the one in Kitchener, Ontario (formerly Berlin) and surrounding cities in Waterloo Region, Canada.

Other larger Oktoberfests include the Denver Oktoberfest Denver, Colorado, United States (450,000+ visitors). In New York City, there is even an Oktoberfest held under a big tent along the city's East River. However, the largest one mostly depends on specific year's numbers and varies with sources. Currently Oktoberfest is spreading to new geographical locations; starting in September 2007, Montreal began hosting its own Oktoberfest. One can find Oktoberfest celebrations mixing German traditions, food and beer with local culture outside of Germany.

=== Argentina ===
The National Beer Festival (Fiesta Nacional de la Cerveza) is Argentina's version of the German Oktoberfest. It has taken place every October since 1963 in Villa General Belgrano, Córdoba. The party emerged by the hand of the first German immigrants. This festival attracts thousands of tourists for two consecutive weekends.

=== Australia ===
In Australia, the universities are notorious in their celebrations of Oktoberfest every year, and as students graduated and moved on, this rolled over into pubs and restaurants in the university areas. After the 2012 Oktoberfest Party the University of New South Wales council banned the celebration of the festival on university campus grounds.

Following the end of many of the university based events a private event company, Nokturnl Events, launched 'Oktoberfest in the Gardens' in the Supreme Court Gardens, Perth on 7 October 2011. The event has since expanded to Adelaide, Melbourne and Sydney. The event now attracts over 50,000 patrons annually making it the largest Oktoberfest celebration in Australia.

Royal Melbourne Oktoberfest is held within the world heritage listed Royal Exhibition Building in Melbourne. Oktoberfest In The Gardens is held in Melbourne Showgrounds. Sydney also have their instalment of this event located within Australian Technology Park.

The Harmonie German Club, Canberra, holds an Oktoberfest over a three-day period every year in October. The festival has been held for over 50 years, and attracts a large number of visitors from Canberra and surrounding regions. In 2017 the event moved over the border to Queanbeyan in New South Wales and was held on 27 – 29 October.

Brisbane celebrates its annual Brisbane Oktoberfest, which is considered Australia's largest German festival. It is held over the first two weekends in October and offers a variety of German beers, wines and food, beer hall music and dance and singing performances.

Since 1984, an annual Oktoberfest celebration has been held in the seaside village of Emu Park on Queensland's Capricorn Coast. The event is held in the town's Bell Park and is organised by the local Lions Club.

=== Brazil ===
In Brazil there are several Oktoberfests around the country, most of them in towns settled by Germans and Austrians in the Southern portion of the country (like the Oktoberfest of Blumenau, the OktoberfestMissões of State of Rio Grande do Sul, in the municipality of Cerro Largo, the Oktoberfest of Itapiranga, the Oktoberfest of Igrejinha, the Oktoberfest of Santa Cruz do Sul, the Oktoberfest of Rolândia, the Oktoberfest of São Jorge d'Oeste, the Oktoberfest of Ponta Grossa, the Oktoberfest of Marechal Cândido Rondon, among others). There are also Oktoberfests in other portions of the country (like the Oktoberfest in der Altstadt von Olinda, the Oktoberfest Cearense in Guaramiranga, the Oktoberfest do Club Transatlântico and the Oktoberfest do Brooklin in São Paulo, among others). The Oktoberfest of Blumenau is one of the largest German festivals around the world, attracting around one million people every year.

=== Canada ===
In Canada there is an annual nine-day celebration spread over 18 days in Kitchener, Ontario. It attracts over 700,000 visitors annually. While its most popular draws are the beer-based celebrations, other cultural and entertainment attractions also fill the week. The most well-known is the parade held on Thanksgiving Day. As the only major parade on Canadian Thanksgiving, it is televised nationally. Coincidentally, the closing day of the Bavarian Oktoberfest also falls on the German equivalent of Thanksgiving, Erntedankfest.

The twin cities and surrounding area have a long history of German roots. Kitchener was formerly named Berlin. A significant portion of the population of Kitchener and surrounding areas identify themselves as being of German descent, and many still speak German. A common phrase at the celebrations is Gemütlichkeit, German for congeniality, or warm friendliness.

Oktoberfest celebrations are also held annually in Sherbrooke, Quebec at the beginning of October. The one night event is held by Université de Sherbrooke's Engineering Students' Association. It draws approximately 6,000 revellers each year.

Two smaller events take place in the Greater Toronto Area:

- Toronto Oktoberfest at Ontario Place
- Unionville Oktoberfest Heritage Days in Unionville, Ontario

=== Chile ===
In Chile bierfests are celebrated in Valdivia, Puerto Octay, Puerto Varas, Frutillar and Llanquihue and Malloco.

=== China ===
- Qingdao, with its Qingdao International Beer Festival, has the largest Oktoberfest celebration in all of China with celebrations since 1991. Around 4 million have participated.
- Beijing, held at the Paulaner Brauhaus in the Kempinski Hotel since 1993.
- Shanghai, at the Paulaner Brauhaus and held since 1997.
- In Anting New Town, designed with German-style elements and architecture, Oktoberfest (and other German holidays) are celebrated as community events.
- Hong Kong, Marco Polo German Bierfest has been held since 1992. The celebration takes place in mid October to early November at Marco Polo Hong Kong Hotel in Harbour City, Tsim Sha Tsui. Other events also take place in other spots in Hong Kong:
  - Oktoberfest at Happy Valley Racecourse
  - Erdinger Oktoberfest at Indian Recreation Club
- Macau MGM Macau hosted their first Oktoberfest in 2011

=== Colombia ===
In Colombia it is sponsored by Bavaria Brewery. A series of concerts and events are held along different cities, with special emphasis in those with German background like Bucaramanga.

=== India ===
Oktoberfest celebrations have become very popular with Indian hotels, restaurants and malls. Numerous such events happen in Indian metros in October. The most significant one is held since 2009 by the Indo-German Chamber of Commerce in Pune, traditionally a large hub of German companies in India.

=== Japan ===
Yokohama Japan holds an Oktoberfest celebration annually from late September through mid-October at its historic Red Brick Warehouse.

=== Malaysia ===
Oktoberfest has been celebrated in Penang and Kuala Lumpur since the 1970s. Celebrations are said to be the liveliest in Penang, with annual festivities organised by the Malaysian German Society. Since 2017, the Oktoberfest celebrations in Penang have included non-alcoholic beverages alongside beer.

=== Palestine ===
An Oktoberfest celebration is held in the town of Taybeh, in the (Taybeh Brewery). The first Taybeh Oktoberfest was held in 2005.

=== Philippines ===
Oktoberfest beer and music festival celebrations held usually from September up to December. It is organized by San Miguel Brewery, which is the makers of San Miguel Beer and other alcoholic beverages. The 2015 edition of their Oktoberfest, was coincided with the 125th anniversary of San Miguel Beer Pale Pilsen.

=== Russia ===
- Moscow Oktoberfest is held Red Square.

=== South Africa ===
Oktoberfest is celebrated annually in mid September at various German schools around the country most notably the Deutsche Schule Pretoria.

=== Sri Lanka ===
Oktoberfest celebration is held in Colombo, Sri Lanka every year.

=== United States ===
German-Americans are the largest self-reported ancestral group in the United States, and despite many German-Americans not having Bavarian ancestry, Oktoberfest is observed as a "typically German" celebration. There are hundreds of large and small Oktoberfest celebrations held annually throughout the country, the largest being Oktoberfest Zinzinnati in Cincinnati, Ohio.

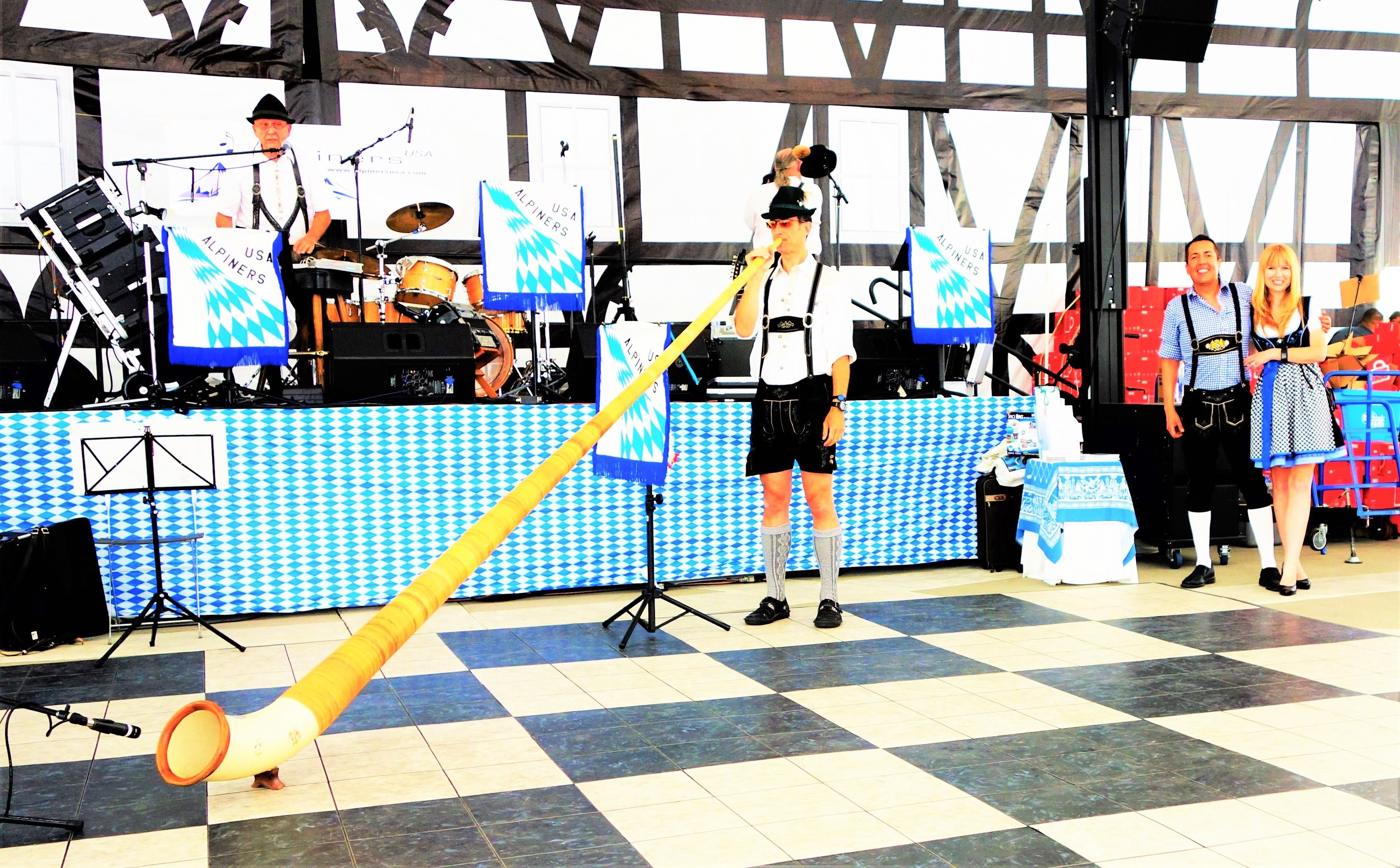
Oktoberfest in Redwood City, California

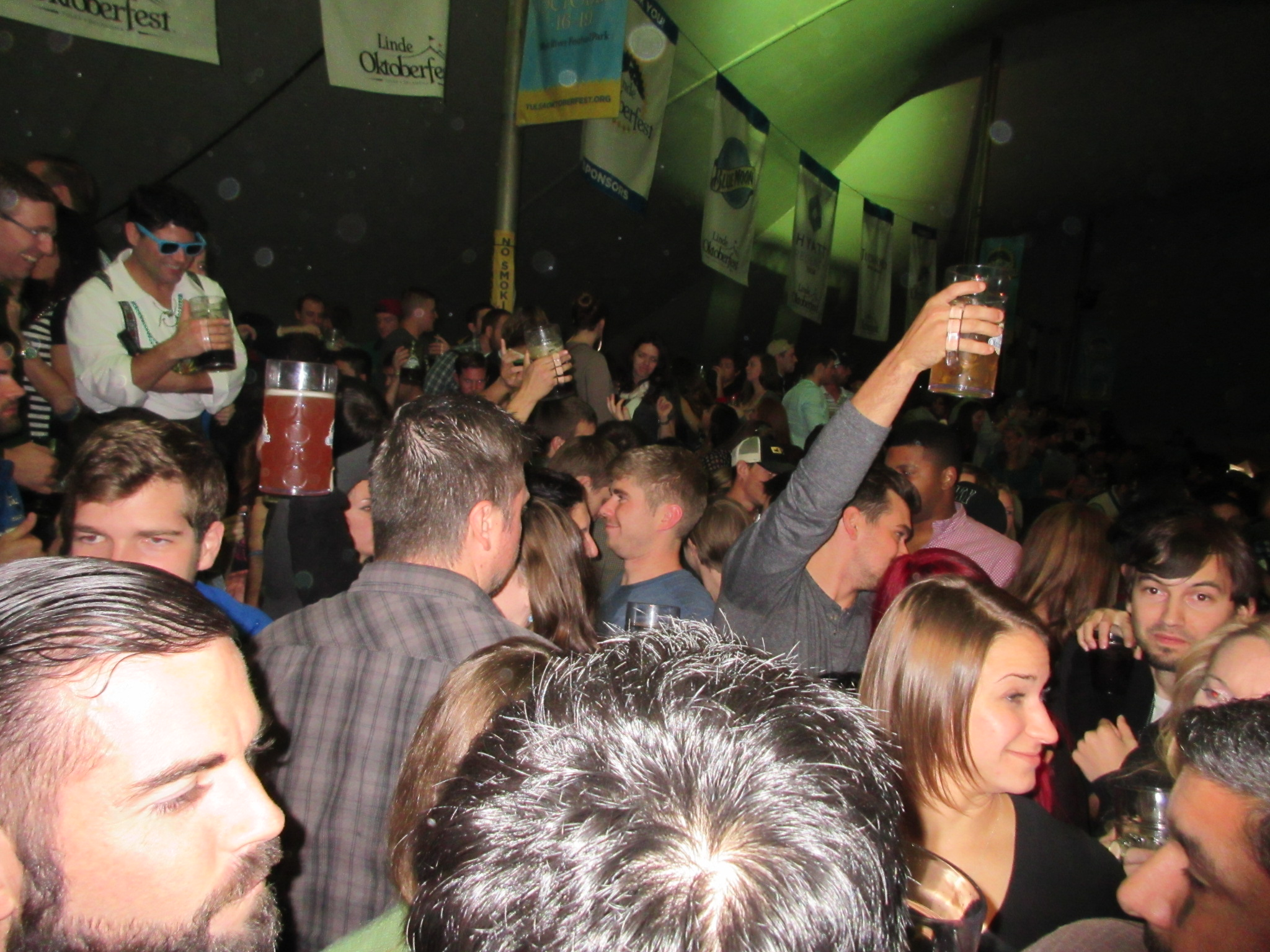
Oktoberfest in Tulsa, Oklahoma

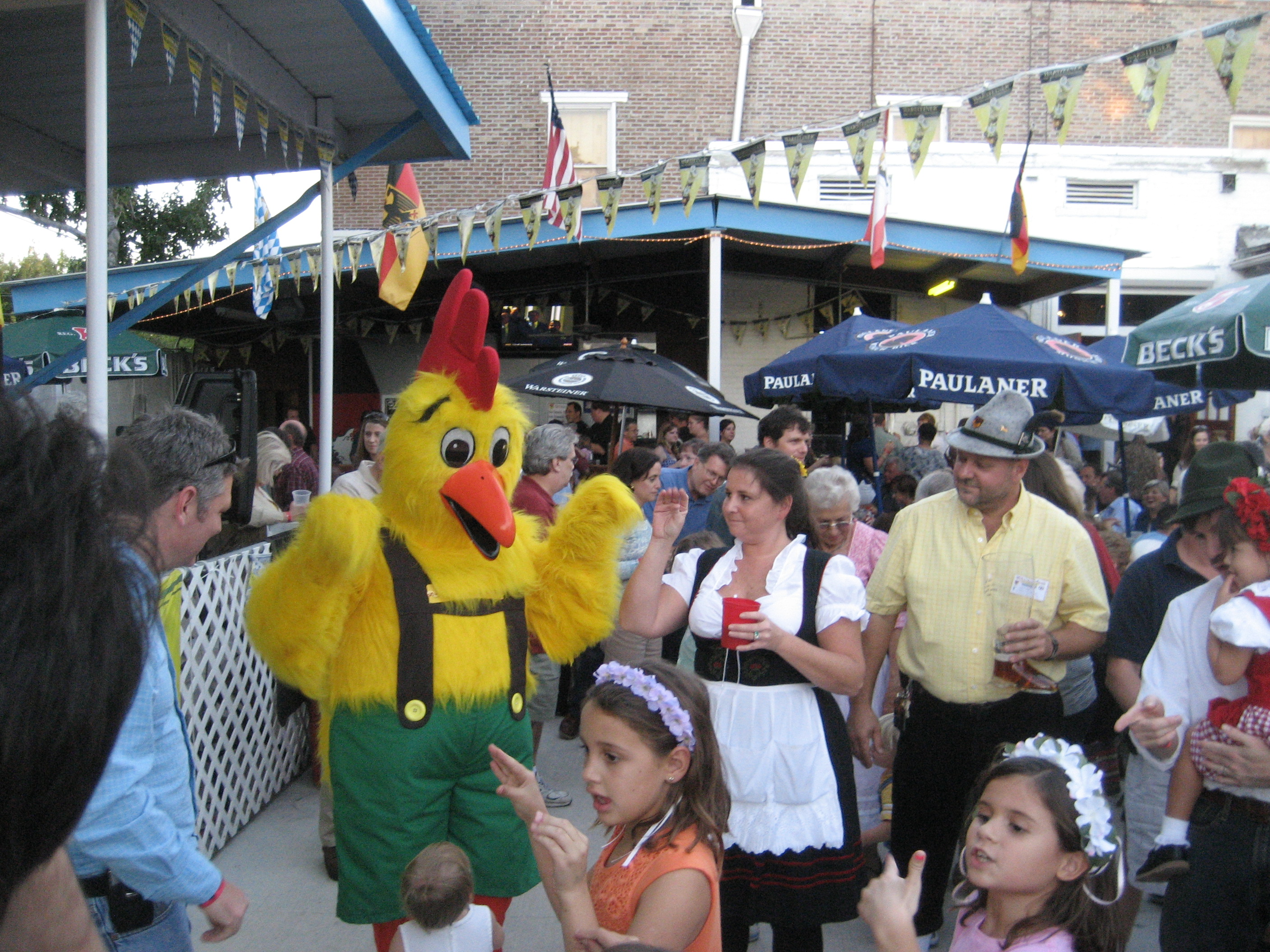
Oktoberfest celebrations in New Orleans

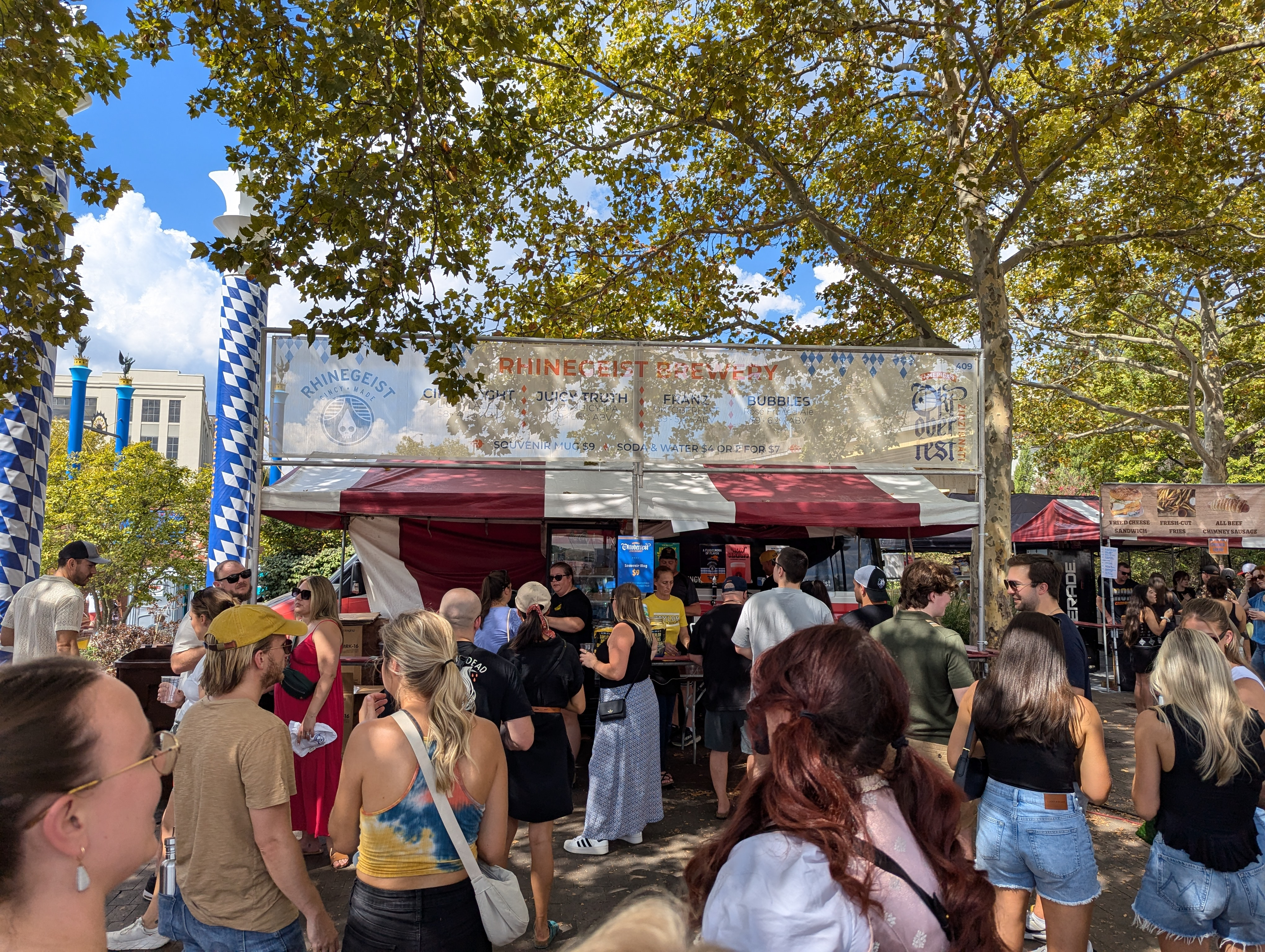
Oktoberfest Zinzinnati in Cincinnati

Known for its large German immigrant population, the Commonwealth of Pennsylvania and its historic Pennsylvania Dutch (Pennsylvania Deutsch) population are well known to have many Oktoberfest celebrations during the months of September and October. These celebrations became increasingly popular among the general Commonwealth population in the later half of the 20th century with the rise of microbreweries, and with the opening of authentic German brew houses such as Hofbräuhaus in Pittsburgh, PA.

Other major celebrations across the United States include those at:

- Old World Oktoberfest in Huntington Beach, CA
- Cullman, Alabama;
- Nashville, Tennessee's oldest-running festival is the Nashville Oktoberfest, in the downtown Germantown neighborhood. In 2015, more than 140,000 people attended. In 2016, official attendance was estimated as over 215,000 people, making the Nashville Oktoberfest the second largest in the USA.
- Tempe Town Lake in Tempe, Arizona
- Margaret T. Hance Park in Phoenix, Arizona
- The Phoenix Club in Anaheim, California
- Big Bear City, California
- Campbell, California
- Chico, California Located at Sierra Nevada Brewing Co..
- Oakland, California
- Sacramento, California
- San Francisco, California
- Alpine Village in West Carson, California
- San Diego, California
- Montrose, California
- Denver, Colorado
- The Colorado Council of Arts, Science and Culture hosts Parker Oktoberfest in Parker, Colorado
- the Delaware Sängerbund in Newark, Delaware
- Wickham Park (Melbourne, Florida)
- Cape Coral, Florida (largest in Florida)
- Miami, Florida
- Helen, Georgia, a Bavarian-themed town
- Hofbrauhaus Chicago in Rosemont, Illinois, a German celebration, starting in 2013, expecting many beer lovers
- Indianapolis, Indiana
- Jasper, Indiana
- Seymour, Indiana
- Amana, Iowa
- Hays, Kansas
- Danville, Kentucky
- Mandeville, Louisiana
- Frankenmuth, Michigan (The first Oktoberfest outside Munich that the Parliament and the City of Munich sanctioned);
- Grand Rapids, Michigan
- New Ulm, Minnesota (In 2002 the Census Bureau released a report showing 65.85% of population with German ancestry, the greatest proportion among US cities).
- Jefferson City, Missouri
- Hermann, Missouri
- St. Louis, Missouri
- Hattiesburg, Mississippi
- Norfolk, Nebraska
- Sidney, Nebraska
- Germania Park in Rockaway Township, New Jersey
- Red River, New Mexico
- Irondequoit, New York
- Hickory, North Carolina
- the Ohio State Fair grounds and the Germania Singing and Sport Society in Columbus, Ohio
- Berea, Ohio
- Minster, Ohio
- Wilmington, Ohio
- Tulsa, Oklahoma
- Mt. Angel, Oregon; Mt. Angel has held an Oktoberfest (in September) since 1966.
- Sertoma Field in Walhalla, South Carolina
- Saxonburg, Pennsylvania , Sprankle's Octoberfest (Weekend after Labor Day) since 2019.
- East Allegheny (Pittsburgh), Pennsylvania
- Reading, Pennsylvania
- Newport, Rhode Island
- Kingsport, Tennessee
- Addison, Texas
- Boerne, Texas
- Fredericksburg, Texas
- Galveston, Texas
- New Braunfels, Texas (called Wurstfest). Began in 1961. Attendance typically ranges from 125,000 to 200,000 people.
- Slaton, Texas ("Slaton Saint Joseph Sausage Festival," held on the third Sunday of October)
- Shiner, Texas
- at least 11 other Texas towns
- Snowbird, Utah, a resort in the mountains above Salt Lake City
- Lovettsville, Virginia;
- Martinsville, Virginia
- neighborhood of Fremont, Seattle, Washington
- Leavenworth, Washington, a Bavarian-themed town
- Appleton, Wisconsin
- La Crosse, Wisconsin, called Oktoberfest, USA
- New Glarus, Wisconsin
- Milwaukee, Wisconsin
- many others

=== Vietnam ===
Oktoberfest celebrations are co-organized annually by the German Business Association in Hanoi and Ho Chi Minh City. In 2012, Oktoberfest Vietnam in Ho Chi Minh City celebrated its 20th year with a seven-day event.

=== Venezuela ===
In Venezuela, specifically in Colonia Tovar, it is held annually since 1970. Sometimes music groups have been invited from Germany to interpret typical music. The Historic center of Colonia Tovar has a population of about 10,000 inhabitants and it is estimated that during the days of the event the town receives twice that in visitors. In Greater Caracas, it's celebrated in the suburb of El Hatillo, it's sponsored by the embassy of Germany and Poland, and the German-speaking Catholic Community.

=== Zambia ===
Oktoberfest is celebrated annually in Zambia around 10 October at Fringilla, Chisamba, Central Province and many other various locations in Lusaka.

== Europe ==
=== Germany ===
==== Bavaria ====
Note that traditional fairs in Bavaria, called Dult, Volksfest (popular festival) etc., are similar to the Oktoberfest in nature (not in size), but not called Oktoberfest as they did not arise in imitation of it. Of these, the Gäubodenvolksfest of Straubing enjoys particular fame.

===== Munich - The Original =====
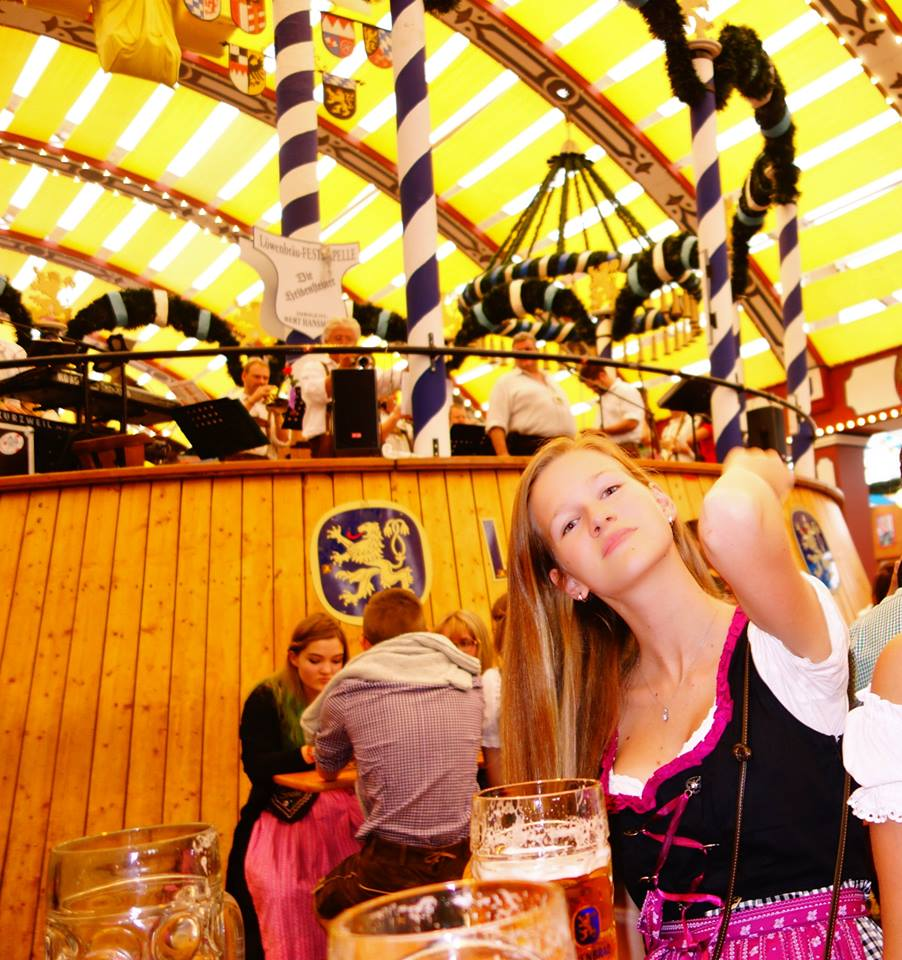
Oktoberfest in Munich, Germany

==== Hannover ====
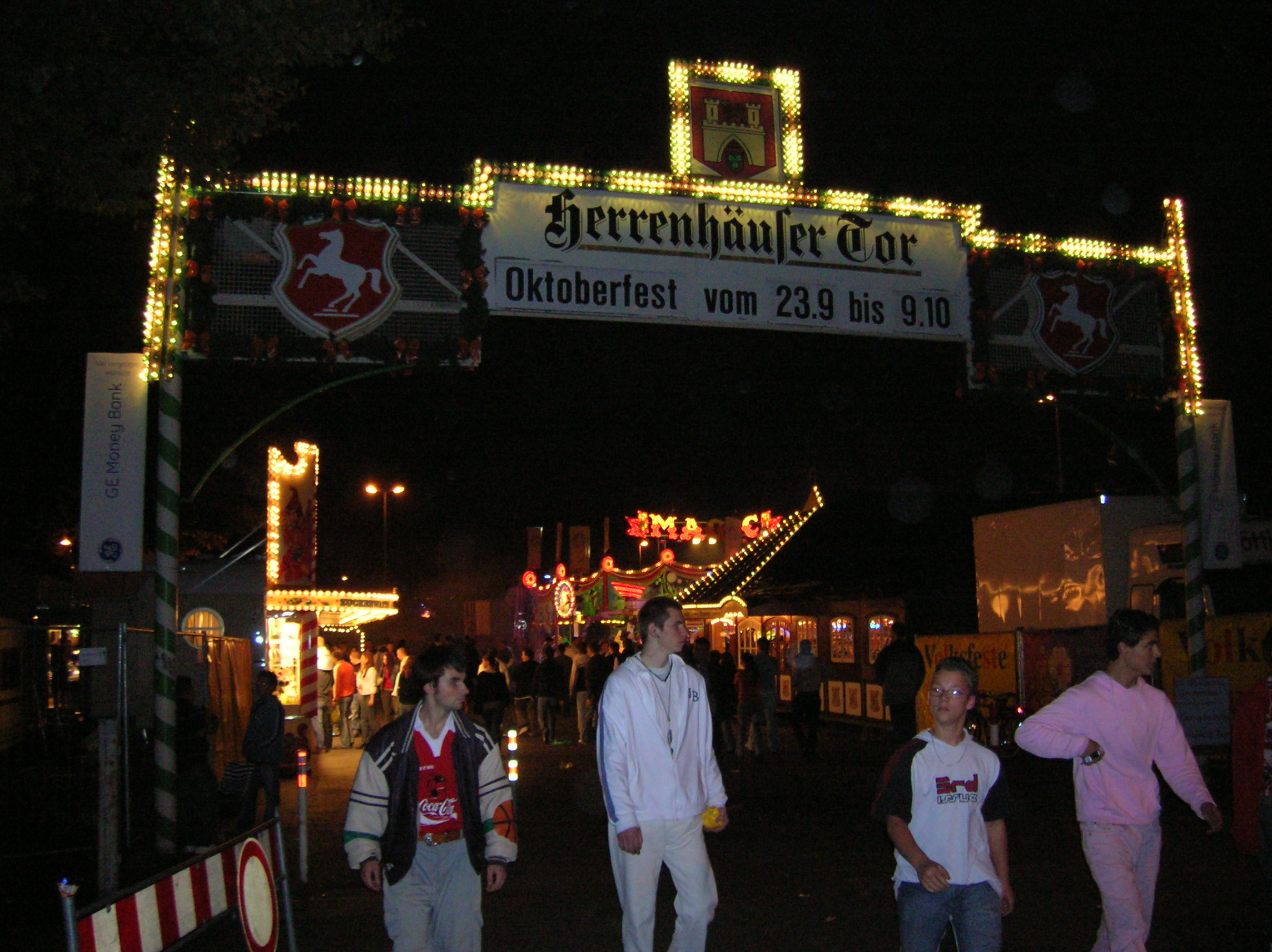
An entrance arch to Hanover Oktoberfest in 2005

The Hanover Oktoberfest is a fair that takes place every year at the end of September or at the beginning of October. It usually lasts 17 days and features 140 rides and booths, two large beer tents seating more than a thousand people each, and numerous stands, beer gardens and five small beer tents offering food and refreshments. The program consists of a dirndl competition, three fireworks, two family days, a hand lantern parade for kids and a backstage tour. You can get a special festival-beer from the local brewery Herrenhäuser Brewery, the Lüttje Lage (an alcoholic speciality of Hannover) and many foods from Lower Saxony and Bavaria. With around one million visitors each year, it is the second-largest Oktoberfest in Germany.

==== Berlin ====
Oktoberfest in Berlin continues to grow. Several large areas, including Alexanderplatz and Zentraler Festplatz, are turned into Bavarian-like beer and food tents. Live brass Bavarian bands play at venues around town and people can be seen in traditional Bavarian dress around the city. Many places also serve the official Oktoberfest beers that are made in Munich. These events last from mid-September to early-mid October, and are the largest Oktoberfest events outside of Munich.

=== Poland ===
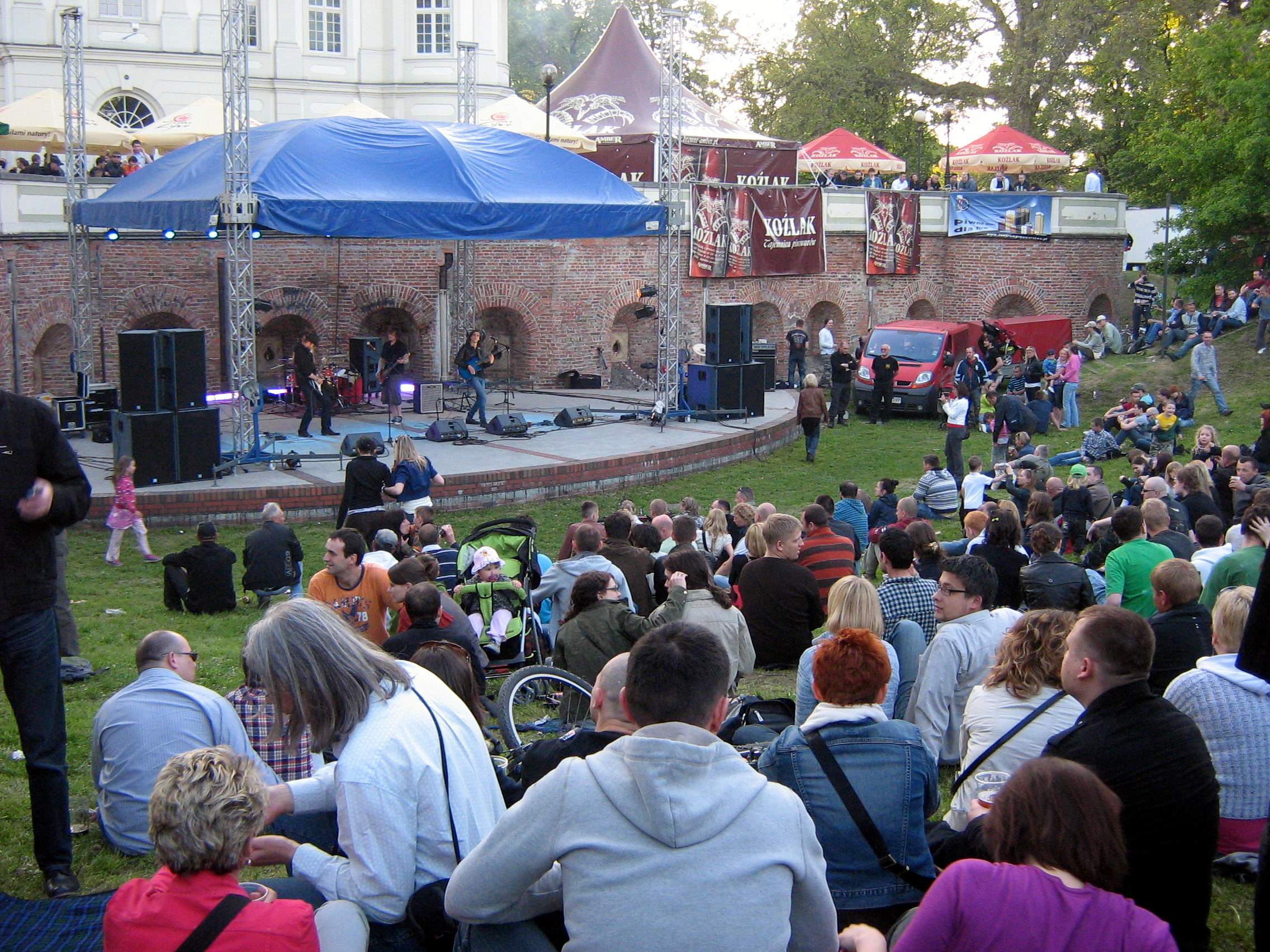
Festival of Good Beer in Wrocław, Poland

== See also ==
- Beer festival
- Cannstatter Volksfest - Volksfest held in the Swabian city of Stuttgart at a similar time of year to Oktoberfest
- German diaspora

== Notes ==
- Oktoberfest in Shanghai, China
