= Delaware Sängerbund =

Coordinates: 39°40′26.4″N 75°41′53.8″W

The Delaware Sängerbund (German for Singers Alliance, also spelled "Saengerbund") is a German-American club located near Newark, Delaware.

The club has close to 1000 members who meet at the club house in Ogletown, Delaware. Besides an active chorus, the club sponsors a Bavarian folk dancing group ("Enzian Volkstanzgruppe"), a Ladies' Auxiliary in charge of food preparation (the "Ladies of the Delaware Sängerbund"), youth soccer teams (the "DSB Kickers"), a teenage group, a genealogy group, and German language classes for both adults and children.

== History ==
The Delaware Sängerbund was founded in March 1853 by 16 German men as a singing society. It soon became an important social club for the members and their families and newly arriving immigrants. The club was located at 205 East Sixth Street in Wilmington, Delaware, known as the "German Hall", from 1883 until 1965, when urban development made a move necessary. The society has been in continuous existence since 1853, making it one of the oldest clubs in Delaware.

The Delaware Sängerbund and the German community of Wilmington held the first "Volksfest" in September 1883 in the Schuetzen Park of Wilmington located in the area of Wawaset Park. It was held there for the next several years. To celebrate the 50th anniversary of the society, the Delaware Sängerbund organized another Volksfest, this time at the new Brandywine Springs Park. The festivals continued annually until 1912. When the Delaware Sängerbund celebrated its 125th anniversary in 1978 with a large tent to accommodate all the guests, the idea of having an annual festival was reborn, and the first Oktoberfest in the Munich style was held in 1979. Since then, the Delaware Sängerbund Oktoberfest has become a much anticipated tradition in Delaware.

There was no Oktoberfest in 2020. It resumed in 2021.

== Annual events ==
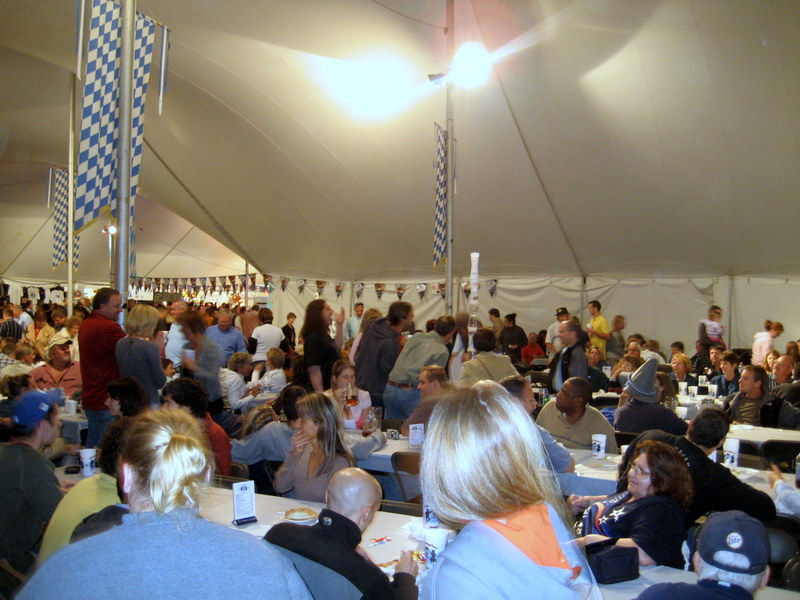
Under the big tent at the 2008 Oktoberfest

The Delaware Sängerbund shares its German heritage and traditions with the public at two annual events: The "Oktoberfest" held on the third weekend in September and the "Christkindlmarkt" (Christmas Festival and Bazaar) held on the second Saturday in November.

The Delaware Sängerbund Oktoberfest is named after the widely known festival held each year in Munich, Bavaria. There, the first Oktoberfest was celebrated as a wedding festival of the Bavarian crown prince Ludwig on October 12, 1810. In later years, the festival commemorating the wedding grew larger and longer, first in the city, then countrywide. To ensure milder weather for all the outdoor activities, the beginning of the sixteen-day-long celebrations was moved into September, only the last weekend falling into October. The name "Oktoberfest" remained with the fair.

Each year on the third weekend in September, the Delaware Sängerbund recreates the atmosphere of the Oktoberfest for the people of Delaware and the surrounding states. More than 15,000 visitors come to the large tent erected on the club grounds to enjoy dancing to German brass bands, sample homemade potato salad and sauerkraut, and watch performances of "Schuhplattler" dances by the Enzian Volkstanzgruppe. Unlimited amusement rides for children are included in the entrance fee.

The custom of bringing whole villages and towns together for a festival is much older than the Oktoberfest associated with Munich. Throughout Germany, people celebrate a "Volksfest" (literally: people festival) to commemorate the founding of a town, a church dedication or an historic event.

== See also ==
- Oktoberfest celebrations
- Volksfest
