= Herrenhausen-Stöcken =

- Borough of Hanover
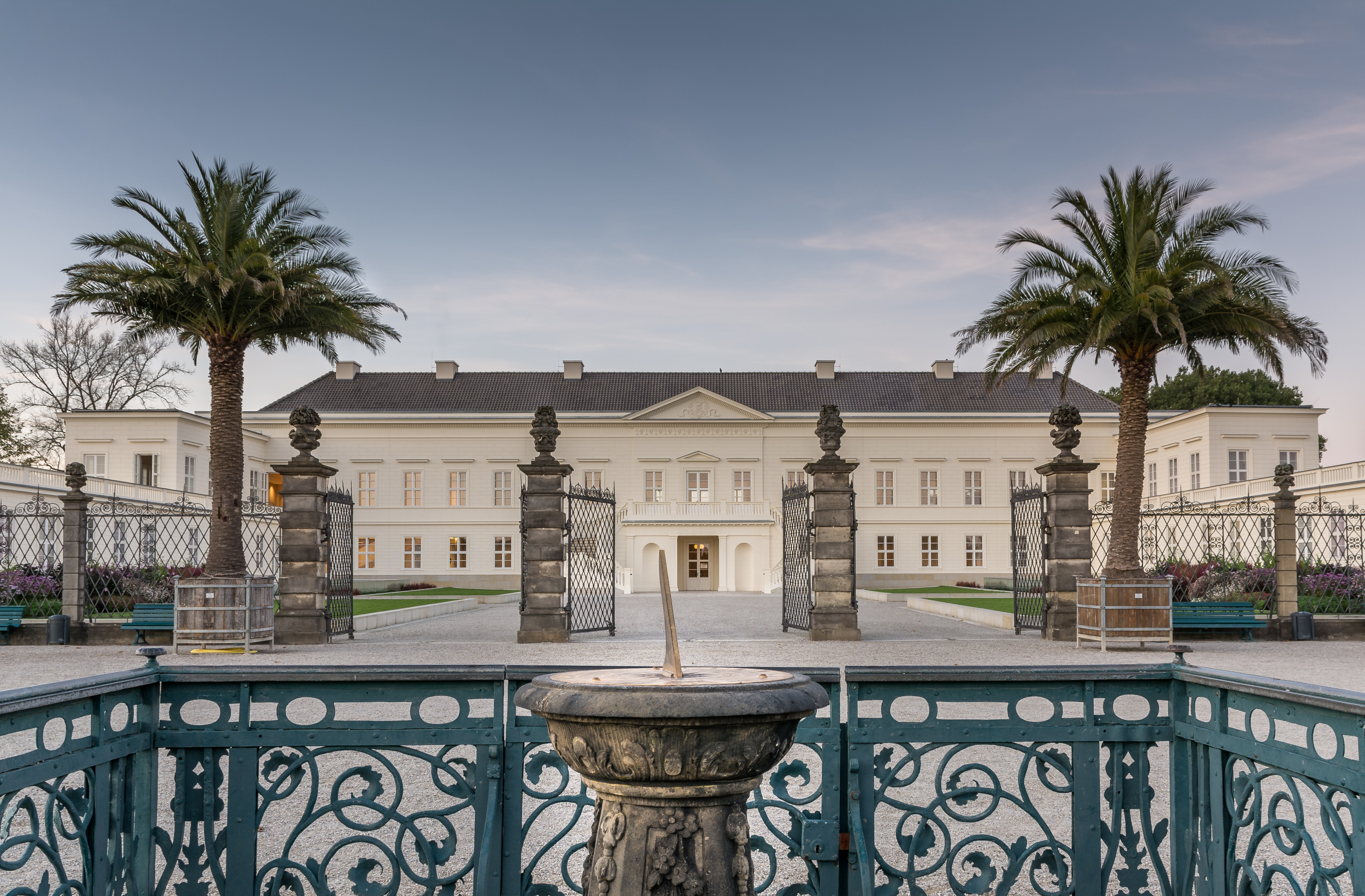
- The reconstructed Herrenhausen Palace in 2014

- Location of Herrenhausen-Stöcken in Hanover
- Interactive map of Herrenhausen-Stöcken
- Location within Germany Location within Lower Saxony
- Coordinates: 52°24′14″N 9°41′08″E
- Country: Germany
- State: Lower Saxony
- City: Hanover
- Subdivisions: 6 quarters

Area
  - Total: 21.14 km^{2} (8.16 sq mi)

Population (2020-12-31)
  - Total: 37,543
  - Density: 1,776/km^{2} (4,600/sq mi)
- Time zone: UTC+01:00 (CET)
  - Summer (DST): UTC+02:00 (CEST)
- Dialling codes: 0511

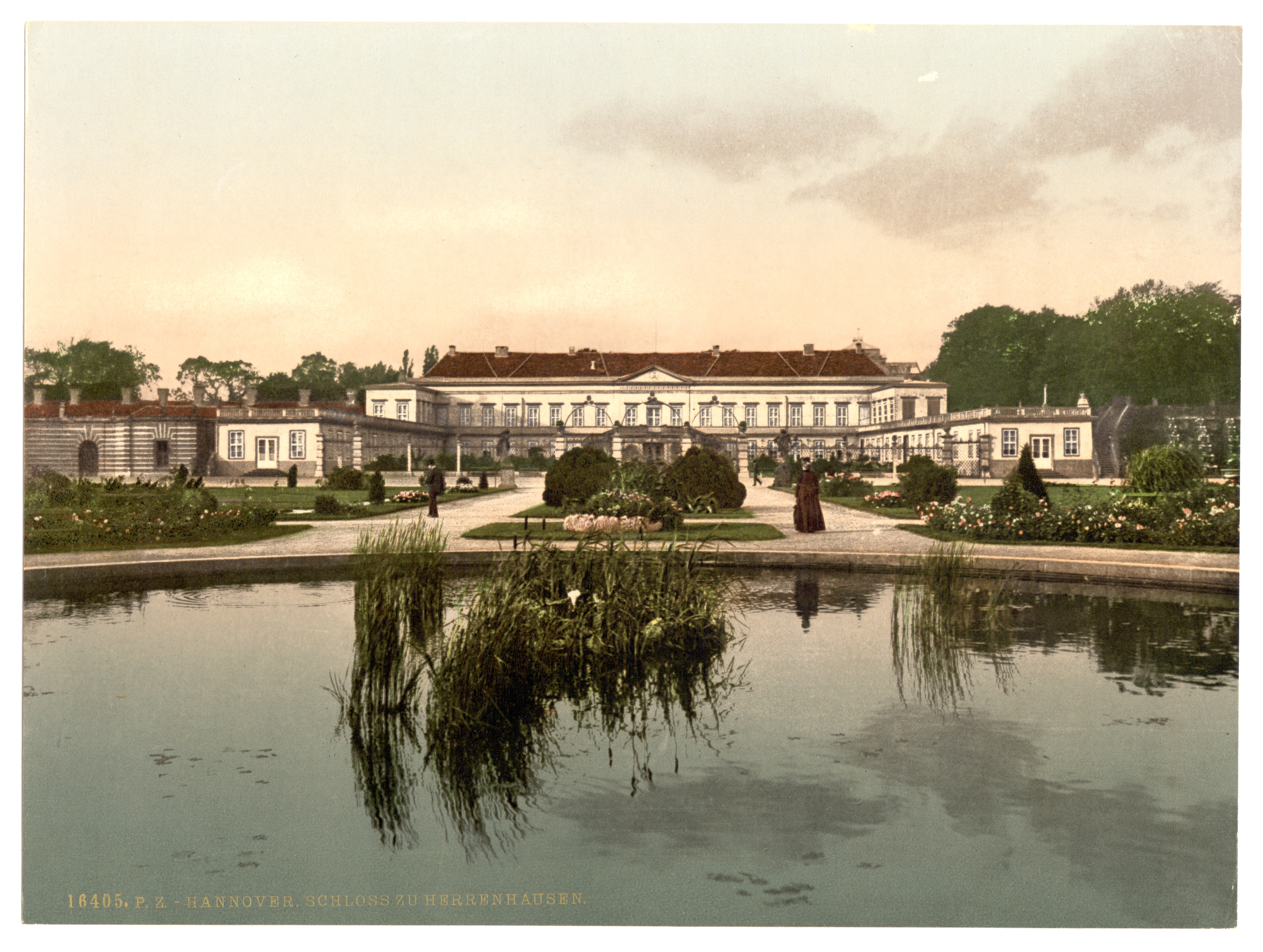
Herrenhausen Palace, c. 1895

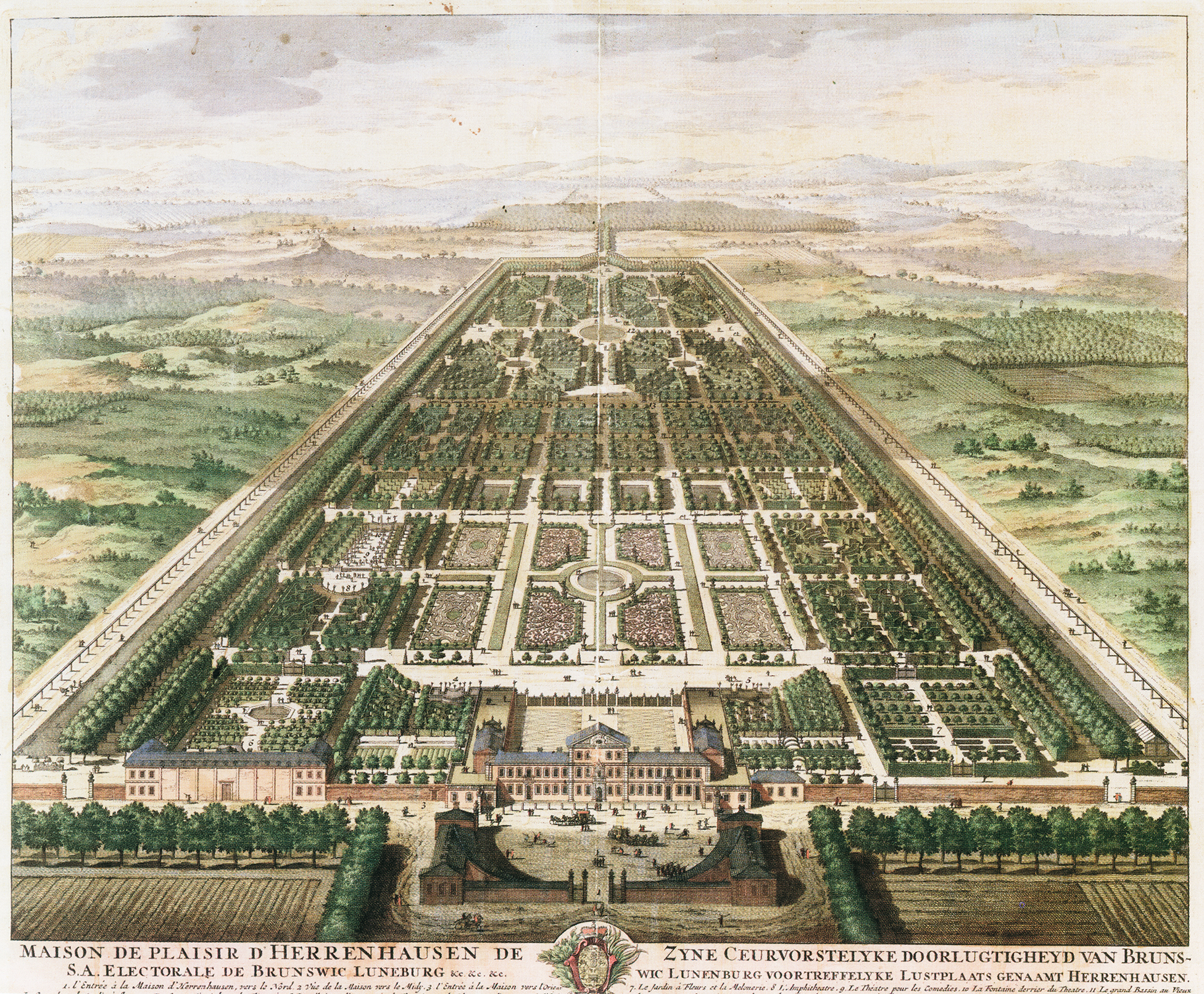
Herrenhausen Gardens, c. 1708

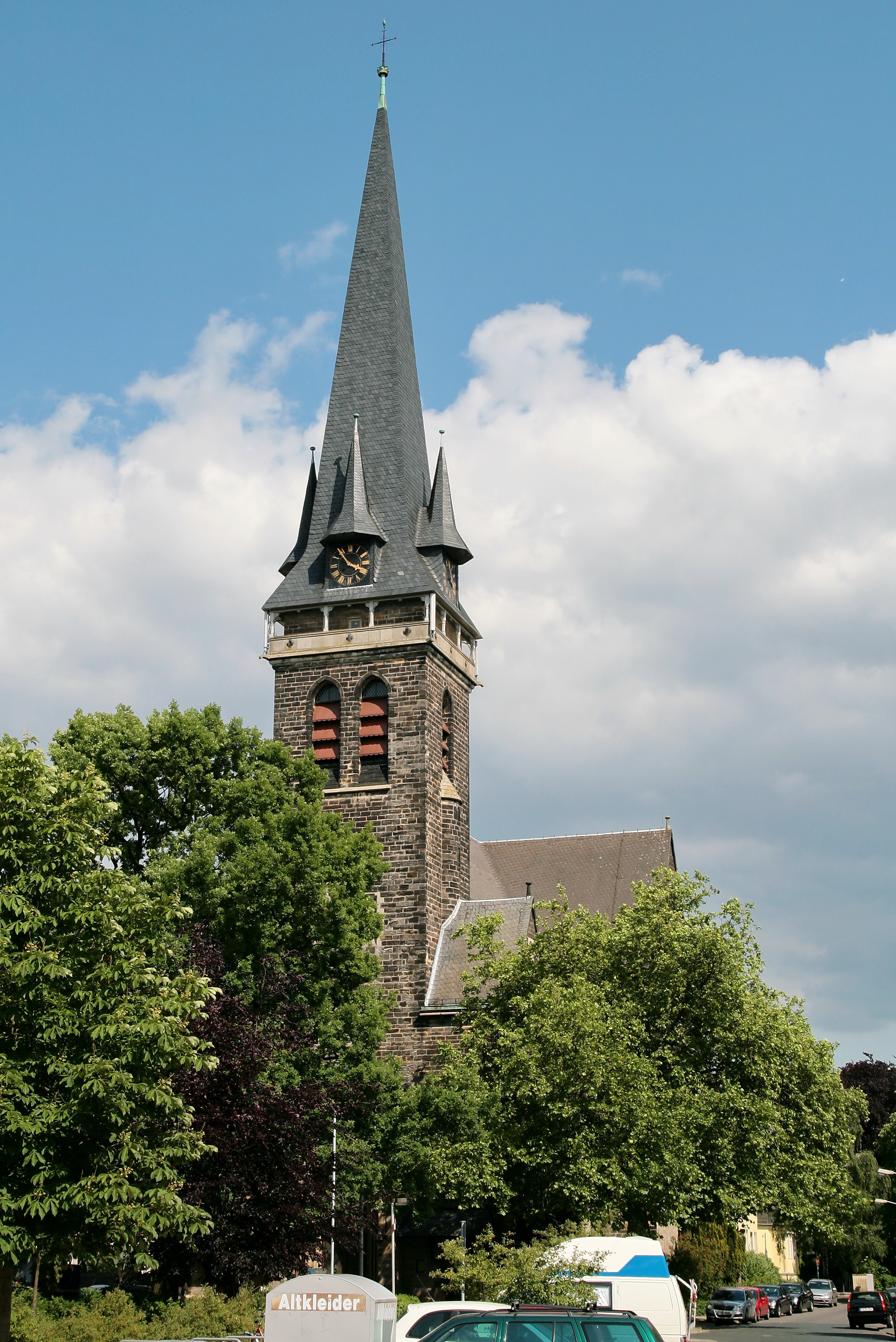
Herrenhäuser Kirche

Herrenhausen-Stöcken (German pronunciation: [ˈhɛʁənˌhaʊzn̩ ˈʃtœkn̩]; Eastphalian: Herrnhusen) is a borough of the German city of Hanover, northwest of the city centre. In 2020 it had a population of 37,543. It consists of the quarters Burg, Herrenhausen, Ledeburg, Leinhausen, Marienwerder, Nordhafen and Stöcken.

Industries include Johnson Controls (spun off from VARTA) and Herrenhäuser Brewery founded in 1868. Places of worship include the Herrenhäuser Kirche.

== Population development ==
Population development of Herrenhausen-Stöcken in Hannover, Germany

The graph shows the population development in the district of Herrenhausen-Stöcken since 1 January 2005.

== Palace and Gardens ==
A major attraction is the baroque Herrenhausen Palace and Herrenhausen Gardens, established by the House of Hanover.

The palace was largely destroyed in World War II and not rebuilt until 2013.

The 19th-century "Welfenmausoleum" in the Gardens is the burial place of Ernest Augustus, King of Hanover, and after World War II the remains of King George I of Great Britain along with his parents' were removed from the crypt of Leineschloss and reinterred there.

== See also ==
- House of Welf (Guelph)
