= Herrenhäuser Kirche =

Coordinates: 52°23′36″N 9°41′24″E

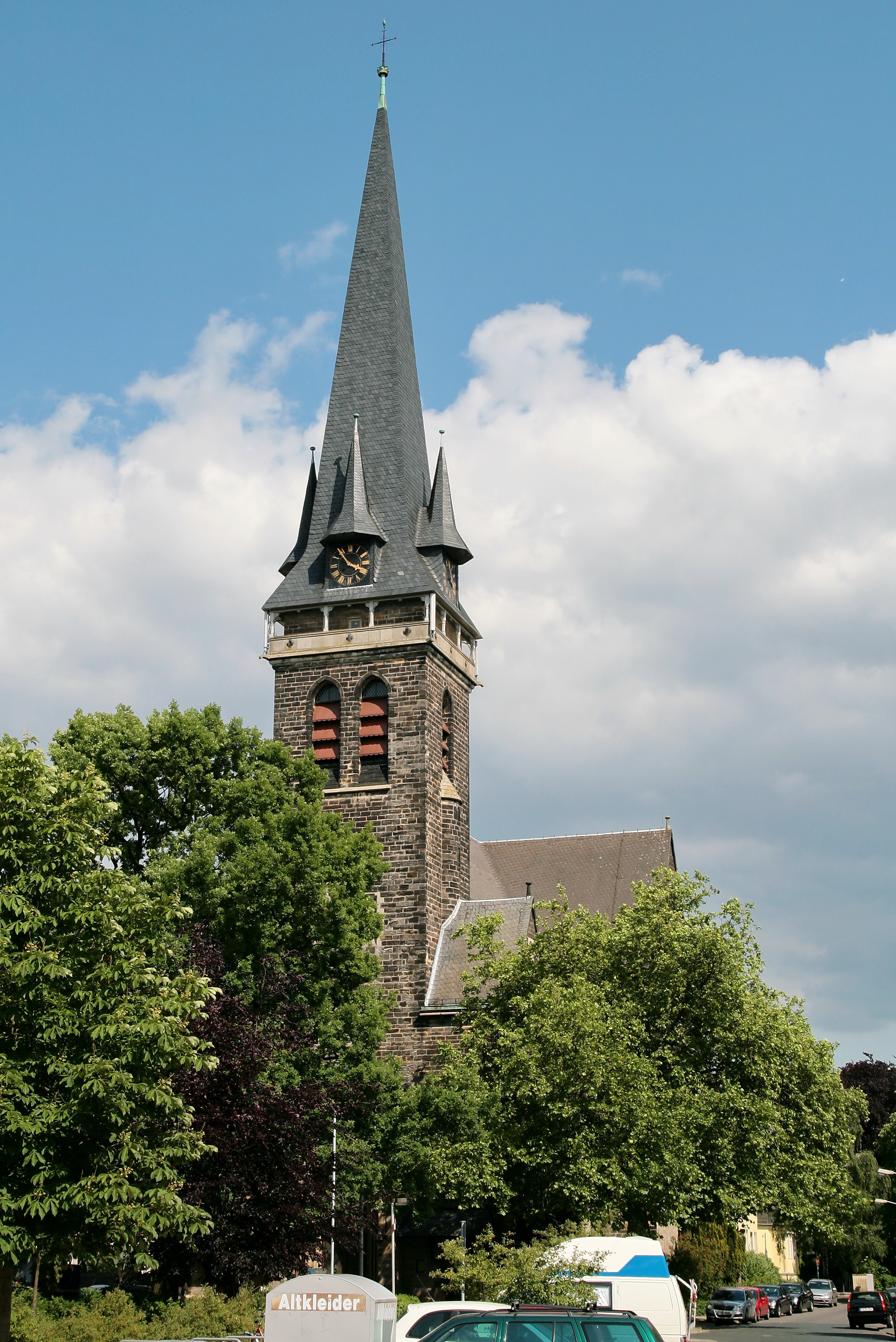
Herrenhäuser Kirche

The German: Herrenhäuser Kirche (Herrenhausen Church) in Hanover-Herrenhausen, Lower Saxony, Germany) is a church built in neo-Gothic style. Located close to the Herrenhausen Gardens, it belongs to the Lutheran congregation of the Herrenhausen-Leinhausen parish and is a listed historic building.

== History ==
Building started in 1904 and ended on 27 May 1906. It was made possible through the Jewish banker Moritz Simon, who encouraged the incorporated villagers of Herrenhausen to spend money which they had received from the capital city Hanover. The other half of the money was later received through donations and collections. The architect R. Eberhard Hillebrand, who was a student of Conrad Wilhelm Hase, decided on the church's Gothic Revival architectural style, for which he used sandstone. The church is 72 metres (236 ft) high and has a church spire with a four-sided pinnacle. The church shows a final point of an architectural idea – namely to shape a "Church of Words". If you look around inside of the church you will however see that fore, aft and transept show the same proportions. Therefore, the church is also a central building which follows the Greek cross.

During the Second World War the church was not destroyed but an aerial mine exploding closely shattered the glass of the windows. Today's colored altar window, designed by O. Brenneisen in 1946, shows Jesus and his disciples, which is the same motive the earlier window had. The glazing on the north and south side of the church interior is plain and uncolored. The sanctuary is dominated by a big window with a rose that is, besides of the centrally arranged pigeon (representing the Holy Spirit), designed with abstract new-age colored glass.

The church has three galleries and originally held seats for 930 people. In the 1960s the original picturing of the church, which was hold in art nouveau/natural motive, was overcoated with pedagogic white/grey and the central chandelier has been removed.

=== Restoration ===
One generation later the parish council decided together with the responsible department of the Evangelical-Lutheran Church of Hanover to restore the original arrangement. Installation of a glass wall led to the creation of an anteroom before the actual church interior underneath the organ loft. This led to the capacity of seats going down to 650 places. This restoration started in the 1980s and ended in the beginning of the 1990s with the installation of the new Chandelier.

== Portal ==
The Portal of the Herrenhäuser Kirche shows attributes of the Gothic style as the case may be neo-Gothic in case of the gable frame above the door (also called tympanum). In the four centered arch you can see on the front and on the inner side ribbon – like ornaments (Archivolt) that run left and right of the portal in each three pillars which mark the vestment of the Portal. The Wimperg above the Portal is decorated with three flowers inside and the top is furnished with a cross. Two turret tabernacles with pinnacles, finials and glare windows complete the portal composition. Above the cross of the pointed gable the observer sees a rosette molded as a quatrefoil. Even here in the entrance of the church the language of architecture wants to point out a mystery: Like in the Old Testament the pin hut was the place of revelation of God (the two tablets with the Ten Commandments were kept here), so should the New Testament community be reminded while receiving the communion, as well as during the whole church service, that God is present. While stepping inside the church the visitor crosses through three rooms and three doors, each symbols of the trinity: God – Father, God – Son, God – Holy Spirit. Before the visitor opens the glass door to the service room he sees a wooden ribbon on which is printed the Lord’s Prayer in gothic font over the whole length of the glass wall at height of the door knob (Draft: Reinhold Kniehl, sculptor and stonemason). The person who opens the door lays their hand on the following words of the Lord’s Prayer: "And forgive us our debts, as we also have forgiven our debtors." (Matthew 6, 12)

== Interior ==
=== Chandelier ===
The big Chandelier controls the interior room of the church. A man from Saxony manufactured the chandelier in the 1990s. He did it after old drafts but developed it with new age form perception. Models of the Chandelier can be found for example in the Hildesheimer and the Aachener cathedral. Twelve gateways maimed with battlements, six towers and six houses decorate the polished brass rim (the twelve houses of Israel and the twelve apostles). It symbolizes the new Jerusalem, which is described in the Revelation of John 21, 10ff. John sees the new Jerusalem floating down from the sky. This is the way the Chandelier wants to be considered: It floats between the church dome and the ground on which we are standing. The new Jerusalem (= paradise on earth) is promised but not tangible yet.

=== Roundel ===
Three big roundels, three galleries, each carried by three round arches, surround the central room of the church and point out the trinity. Beneath the galleries are traced ashlars rocks with several sun symbols. All three Roundels show an eight division and want to point us atop of our reality towards god. Even in mathematics the lying eight is a symbol for infinity.

=== Prayer corner ===
Beneath the right side gallery there is a simple but appealing Prayer Corner. It was built on the occasion of the EXPO 2000 in Hanover and was designed by Prof. Schwerdtfeger. Whoever lights a commemorative candle can see how it is reflected by the surrounding glass wall. The impression of great depth, in which the candle lights into is given.

=== Way of the Cross ===
In the Passiontide the Way of the Cross is shown with sixteen stations beneath the two side galleries. The one from the Herrenhäuser Kirche was painted by Robert Hammerstiel in strong red colors. The soldiers are wearing uniforms of the Second World War like the ones used in the Balkan. Hammerstiel witnessed this as a growing child. The color red symbolizes the blood, the life and the passion. With passion the soldiers hit, tortured and nailed Jesus to the cross and with passion Jesus fought for the freedom and the dignity of the people.

== Sanctuary ==
=== Altar ===
The Altar of the Herrenhäuser Kirche shows a special architectural feature. Resting upon five pillars is the supper table and underneath a block-altar. The altar reminds of the old sacrificial table where animal sacrifices were made. The table form of the altar shows a direct line to the table of the last supper from Jesus and his disciples. Here at the altar bread and wine is given which should remind the Christians that Jesus Christ gave his life for our salvation. In bread and wine we find the elements of the earth that we need to live. We hear the investiture words, which interpret the Last Supper, which are words of salvation for the people.

=== Altar window ===
The Altar Window from O. Brenneisen (1949) shows Jesus and two of his disciples. Predominantly in the summer time during the time of the church service the sun touches the face of Jesus and lets the golden-yellow aureole and the barely visible red cross around his head light up. The travelling light then reaches the two disciples. The lower altar area is edged with a red royal coat which is interrupted through four green spaces around the altar window. This reminds of the crucifixion of Jesus. Green stands for new life and for the hope of resurrection. Six angels, next to and above the altar window, point out that Jesus was accompanied by angels from his birth to his death and his resurrection. Angels are a symbol for the mysterious talks of god to the people. The altar window is surrounded by painted floral patterns and so is the pointed gable.

=== Crucifix ===
The Crucifix above the altar is originally from a Lutheran church in Einbeck but since 1992 it has its place in the sanctuary. The crown of thorns and the wraparound garment are covered with gold. Gold is the "color" of the sky and of the justice. God laid his hand on this Jesus, on this righteous person. At the same time the transition from life to death and to eternal life is shown – ultimately this procedure is a secret of god.

=== Quire arch ===
The quire arch represents the heavenly Jerusalem. Two trees are growing from the heavenly city Jerusalem which established deep rests upon twelve fundaments: 1. The tree of life; 2. The tree of acknowledgment of good and bad.

=== Pulpit ===
The Pulpit is the place from which the word of god is preached into the church interior and the whole wide world to arouse, to promote and to consolidate the faith. Above the abat-voix the observer sees twelve open windows in gothic style which remind of the twelve apostle of Jesus who are already in the heavenly Jerusalem and who not only watch the worshipper dominical but also are praying for them.

=== Baptismal font ===
The baptismal font rests upon six pillars which like the pillars of the altar are covered in gold. Among themselves they are connected with the trefoil elements (the trinity carries and interlaces the christening).
