= La Cumbrecita =

- Hamlet
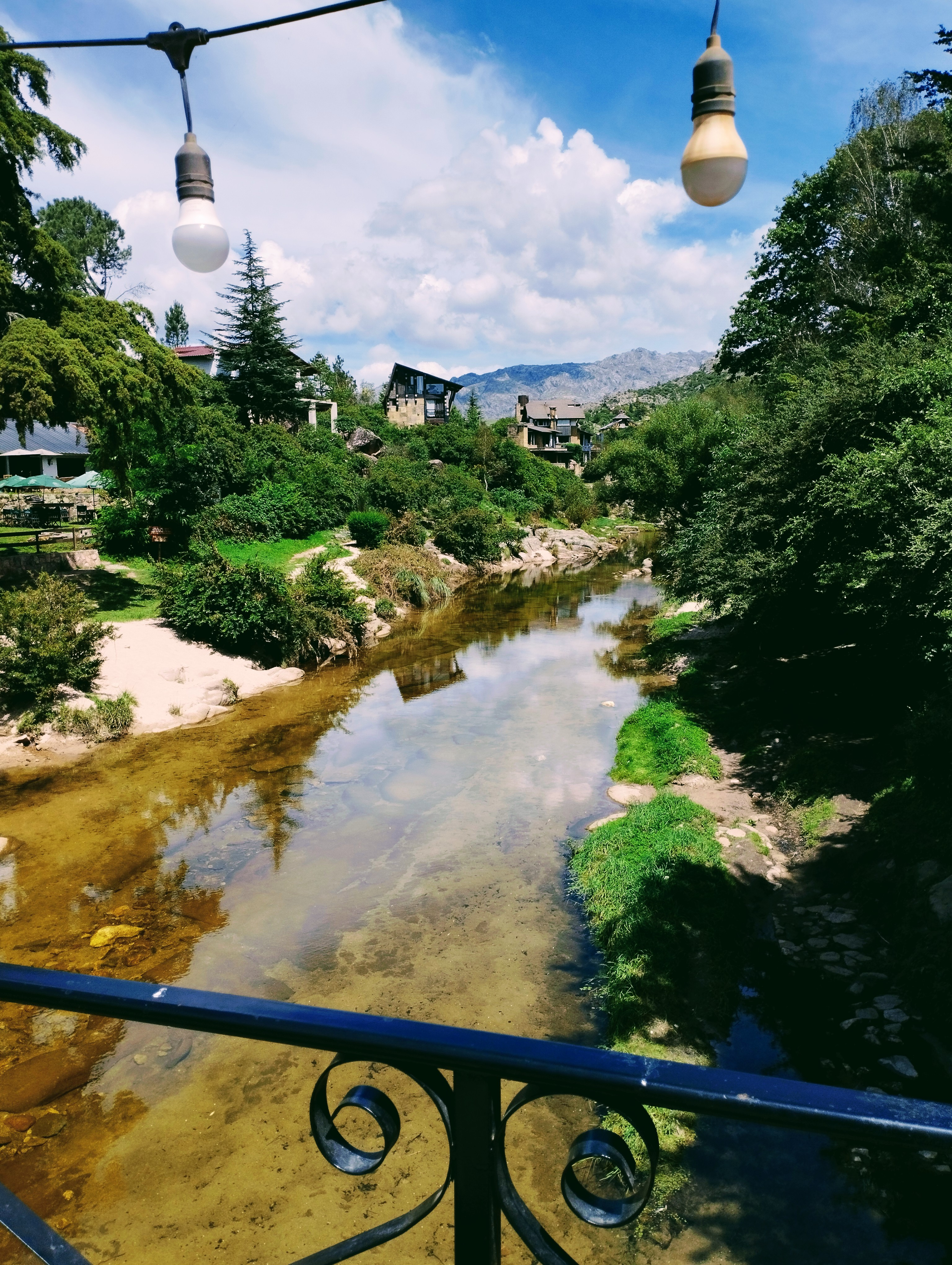

- Location of La Cumbrecita in Argentina
- Coordinates: 31°53.90′S 64°46.40′W
- Country: Argentina
- Province: Córdoba
- Department: Santa María
- Elevation: 1,450 m (4,760 ft)

Population
  - Total: 189
- Time zone: UTC−3 (ART)
- CPA base: X5194
- Dialing code: +54 03546

La Cumbrecita is a small hamlet 1,450 metres (4,757 ft) above sea level in the Calamuchita Valley in the Grand Sierras of Córdoba, Argentina. A 30 kilometres (19 mi) paved road through the Sierra Grandes connects to it from the main road to the provincial capital.

There is a river called Medio that borders La Cumbrecita and it is the edge of Santa María Department. The town receives roughly 300,000 tourists annually.

== Geography ==
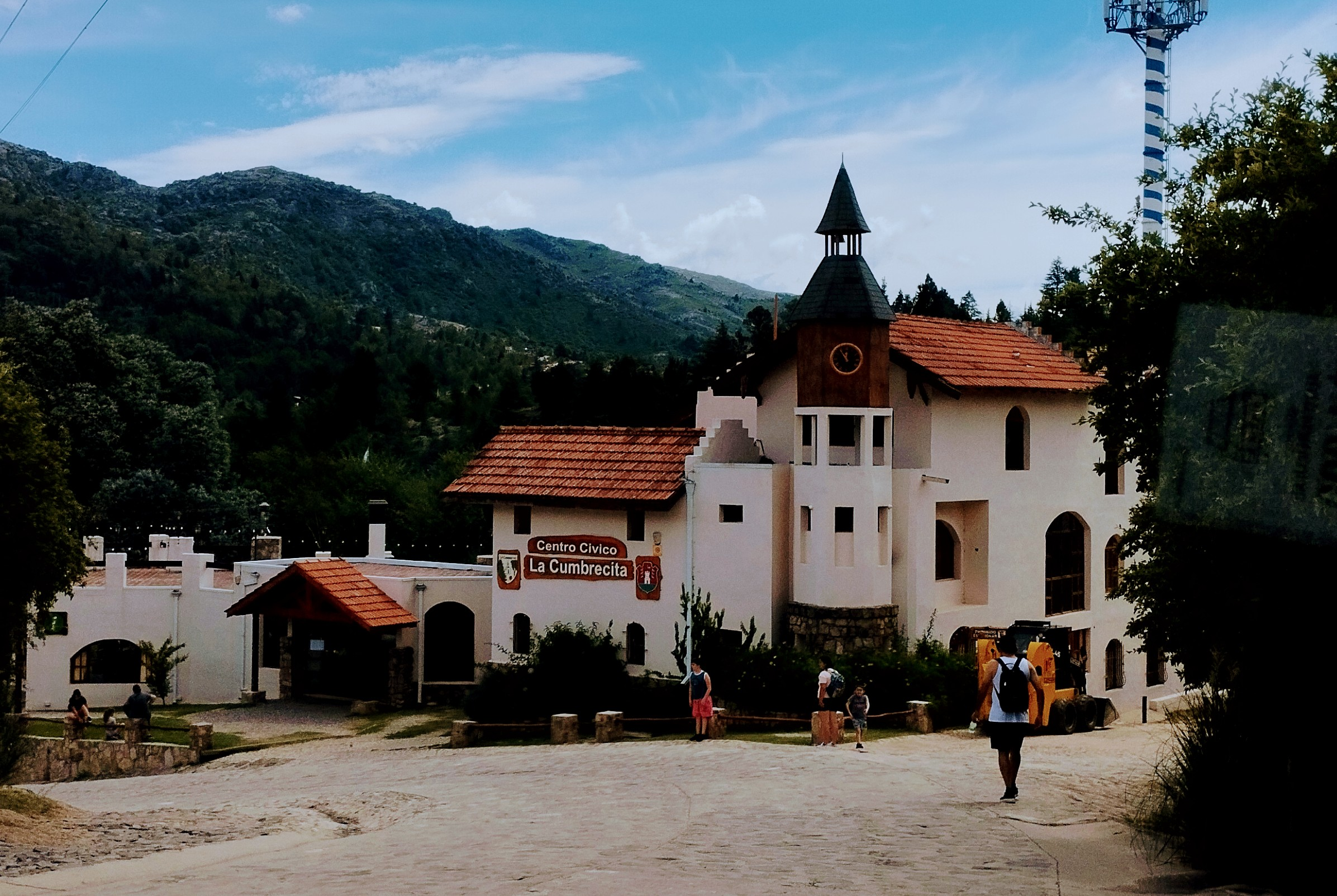
Entrance in La Cumbrecita

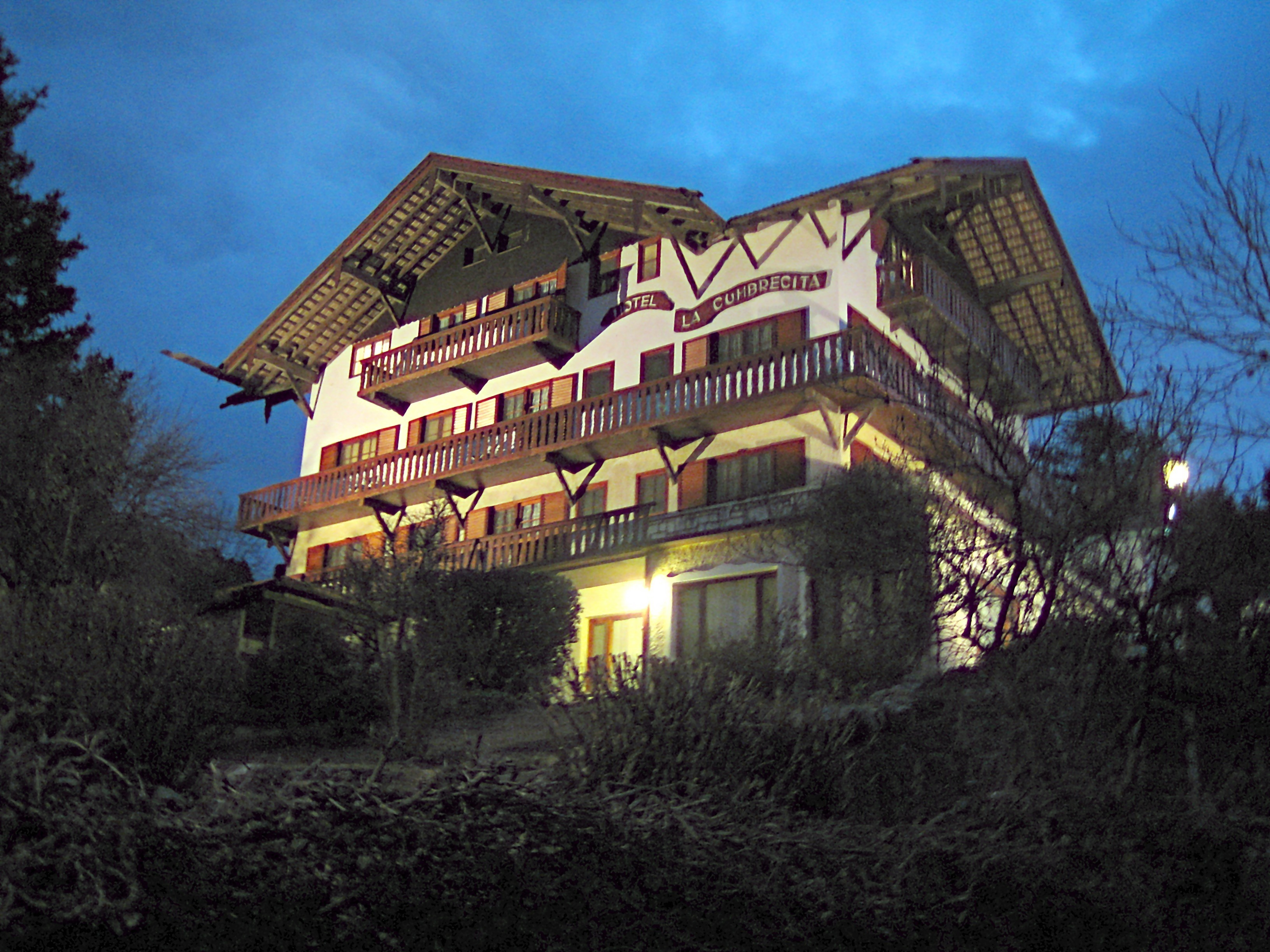
Hotel in La Cumbrecita

La Cumbrecita is about 40 kilometres (25 mi) to the west of Villa General Belgrano and 118 kilometres (73 mi) from the capital city of Córdoba. Excursions to La Cumbrecita can be taken from nearby Villa General Belgrano, founded by the crew of the German cruiser Admiral Graf Spee.

The town is organized as a commune. It was founded on 9 September 1934, when the Cabjolsky family bought 500 hectares (2 sq mi) of land, and brothers Enrique and Federico Behrend started their pioneer work. The residents planted pine trees and transformed the countryside into an Alpine environment. Local residents made the road to Los Reartes and constructed the first houses.

== Tourism ==
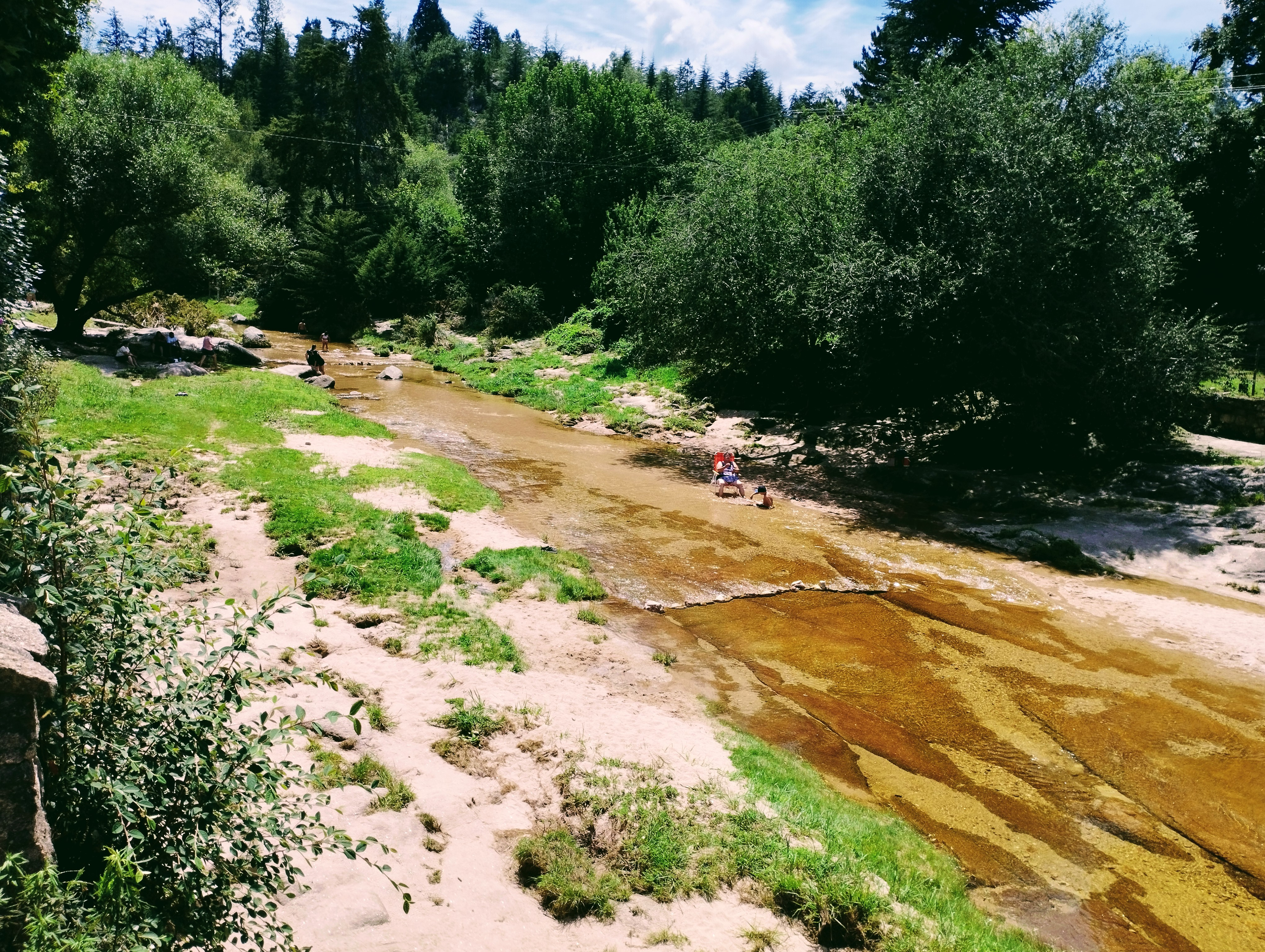
River in La Cumbrecita

The land that would become the town was purchased in 1934 by a group of German immigrants who moved from Berlin in Germany to Argentina. The buyers began constructing Swiss-German themed homes on the land and selling it to their friends in Germany and Austria. In 1938, the town's streets were laid out.

Populated by central European immigrants, the town is focused on eco-tourism and is designed completely for pedestrians, the only such town in Argentina. This town offers a range of hotels, lodges, and cabins that are decorated in an alpine style. There is a museum in the town that is dedicated to minerals that have been found in the area.

The communal authorities declared the zone a protected environment and as of 1996 a "Pedestrian Town". Visitors must park their cars in the parking lot before entering the town.

== Population ==
According to the INDEC 2001 census, there were 189 people living in La Cumbrecita and 156 in Calamuchita, which makes for a total of 345 people. In La Cumbrecita, there are 140 households that are counted. In each county, there are 97 and 43 people.

== See also ==
- Villa General Belgrano
- List of largest cuckoo clocks
