= Villa General Belgrano =

- Village
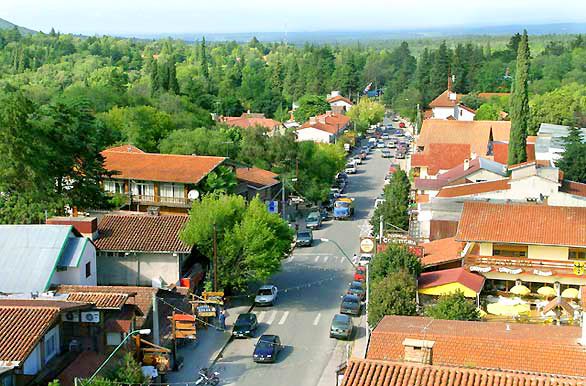
- Aerial view of Villa General Belgrano

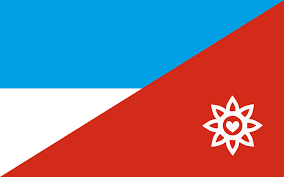
- Flag

- Location of the village in Argentina
- Coordinates: 31°58′S 64°34′W
- Country: Argentina
- Province: Córdoba
- Department: Calamuchita

Government
  - Intendant: Oscar Santarelli (PJ)
- Elevation: 709 m (2,326 ft)

Population
  - Total: 8,257
- Demonym: Belgranense
- Time zone: UTC−3 (ART)
- CPA base: X5194
- Dialing code: +54 3546

Villa General Belgrano is a mountain village in the valley of Calamuchita in the Province of Córdoba in central Argentina. As of 2010 it had 8,257 inhabitants. The settlement is named after Manuel Belgrano, the Argentine independence hero and designer of the Argentine flag.

== History ==
Villa General Belgrano was founded in 1930, by two German speculators attracted to the valley by its agricultural potential. The Alpine quality of the village attracted immigrants from Germany, Switzerland, Italy and Austria.

In 1940, after the Battle of the River Plate, German sailors scuttled their 'pocket battleship', the German cruiser Admiral Graf Spee off the coast of the Montevideo harbour, and 130 of its surviving crew settled in the village along with the original settlers, and landscaped the mountain ranges of Córdoba with red-roofed, wood-frame homes, microbreweries and pastry and chocolate shops that gave the unique style that distinguishes the town today. A well-known German resident was Kurt Tank, who became a leading member of the Argentine Aeronautic Institute.

The village, characterized by its typically Bavarian style architecture, survives on a steady flow of tourists with an appetite for German delicacies like Apfelstrudel, Leberwurst and Spätzle and beer even if German cuisine recipes are not strictly respected by local restaurants. Oktoberfest here is hailed as the third-most important Oktoberfest site after Munich and Blumenau in Brazil. The village offers an above-average (considering surrounding villages) quality of accommodations to the visitors in hotels and cabins, including a local Howard Johnson's.

Newsstands sell the German language weekly, Argentinisches Tageblatt among other German newspapers, and the church offers Sunday services in German and Spanish. Like many isolated immigrant communities, Villa General Belgrano has respected traditions that fell out of favor in Germany long ago, however even though the mother tongue can still be heard, it is being lost in time.

== Culture ==
Villa General Belgrano maintains strong Bavarian cultural traditions, reflected in its architecture, cuisine, and community events. Many local customs introduced by German immigrants have been preserved, including the celebration of traditional festivals and the use of the German language in some local services and newspapers.

=== Oktoberfest ===
The village hosts one of the most important Oktoberfest celebrations in the Southern Hemisphere. Modeled after the traditional German festival, it attracts thousands of visitors every year with German-style beer, music, dances, and cuisine. The event highlights the village's Bavarian heritage and is considered the third most significant Oktoberfest celebration worldwide, after Munich, Germany, and Blumenau, Brazil.

== Flora and fauna ==
The flora in this area has many arboreal autochthonous species as the chañar, espinillio, molle, moradillo, shade of bull and piquillín amongst other. As for the species implemented by the man in the zone important plantations of coniferous, eucalyptuses, paradise, acacias, are found. As for the fauna, gray foxes, partridges, vizcachas, cuises, shy iguanas, weasels, etc. are abundant. The commune is in the region named Bosque Serrano, located between 500 and 1400 metres above sea level.

== Nearby towns ==
The nearby town of Santa Rosa de Calamuchita, together with Villa General Belgrano are the principal tourist localities of the Valley. Nearby there also are the small settlements of Los Reartes, Villa Ciudad Parque Los Reartes, Solar de los Molinos, Villa Berna, Villa Alpina, Capilla Vieja, Atos Pampa, and La Cumbrecita which are singular tourist attractions.

== Education ==
The area once had a German school, Colegio Aleman "Steck".

== Gallery ==
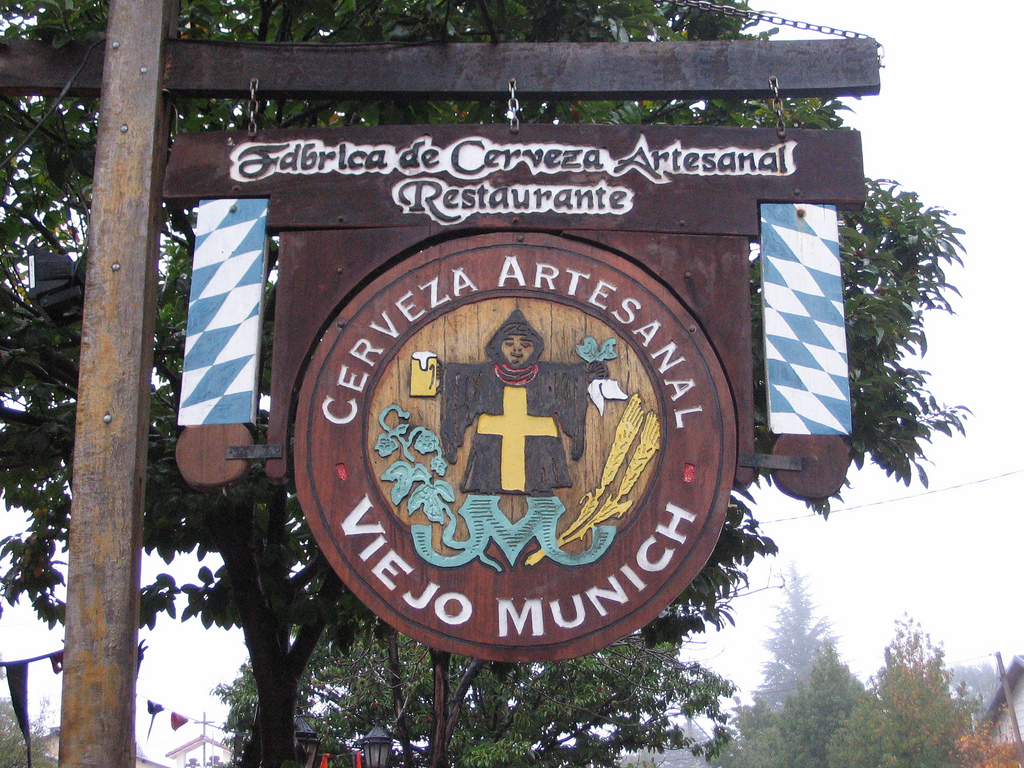
Typical wooden signage

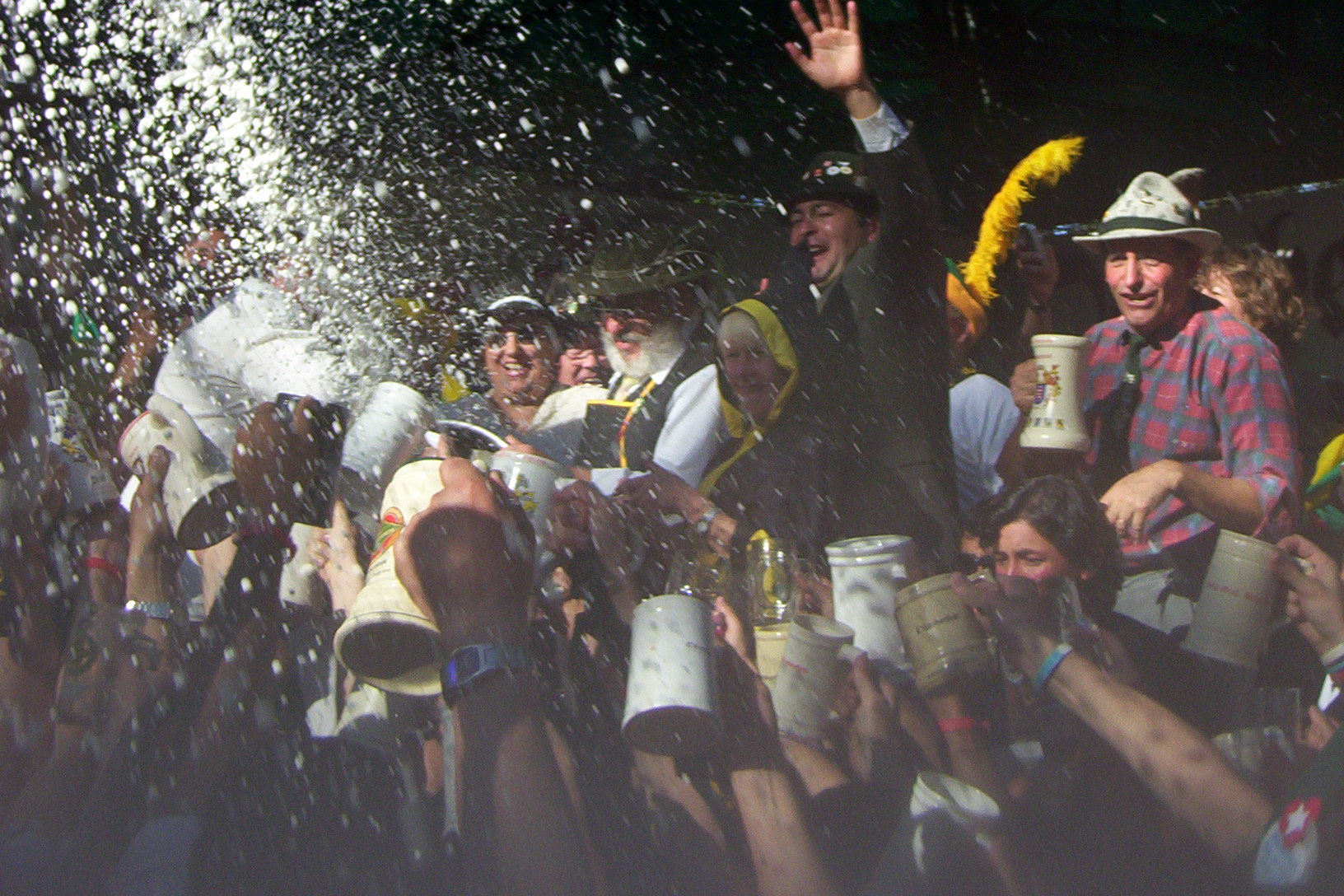
Colonia General Belgrano is the Oktoberfest Capital of Argentina, the largest celebration of its kind.

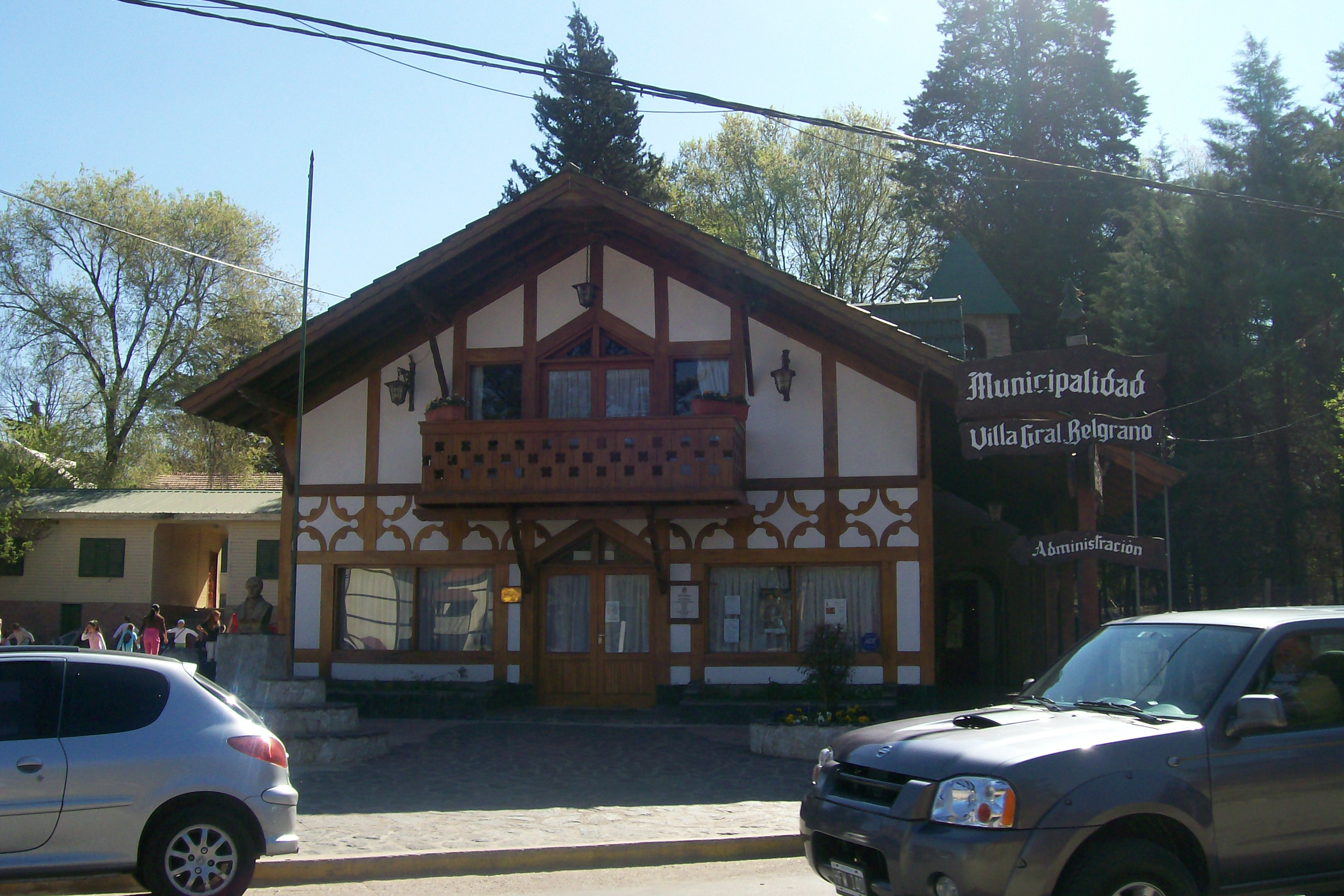
Town-Hall building, of the Municipality of Villa General Belgrano

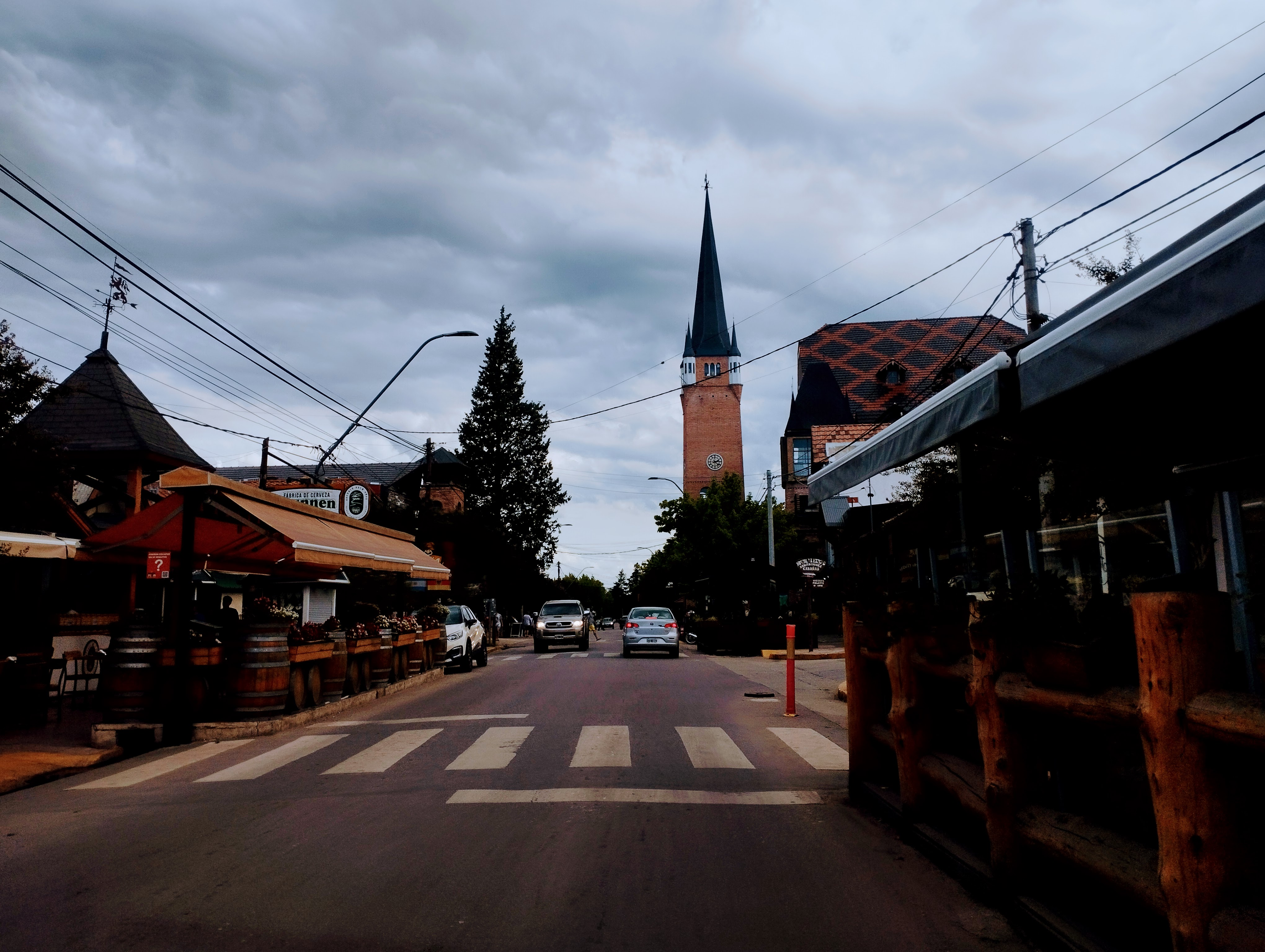
Street in Villa General Belgrano

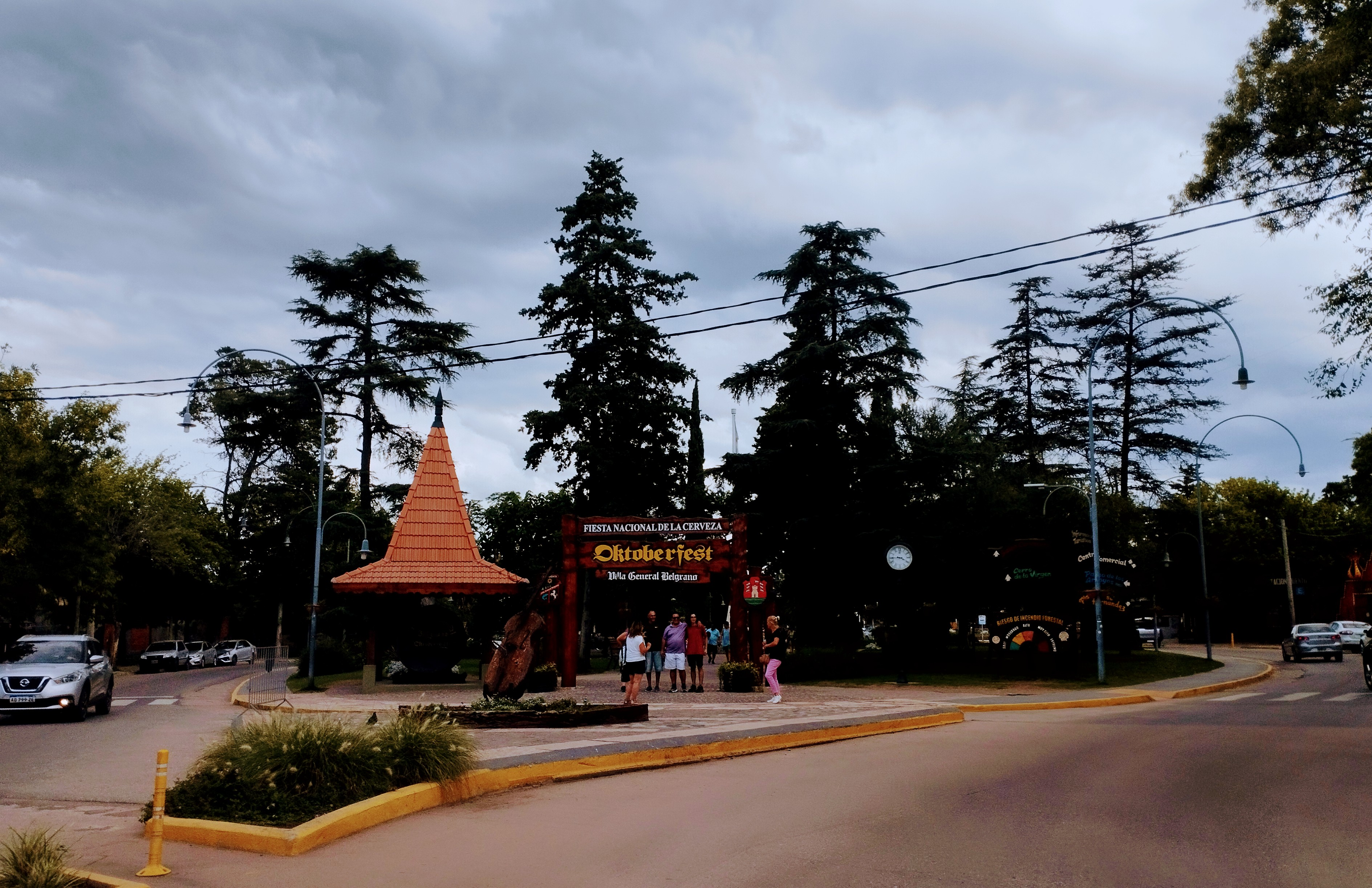
Park in Villa General Belgrano

== See also ==
- La Cumbrecita
- Manuel Belgrano
