= Herrenhäuser Brewery =

Brewery in Hannover, Germany

Privatbrauerei Herrenhausen GmbH
- Interactive map of Privatbrauerei Herrenhausen GmbH
- Type: GmbH
- Location: Hannover-Herrenhausen, Lower Saxony, Germany
- Coordinates: 52°23′39″N 9°40′52″E
- Opened: 1868
- Key people: Axel Schulz-Hausbrandt, Christian Schulz-Hausbrandt
- Website: herrenhaeuser.de

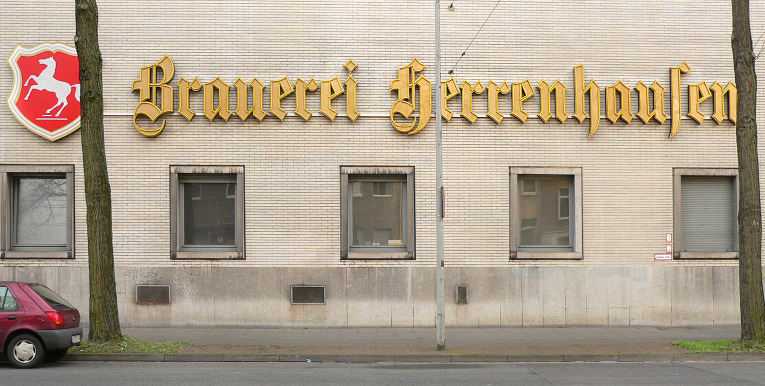

The Herrenhäuser Brewery (Herrenhäuser Brauerei) was founded in 1868 in the Herrenhausen district of Hannover, Germany. There are number of breweries in Hannover, e.g. Gilde brewery was founded about 300 years earlier.

== History ==
Herrenhäuser introduced the first kosher pilsener beer to the European market called Herrenhäuser Kosher.

=== Origins ===
The company was originally established under the name Brauerei Wölfler & Wedekind Herrenhausen.
