= Germania Park =

Coordinates: 40.895924°N 74.542531°W

Germania Park or the "Deutscher Schul- und Gesangverein (DSGV)", the German School and Singing Society, is a German-American cultural club that was established in 1895. The purpose of the club is to foster, promote and perpetuate German language, German song, culture, customs and traditions.

Germania Park is located in Rockaway Township, New Jersey.

The park hosts "Oktoberfest" events in both June and September, which are a highlight for the community. They feature German, Austrian and German-American bands. German beer is also sold here, such as Spaten.

== History of Germania Park ==
- 1895: Germania Park Founded
- 1907: German Language School Opened
- 1916: Changed name to e "Deutscher Schulverein Dover".
- 1925: Land purchased in Rockaway Township, New Jersey from the Berry Farm Estate
