= Oktoberfest of Blumenau =

Annual festival in Blumenau, Brazil

Coordinates: 26°54′55.68″S 49°5′2.54″W

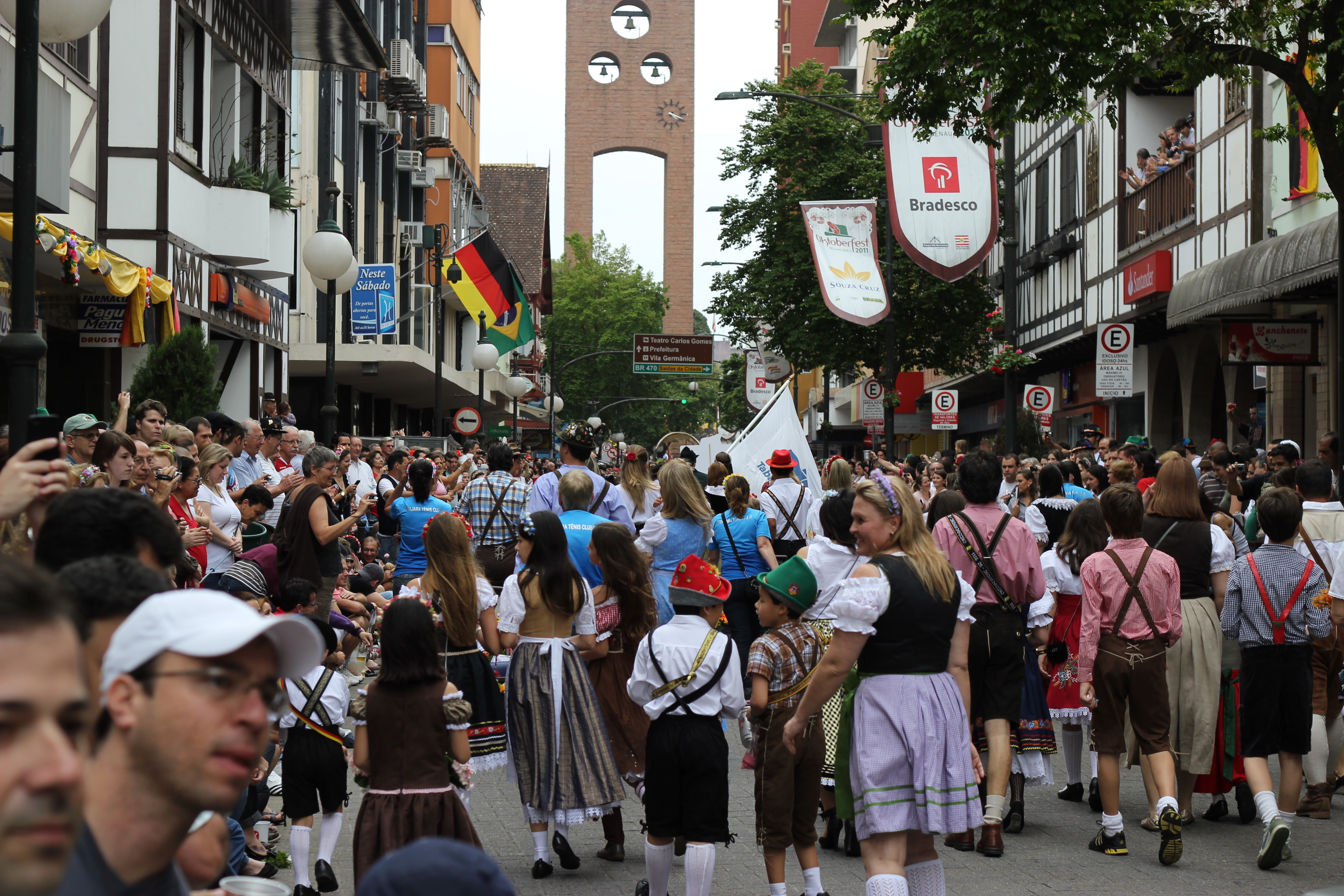
Oktoberfest of Blumenau

The Oktoberfest of Blumenau is a festival of German traditions that happens in middle October in the city of Blumenau, Santa Catarina, Brazil. It is considered the second biggest German festival in the Americas, and the third biggest Oktoberfest celebration in the world after the original Oktoberfest from Munich.

It takes place at Parque Vila Germânica (Germanic Village Park), located in the Bairro da Velha (District of the Old Woman), and lasts for 18 days.

== History ==
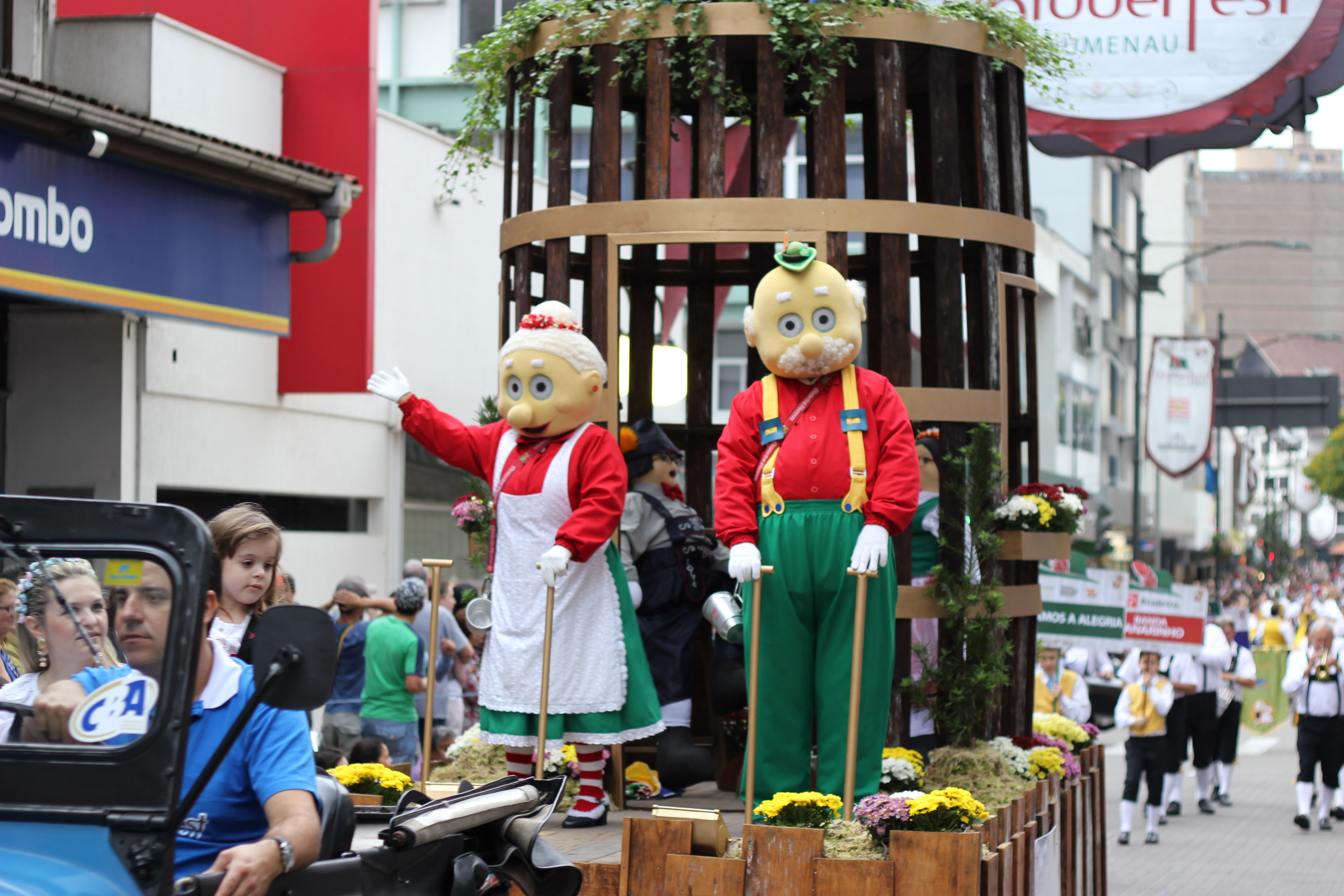
Grandpa and Grandma Chopão on a float at a parade during the Oktoberfest

The Oktoberfest of Blumenau was created in 1984, after a big flood of the Itajaí-Açu river, with the objective of recuperating the city's economy and raising the morale of its inhabitants. Even before that, owners of industries and commercial buildings in the city were already planning to start a festival like the original from Munich, but the flood was an important event that set the festival in motion. Since its first edition it has been a success, and today it has an attendance of about than 700,000/year. The event features folk dance (Tanzgruppen), shooting matches (Schützenvereine), German singing, folk costume and German cuisine. "Fritz" and "Frida" are the typical German characters. The "Vovó e Vovô Chopão" (Grandma and Grandpa Chopão, "Big Beer") are the official symbolic characters of the event.

In August 2020, officials cited the COVID-19 pandemic as grounds to push back the dates to November. But by early October, they decided to go on hiatus until 2022. The festival returned in October 2022.

== Queen of the Oktoberfest ==
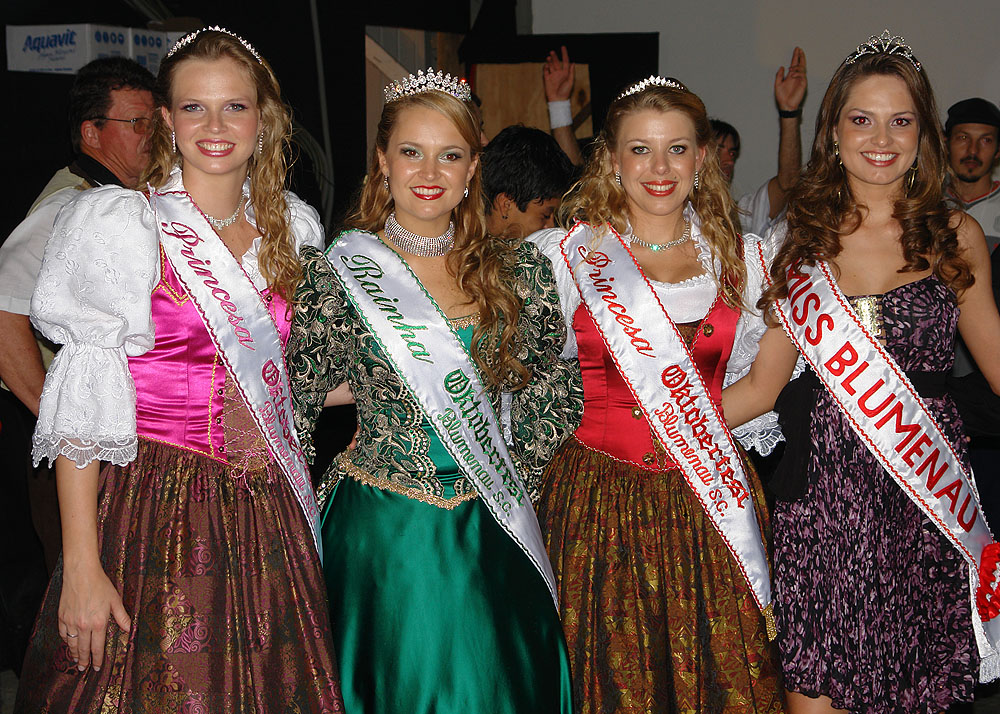
Queen and Princesses of Oktoberfest and Miss Blumenau

A Queen of Oktoberfest is chosen every year. There are ten candidates, who must compete wearing costumes in the categories of posture, resourcefulness on the catwalk, communication skills, beauty, and friendliness. If there are more than ten candidates, there is a pre-selection. The first three are classified; the first place is elected as the Queen of Oktoberfest, followed by the first and second Princess of Oktoberfest.

== National Competition of Tap beer in Meter Drinkers ==
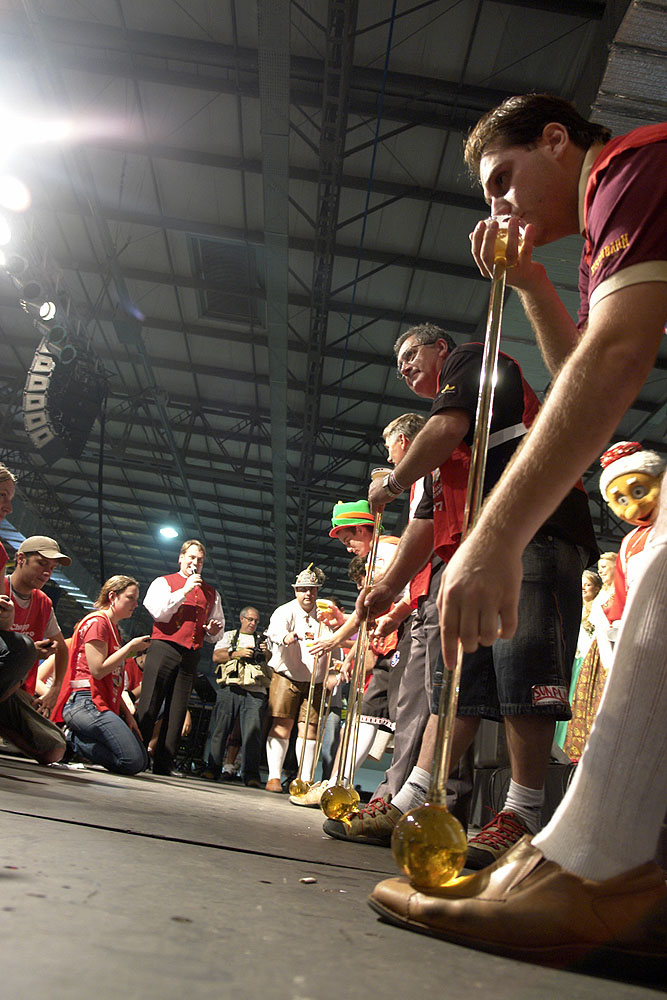
Contestants preparing for the National Competition of Tap beer in Meter Drinkers during the Oktoberfest in Blumenau

The National Competition of Tap beer in Meter Drinkers is a competition that takes place during the event. By its rules, the competitor has to drink one meter of beer (600ml tulip) without drooling or taking the tulip off the mouth, the winner being whoever drinks in the least amount of time. Each night of the competition there is a winner, and at the end of the event it is known who has the fastest time on all days of competition in the two suits, male and female.
