= Regalia (ship) =

Several vessels have been named Regalia for regalia:

- Regalia (1811 ship) was launched at Sunderland. In 1819 she made a voyage to Calcutta. she also sailed to New South Wales and Van Diemen's Land. From Sydney she engaged in several sealing hunting voyages to the waters around Macquarie Island. In 1826 she transported convicts from Dublin to New South Wales. From 1831 until 1852, when she was wrecked at Davis Strait, Regalia was a whaler in the northern whale fishery.
- Regalia (1813 ship) was launched at Whitby. She made two voyages to Quebec, carrying immigrants in 1831. she was last listed in 1850.
- Regalia (1828 ship) as launched in Sunderland. She foundered off Southport in November 1831.
