= Robert Quayle (1814 ship) =

UK merchant ship and whaler (1814–1838)

History

United Kingdom
- Name: Robert Quayle
- Namesake: Grandfather of Robert Quayle Kermode (Note: In 1810 William Kermode married Anne Quayle, daughter of Robert Quayle. In 1812 they had a son, Robert Quayle Kermode.)
- Launched: 1814, Liverpool
- Fate: Wrecked 1 December 1838

General characteristics
- Tons burthen: 356 (bm)
- Sail plan: Snow; later barque

Robert Quayle (or Robert Quail) was launched at Liverpool in 1814. Between 1816 and 1819 she made several voyages to India, sailing under a licence from the British East India Company (EIC). Between 1819 and 1821 she made one voyage with cargo to New South Wales, and then remained to engage in whaling. After her return to Britain she traded to South and North America. She was wrecked in December 1838 while engaged in the timber trade with Canada.

== Career ==
Robert Quayle first appeared in the Register of Shipping (RS) in 1814 as Robert Quagh.

| Year | Master | Owner | Trade | Source |
|---|---|---|---|---|
| 1814 | P.Jackson | Davidson | Liverpool–Jamaica | RS |

Missing pages in the 1814 volume of Lloyd's Register (LR) mean that Robert Quale first appeared in Lloyd's Register in the volume for 1815.

| Year | Master | Owner | Trade | Source |
|---|---|---|---|---|
| 1815 | P.Jackson; E.Oldham | Davidson | Liverpool–Madeira | LR |
| 1818 | E.Oldham; R.Parker | Kermode & Co. | Liverpool–Calcutta | LR |

In 1813 the EIC had lost its monopoly on the trade between India and Britain. British ships were then free to sail to India or the Indian Ocean under a licence from the EIC.

An advertisement in the Liverpool Mercury of 29 November 1816 stated that Robert Quayle, of 356 tons, Roger P. Jones, master, intended to sail in December for Calcutta. As it was, she sailed on 11 February 1817.

On 21 July 1817 Robert Quayle, Jones, master, arrived at Bengal. On 4 February 1818, Robert Quayle, Jones, master, arrived at the Cape of Good Hope from Bengal; she had sailed from Bengal on 17 November 1817. She sailed for London on 14 February. On 3 May she was at Castletown, Isle of Man. On 11 May she arrived back at Liverpool. She was carrying a cargo of cotton.

On 28 June 1818, Captain D.K.Brown sailed for Fort William, India. On 5 July she was at Gibraltar. On 27 November she sailed from Bombay, homeward bound. By 17 February 1819 she was at St Helena. By 19 April she was back at Liverpool.

| Year | Master | Owner | Trade | Source |
|---|---|---|---|---|
| 1819 | E.Oldham; R.Parker; D.Brown | Kermode & Co. | Liverpool–Calcutta; Liverpool–New South Wales | LR |

Robert Quayle, James Leslie, master, sailed for New South Wales on 5 July 1819. She arrived at the Cape on 25 September and sailed again on 30 September. She arrived at Hobart Town on 11 November. William Kermode sailed to New South Wales on Robert Quayle as supercargo. (Note: Earlier he may have made several voyages to India, possibly as a supercargo.) (Note: William Kermode had been born on the Isle of Man in 1780. He had been a captain to two slave ships: Baron Montalembert (1801–1802), and Nicholson (1806–1808).)

On 21 November Robert Quayle sailed to Sydney; she arrived on 28 November. Kermode had selling his cargo so left it in the hands of agents. He sent Robert Quayle to the whale fishery and returned to England in Admiral Cockburn, which sailed for England on 1 March 1820. That same day Robert Quayle, Leslie, master, sailed for the whale fishery.

On 10 May Robert Quayle came into Hobart. She had been to the coast of New Zealand and Norfolk Island, but had not killed a single whale. She then went whaling in the River Derwent where she succeeded in getting two or four whales. She reportedly agreed to tranship oil from Active, which was a full ship.

On 10 August Robert Quayle returned to Hobart from the whale fishery. In September Robert Quayle sailed for Macquarie Island. On 8 September, before she sailed, three convicts attempting to escape the colony, were discovered aboard. The constables took them to gaol.

On 13 November Robert Quayle sailed for London from Macquarie Island with 150 tons of elephant seal oil. (Note: Regalia was there at the same time and gathered 260 tons of elephant seal oil.) This, together with the other cargo already on her, made her a "full ship". She was at St Helena on 20 January 1821. On 21 February 1821 she spoke Cyrus, Hale, master. Robert Quayle was 104 days out of Van Diemen's Land. (Note: The coordinates in the report, 20°31′S 42°45′W, would put the encounter within Brazil. Reversing longitude and latitude to 42°45′S 20°31′W would put the location of the encounter within the South Atlantic.) Robert Quayle arrived back at London on 24 March.

Robert Quayle brought with her, including the cargo transshipped for Active, 1000 casks sperm oil, 55 tons whale oil, four tons spermaceti, 5 cwt whale fins, 66 tons whale oil, six tons spermaceti and headmatter, 116 cwt whale fins, two casks seal skins, 1200 kangaroo skins, 145 tons sea elephant oil, and three sea elephant skins.

| Year | Master | Owner | Trade | Source & notes |
|---|---|---|---|---|
| 1821 | D.Browne; Roper | Kermode & Co. | Liverpool–New South Wales; Liverpool–Pernambuco | LR |
| 1822 | P.Roper | Leigh & Co. | Liverpool–Pernambuco; Liverpool–Savannah | LR |
| 1826 | P.Roper | Leigh & Co. | Liverpool–New Brunswick | LR; new wales and good repair 1826 |

Actually, Robert Quayle had already returned to Liverpool from New Brunswick in May 1822 with pine logs, lathwood, deals, and four masts. A year later she arrived from Savannah with cotton. Six months later she again arrived from New Brunswick with wood.

In April 1824 Robert Quaill was reported in Alexandria, Egypt.

On 22 September 1826 Robert Quayle, Roper, master, sailed from Liverpool for Mauritius, which she reached on 22 December. The next year she was again at Mauritius, having sailed from Marseilles. She then sailed to the United States, returning to Liverpool in July 1830 with cotton.

| Year | Master | Owner | Trade | Source & notes |
|---|---|---|---|---|
| 1830 | P.Roper; J.Nichols | Leigh & Co. | Liverpool–New Brunswick | LR; new wales and good repair 1826 |
| 1831 | J.Nichols | Nichol & Co. | Liverpool–Bahia | LR; new wales and good repair 1826, and new deck 1830 |
| 1832 | J.Nichols; Bleasdale | Nichol & Co. | Liverpool–Bahia | LR; new wales and good repair 1826, and new deck 1830 |

Robert Quayle brought hides, horns, cotton, grass, coffee, tapioca, sugar, and planks of rosewood back to Liverpool from Bahia. In 1832–1833, Robert Quayle, Nickels, master, sailed to Bombay.

| Year | Master | Owner | Trade | Source & notes |
|---|---|---|---|---|
| 1833 | Bleasdale | Nichol & Co. | Liverpool–Bombay | LR; new wales and good repair 1826, and new deck 1830 |

The EIC ceased its trading activities in 1833 and all British vessels were then free to sail between Britain and the Far East without a license. In addition to sailing to Bombay, Robert Quayle, Bleasdale, master, in 1835 sailed to Bassadore and Bassora in the Persian Gulf.

| Year | Master | Owner | Trade | Source & notes |
|---|---|---|---|---|
| 1836 | Bleasdale; J.Anna (or Hannay) | Nichol & Co. | London–Bombay; Liverpool–Sierra Leone | LR; new deck 1832 & some repairs 1836 |
| 1838 | J.Corner | Corner & Co. | Newport–Quebec | LR; new deck 1832 & some repairs 1836 & 1837 |

== Fate ==
On 11 May 1838 Robert Quayle arrived at Quebec. Robert Quail was wrecked on 1 December 1838 on the Altwen Rocks, in Carnarvon Bay with the loss of four of her crew. She was carrying timber to Newport. A Parliamentary report on the loss of timber ships noted that she was lost or abandoned on 1 December 1838.

Robert Quayle was last listed in the 1838 volume of Lloyd's Register.
