= Regalia (1811 ship) =

British merchant ship and whaler 1811–1852

History

United Kingdom
- Name: Regalia
- Namesake: Regalia
- Builder: Monkwearmouth, Sunderland
- Launched: 28 December 1811
- Fate: Crushed by ice 20 June 1852 (Note: One report has her being lost at sea in 1831. The lost vessel was a different Regalia of Sunderland.)

General characteristics
- Tons burthen: 36080/94 or 369, or 370, or 372, or 377 (bm)
- Armament: 8 × 18-pounder carronades

Regalia was launched at Sunderland in 1811. In 1819 she made a voyage to Calcutta, sailing under a license from the British East India Company (EIC). She also sailed to New South Wales and Van Diemen's Land. From Sydney she engaged in several sealing hunting voyages to the waters around Macquarie Island. In 1826 she transported convicts from Dublin to New South Wales. From 1831 until 1852, when she was wrecked at Davis Strait, Regalia was a whaler in the northern whale fishery.

== Career ==
Regalia entered Lloyd's Register (LR) in 1812 with Js.Hall, owner. The Register of Shipping (RS) for 1813 showed her with G.Palmer, master, Wellbank, owner, and trade Plymouth transport.

In 1813 the EIC had lost its monopoly on the trade between India and Britain. British ships were then free to sail to India or the Indian Ocean under a license from the EIC. Captain Francis Dixon sailed from England on 12 June 1819, bound for Fort William (Calcutta). Then on 7 August 1822 Captain T. Collins sailed from England for Port Jackson and Van Diemen's Land. She arrived at Hobart Town on 4 January 1823.

In connection with these voyages Regalia engaged in sealing around Macquarie Island, from Sydney in 1820 and 1821 under Captain Francis Dixon and in 1822 and 1823 under Captain William Collins. On one voyage she left Hobart in August 1820 and gathered 260 tons of elephant seal oil. Robert Quayle was at Macquarie Island at the same time and gathered 150 tons.

Regalia embarked convicts at Dublin around early March 1826. She attempted to sail but was driven back to the harbour. During the night she drifted close to the shore. A guard heard the captain tell his crew to ready her boat so that they might escape. The guard told Lieutenant William Sacheverell Coke, who commanded the detachment from the 39th Regiment of Foot. Coke mustered his men and ordered them to shoot anyone attempting to leave Regalia. Regalia twice more attempted unsuccessfully to leave.

Captain Robert Burt finally succeeded in sailing Regalia from Dublin on 14 March 1826. She passed Madeira on 25 March and reached the Cape Verde Island on 5 April. She touched at Rio de Janeiro on the voyage. Regalia arrived in Port Jackson on 5 August 1826. She had embarked 130 convicts and landed 129.

RS for 1829 showed Regalia with W. Sadler, master, changing to Graham, J.Row, owner, and trade London, changing to London–Quebec. She had undergone small repairs in 1828.

In 1831 Regalia became a Northern Whale Fishery whaler, sailing out of London. The RS for 1832 showed her with Philips, master, Mellish, owner, and trade London–Greenland. She had undergone small repairs in 1828 and a good repair in 1831. The following data is from Coltish:

Year	Master	Where	Whales	Tuns whale oil
1831	Philips	Greenland	5	85
1832	Philips	Greenland	4	35
1833	Philips		26	240
1834	Philips	Davis Strait	11	82

Lloyd's List reported that Regalia was still whaling in 1835 and 1836. She had, however, transferred her homeport to Kirkaldy, and was whaling out of Leith. The following data too is from Coltish:

Year	Master	Where	Whales	Tuns whale oil
1835			1	12
1836	Phillips			
1837	Elder		2	15
1838	Elder		7	52
1839	Elder		1	12
1840	Kerr		0	0

Regalia continued to whale in Northern Whale Fishery, but details of her voyages are currently not available in readily accessible online records.

== Fate ==
LR for 1851 showed Regalia with D.Robbs, master, Dugall, owner, and trade Leith–Davis Strait. Her homeport was still Kirkcaldy. She had undergone small repairs in 1844 and 1849.

Regalia was lost in the Davis Strait in 1852. On 20 June 1852 ice crushed her. The crew then got drunk and set fire to her.
