= Robert Quayle =

Robert Quayle may refer to:

- Robert Howard Quayle, chief minister for the Isle of Man
- Robert Quayle, character in the 1969 film Baby Love
- Robert Quayle (1814 ship), UK merchant ship and whaler (1814–1838)
