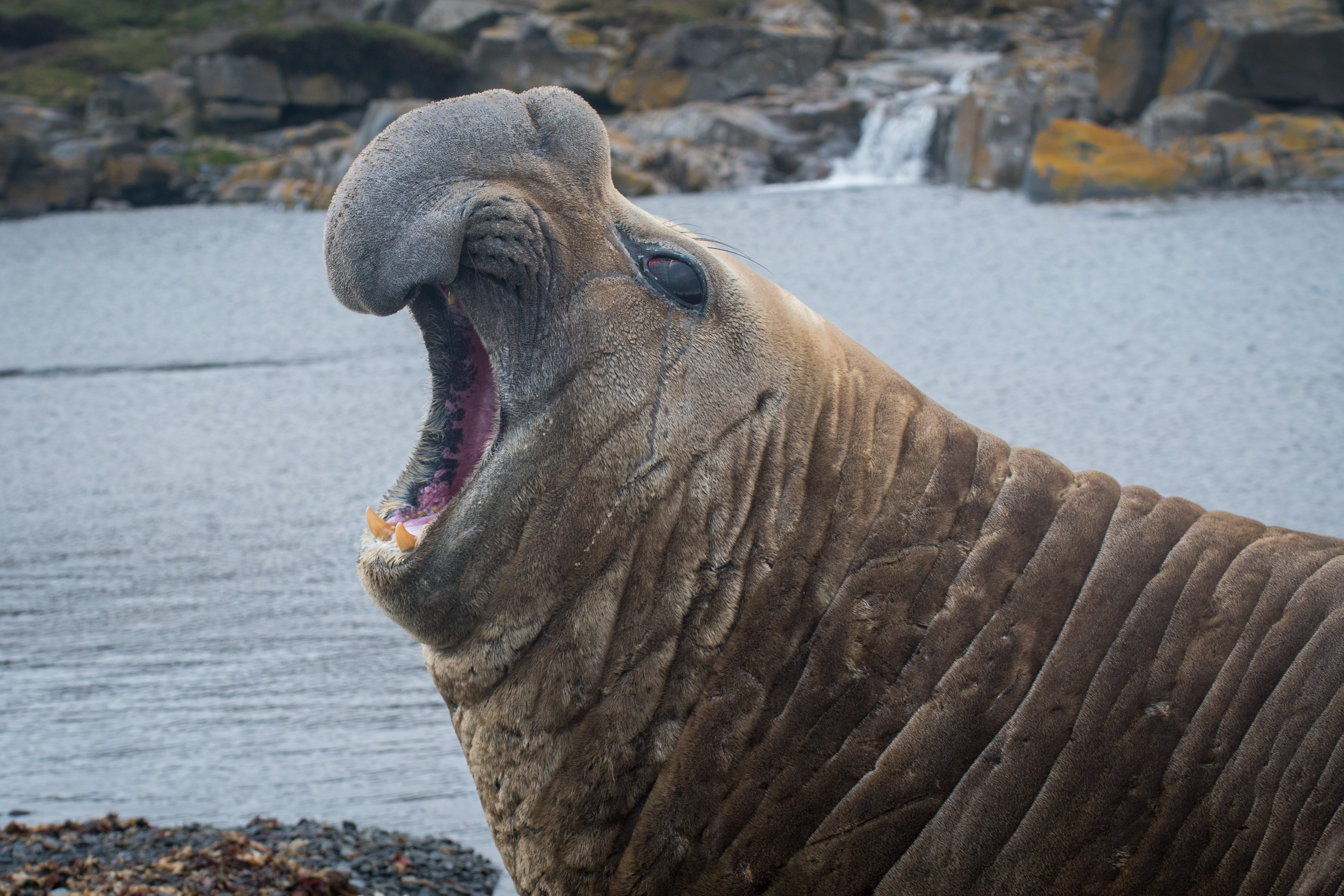
- Male (bull)
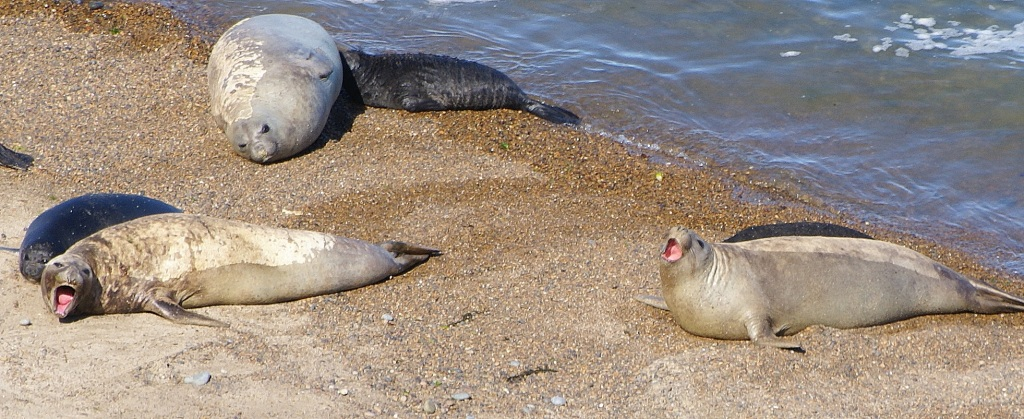
- Females (cows) and pups

Conservation status
- Vulnerable (IUCN 3.1)
- CITES Appendix II

Scientific classification
- Kingdom: Animalia
- Phylum: Chordata
- Class: Mammalia
- Order: Carnivora
- Parvorder: Pinnipedia
- Family: Phocidae
- Genus: Mirounga
- Species: M. leonina

Binomial name
- Mirounga leonina (Linnaeus, 1758)
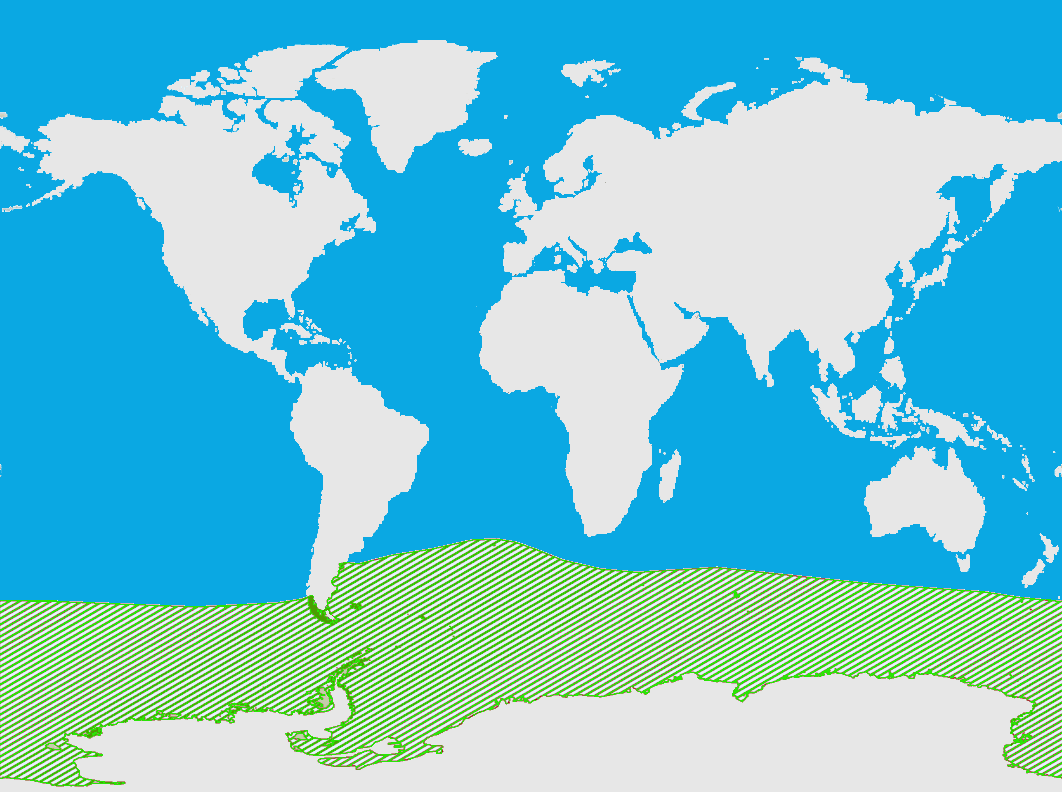
- Southern elephant seal range

Synonyms
- Phoca leonina Linnaeus, 1758; Macrorhinus leoninus (Linn.); Macrorhinus elephantinus

= Southern elephant seal =

Southern elephant seal Temporal range: Pleistocene-recent

Species of marine mammal

The southern elephant seal (Mirounga leonina) is one of two species of elephant seals. It is the largest member of the clade Pinnipedia and the order Carnivora, as well as the largest extant marine mammal that is not a cetacean. It gets its name from its massive size and the large proboscis of the adult male, which is used to produce very loud roars, especially during the breeding season. A bull southern elephant seal is about more than twice the weight of a male northern elephant seal (Mirounga angustirostris) as large sub-adult southern elephant seals have weighed 3 tons, as well as more than twice the weight of a male Pacific walrus (Odobenus rosmarus divergens).

== Taxonomy ==
The southern elephant seal was one of the many species originally described by Swedish zoologist Carl Linnaeus in the landmark 1758 10th edition of his Systema Naturae, where it was given the binomial name of Phoca leonina. John Edward Gray established the genus Mirounga in 1827.

In the nineteenth century, the species was often called "bottle-nosed seal".

== Description ==
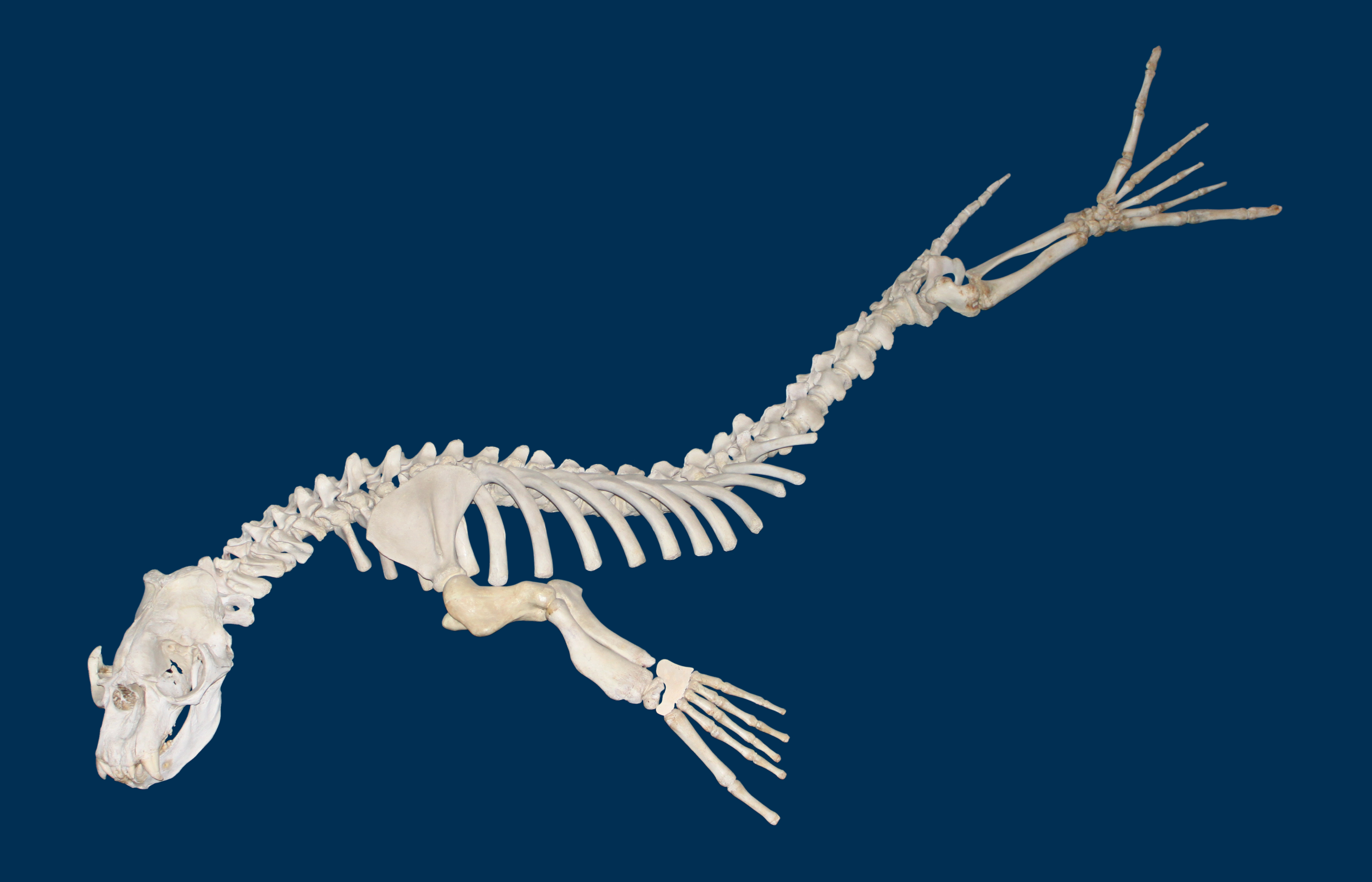
Skeleton of a southern elephant seal

The southern elephant seal is distinguished from the northern elephant seal (which does not overlap in range with this species) by its greater body mass and a shorter proboscis. The southern males also appear taller when fighting, due to their tendency to bend their backs more strongly than the northern species. This species may also exhibit the greatest sexual dimorphism of any mammal in terms of mass ratio, with males typically four to five times heavier than females. On average female southern elephant seals weigh 350 to 900 kg (770 to 1,980 lb) and measure 2.6 to 3 m (8.5 to 9.8 ft) long, whereas adult bulls can range from 3,000 to 3,700 kg (6,600 to 8,200 lb) and grow to 4.6 to 5.8 m (15 to 19 ft) in length if including rear flippers. For comparison, among the northern elephant seal and the sperm whale (Physeter macrocephalus)—two other large marine mammals that are highly sexual dimorphic by size—males typically outweigh females by a factor of three to four.

Southern elephant seal size also varies regionally. Studies have indicated elephant seals from South Georgia are around 30% heavier and 10% longer on average than those from Macquarie Island. The record-sized bull, shot in Possession Bay, South Georgia, on 28 February 1913, measured 6.5024 m (21.333 ft) long in total length when flensed however no documented length with blubber, and no current reliable estimations of body mass in the massive male. The biggest directly documented weight of a male elephant seal was 4357 pounds and 13 ft and 4 inches long, though it very likely was not fully grown. The maximum size of a female is 1,000 kg (2,200 lb) and 3.7 m (12 ft).

A southern elephant seal's eyes are large, round, and black. The width of the eyes, and a high concentration of low-light pigments, suggest sight plays an important role in the capture of prey. Like all seals, elephant seals have hind limbs whose ends form the tail and tail fin. Each of the "feet" can deploy five long, webbed fingers. This agile dual palm is used to propel water. The pectoral fins are used little while swimming. While their hind limbs are unfit for locomotion on land, elephant seals use their fins as support to propel their bodies. They are able to propel themselves quickly (as fast as 10 km/h (6.2 mph)) in this way for short-distance travel, to return to water, to catch up with a female, or to chase an intruder.

Pups are born with fur and are completely black. Their coats are unsuited to water but protect infants by insulating them from the cold air. The first molting accompanies weaning. After molting, the coats may turn grey and brown, depending on the thickness and moisture of hair. Among older males, the skin takes the form of a thick leather which is often scarred.

Like other seals, the vascular system of elephant seals is adapted to the cold; a mixture of small veins surround arteries, capturing heat from them. This structure is present in extremities such as the hind legs.

== Range and population ==
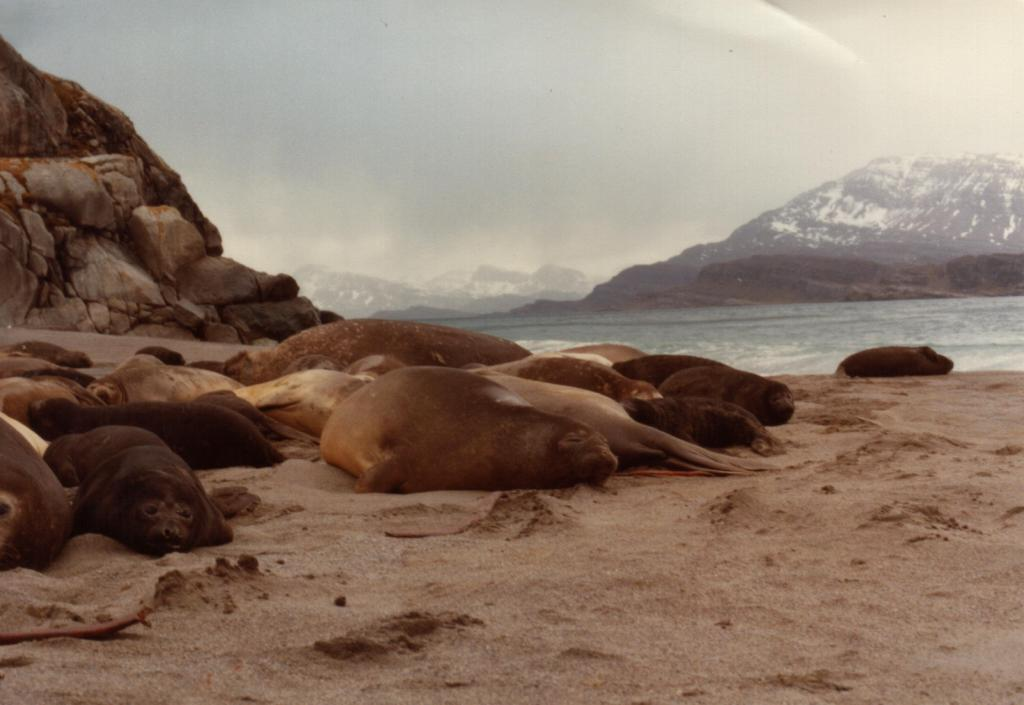
Southern elephant seal harem on a beach on the Kerguelen Islands

Southern elephant seal world population was estimated at 650,000 in the mid-1990s, and was estimated in 2005 at between 664,000 and 740,000. As of 2025, the population has been estimated at close to 700,000 globally. Studies have shown the existence of three geographic subpopulations, one in each of the three oceans.

Tracking studies have indicated the routes traveled by elephant seals, demonstrating their main feeding area is at the edge of the Antarctic continent. While elephant seals may come ashore in Antarctica occasionally to rest or to mate, they gather to breed in subantarctic locations.

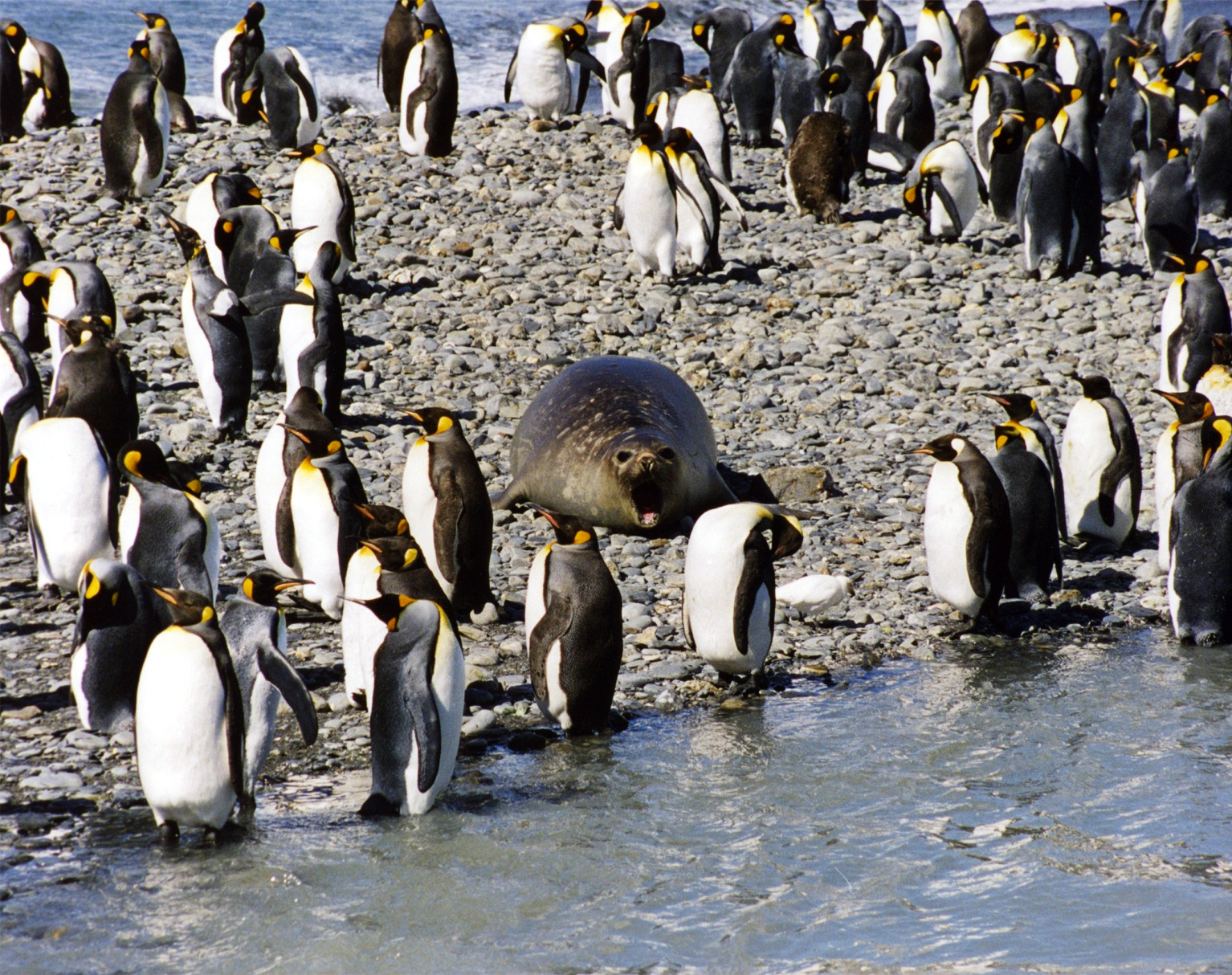
King penguins and southern elephant seal pup at South Georgia Island

The largest subpopulation is in the South Atlantic, with more than 400,000 individuals, including Gough Island and about 113,000 breeding females on South Georgia. The other breeding colonies of the Atlantic subpopulation are located on the Falkland Islands and Valdes Peninsula in Argentina (the only continental breeding population).

The second subpopulation, in the south Indian Ocean, consists of up to 200,000 individuals, three-quarters of which breed in the Kerguelen Islands and the rest in the Crozet Islands, Marion and Prince Edward Islands, and Heard Island. Some individuals also breed on Amsterdam Island.

The third subpopulation of about 75,000 seals is found in the subantarctic islands of the Pacific Ocean south of Tasmania and New Zealand, mainly Macquarie Island.

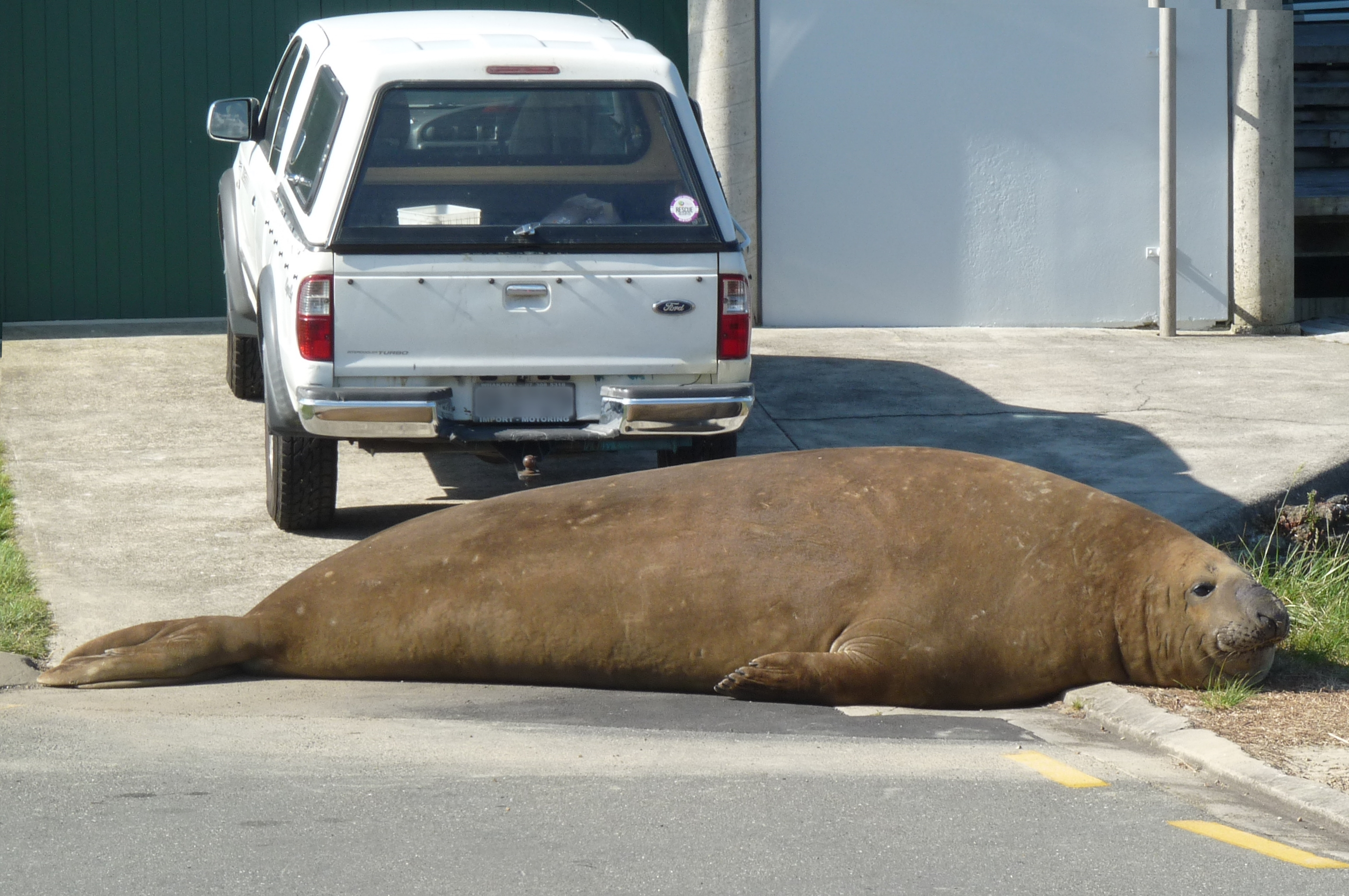
A hauling-out in Whakatāne, New Zealand

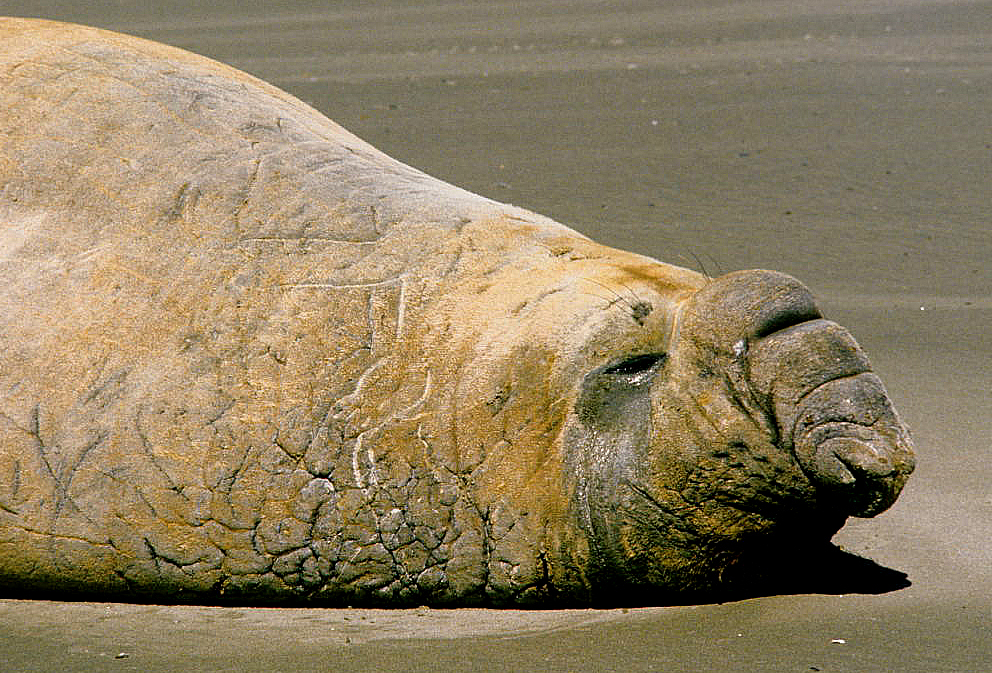
A hauling-out In Punta Delgada, Argentina

Colonies once existed in Tasmania, Saint Helena, and the Juan Fernández Islands off the coast of Chile. Some individuals at the time of molting have been found in South Africa, Australia or Uruguay. Lost animals have also been reported from time to time on the shores of Mauritius, with two reports from the Río Guayas estuary area in Ecuador, on Copacabana Beach in Brazil, and a beach in Lima, Peru. Reality of the creature so called Manatee of Helena had been pointed out as possible misidentification of elephant seals historically present on Saint Helena.

In Chile, the species is currently believed to be in a process of re-colonization of its former range. It has for example been sighted in the 2010s at the mouth of Toltén River and at the Caicura Islets.

After the end of large-scale seal hunting in the 19th century, the southern elephant seal recovered to a sizable population in the 1950s; since then, an unexplained decline in the subpopulations of the Indian Ocean and Pacific Ocean has occurred. The population now seems to be stable; the reasons for the fluctuation are unknown. Suggested explanations include a phenomenon of depression following a rapid demographic rebound that depletes vital resources, a change in climate, competition with other species whose numbers also varied, or even an adverse influence of scientific monitoring techniques.

While not present there today, southern elephant seals once occupied the Ross Sea, where remains have been found dating from about 7,000 to 500 years BP (Before Present). From this, it is inferred that ocean temperatures were warmer at the time, with less ice. Later, expanding glaciers and sea ice caused the seals' coastal colonies to be abandoned.

== Behavior ==
=== Social behavior and reproduction ===
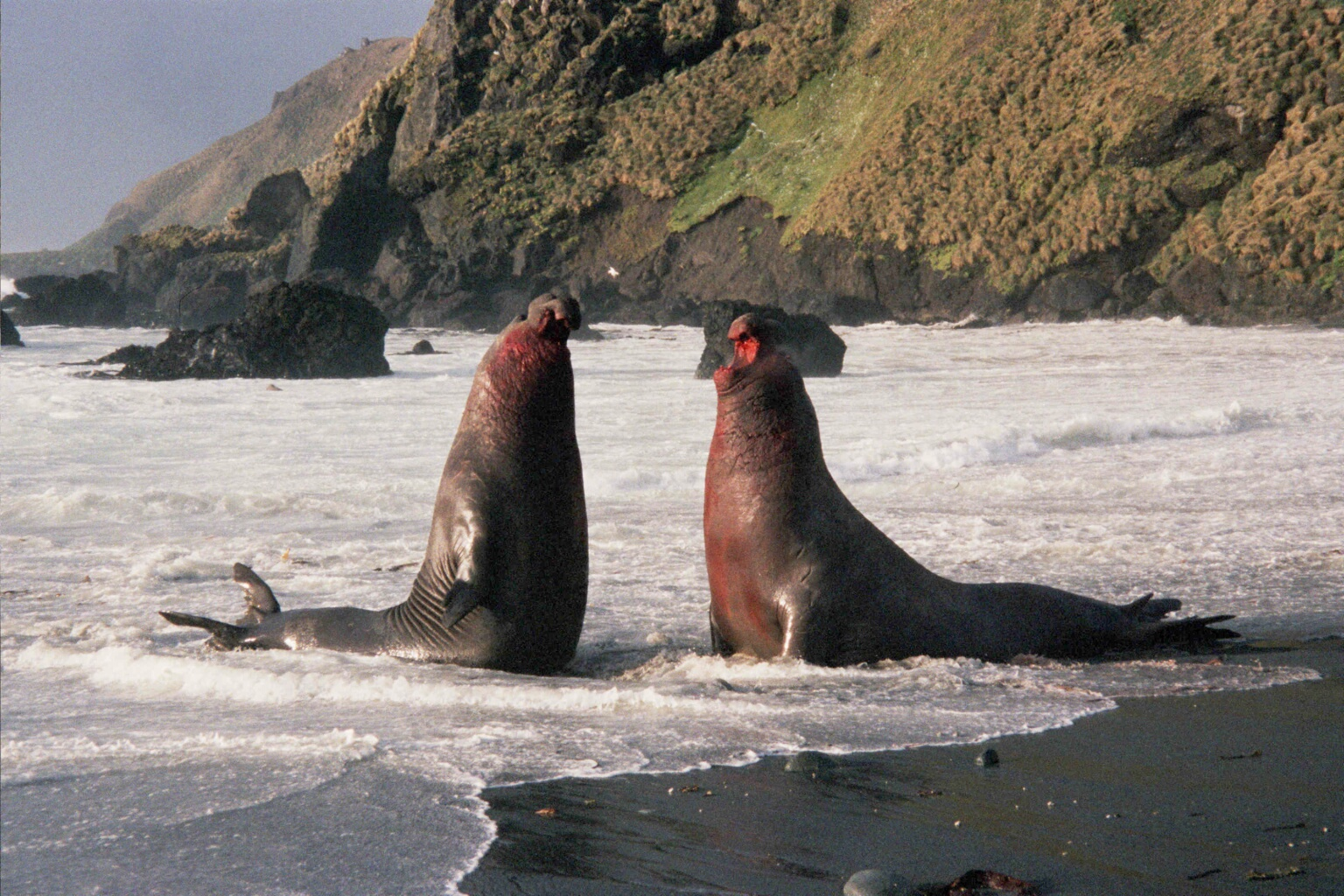
Bull elephant seals fighting

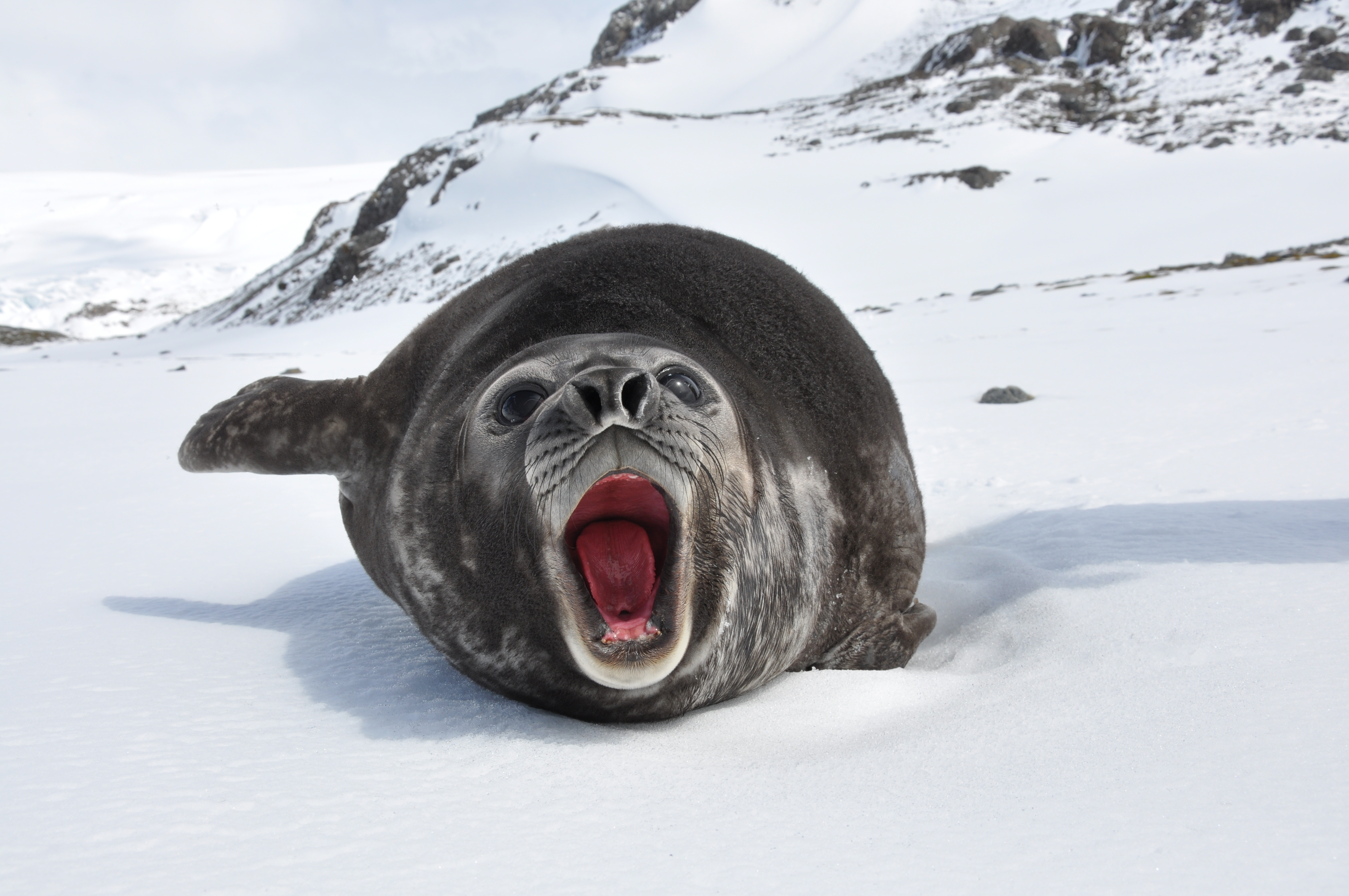
Juvenile Southern Elephant Seal in South Georgia.

Calls of two males on Macquarie Island.

Elephant seals are among the seals that can stay on land for the longest periods of time, as they can stay dry for several consecutive weeks each year. Males arrive in the colonies earlier than the females and fight for control of harems when they arrive. Large body size confers advantages in fighting, and the agonistic relationships of the bulls gives rise to a dominance hierarchy, with access to harems and activity within harems being determined by rank. The dominant bulls ("harem masters") establish harems of several dozen females. The least successful males have no harems, but they may try to copulate with a harem male's females when the male is not looking. The majority of primiparous females and a significant proportion of multiparous females' mate at sea with roaming males away from harems.

An elephant seal must stay in his territory to defend it, which could mean months without eating, having to live on his blubber storage. Two fighting males use their weight and canine teeth against each other. The outcome is rarely fatal, and the defeated bull will flee; however, bulls can suffer severe tears and cuts. Some males can stay ashore for more than three months without food. Males commonly vocalize with a coughing roar that serves in both individual recognition and size assessment. Conflicts between high-ranking males are more often resolved with posturing and vocalizing than with physical contact.

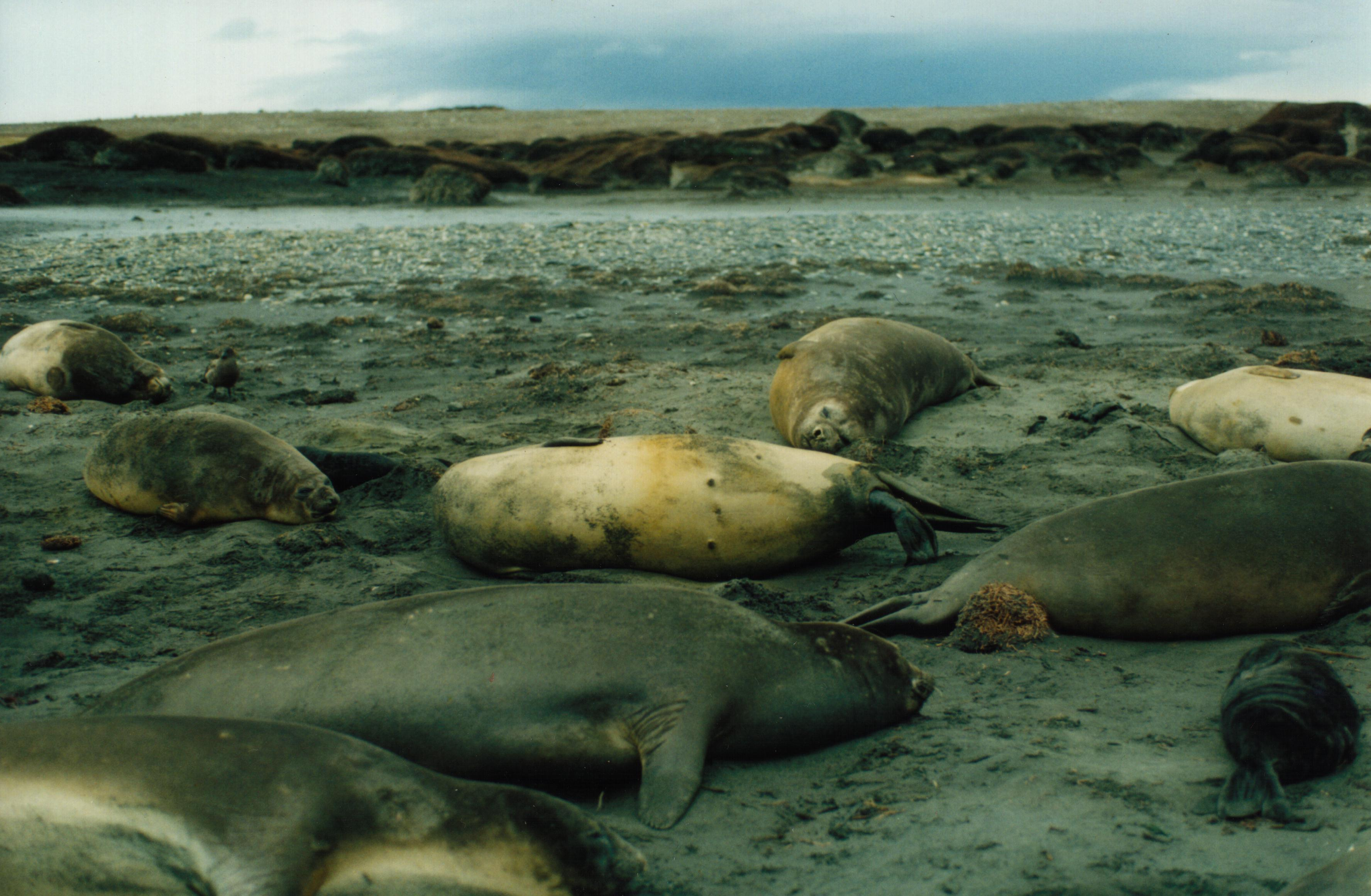
Females (one giving birth)

Generally, pups are born rather quickly in the breeding season. After being born, a newborn will bark or yap and its mother will respond with a high-pitched moan. The newborn begins to suckle immediately. Lactation lasts an average of 23 days. Throughout this period, the female fasts. Newborns weigh about 40 kg (88 lb) at birth and reach 120 to 130 kg (260 to 290 lb) by the time they are weaned. The mother loses significant weight during this time. Young, weaned seals gather in nurseries until they lose their birth coats. They enter the water to practice swimming, generally starting their apprenticeship in estuaries or ponds. In summer, the elephant seals come ashore to molt. This sometimes happens directly after reproduction.

=== Feeding and diving ===
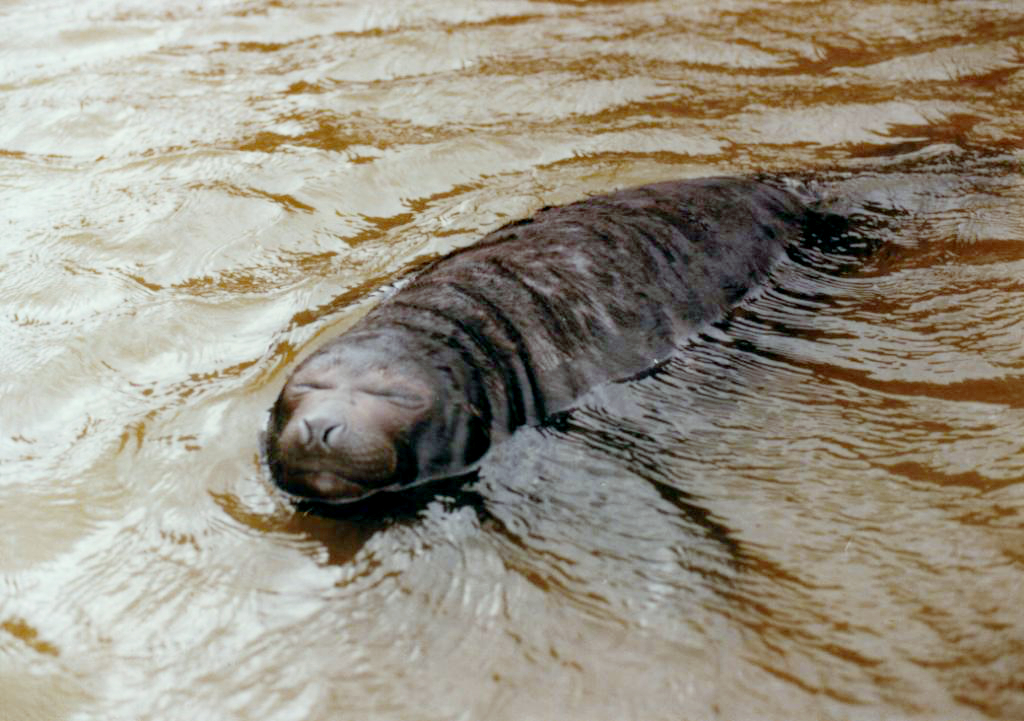
Southern elephant seal (just weaned pup): first bath

Satellite tracking revealed the seals spend very little time on the surface, usually a few minutes for breathing. They dive repeatedly, each time for more than 20 minutes, to hunt their prey—squid and fish—at depths of 400 to 1,000 m (1,300 to 3,300 ft). They are the deepest diving air-breathing non-cetaceans and have been recorded at a maximum of 2,388 m (7,835 ft) in depth.

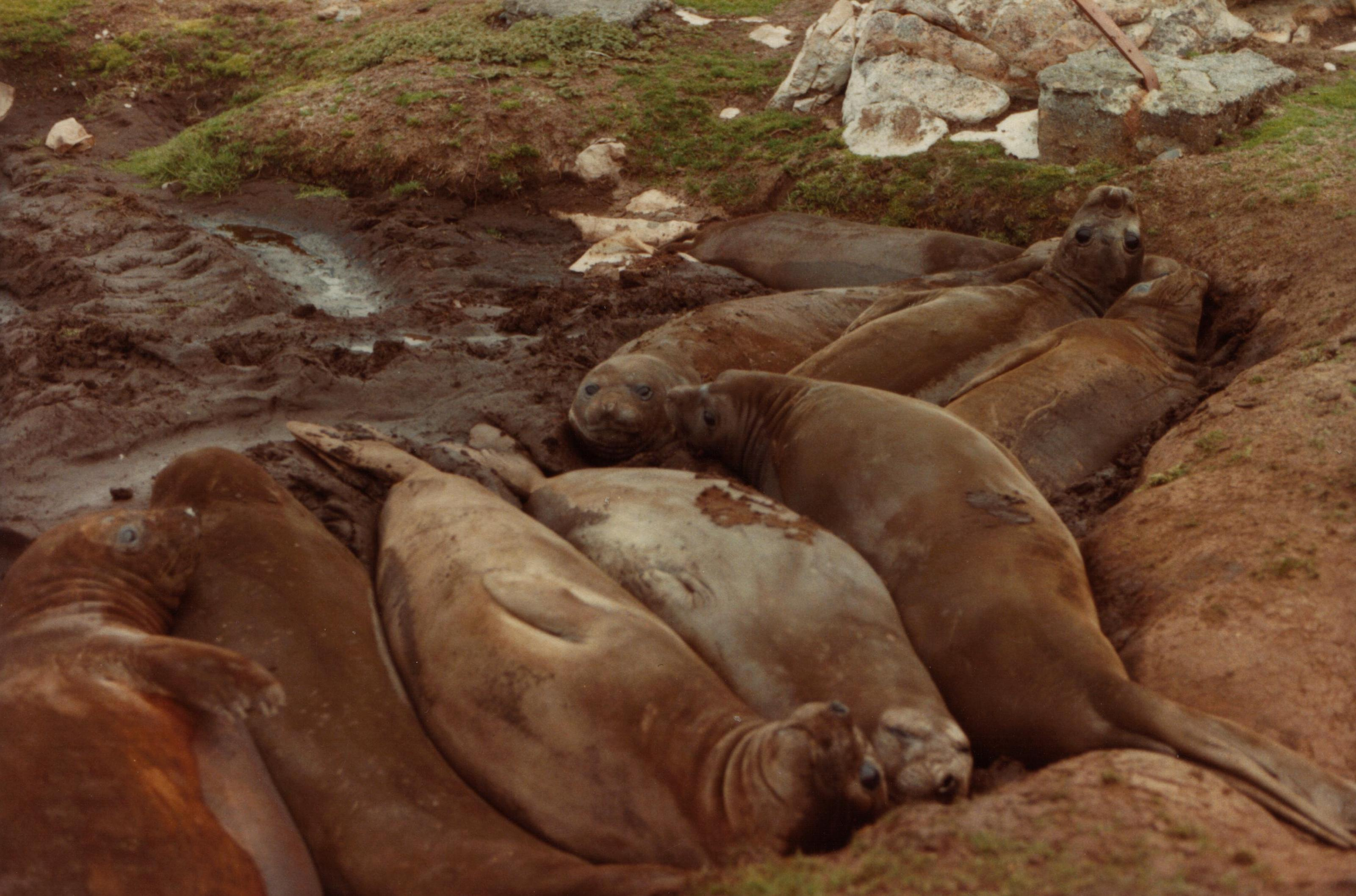
Southern elephant seal (young males): collective mudbath during moulting

As for the duration, depth and sequence of dives, the southern elephant seal is the best performing seal. In many regards, they exceed even most cetaceans. These capabilities result from nonstandard physiological adaptations, common to marine mammals, but particularly developed in elephant seals. The coping strategy is based on increased oxygen storage and reduced oxygen consumption.

In the ocean, the seals apparently live alone. Most females dive in pelagic zones for foraging, while males dive in both pelagic and benthic zones. Individuals will return annually to the same hunting areas. Due to the inaccessibility of their deep-water foraging areas, no comprehensive information has been obtained about their dietary preferences, although some observation of hunting behavior and prey selection has occurred.

While hunting in the dark depths, elephant seals seem to locate their prey, at least in part, using vision; the bioluminescence of some prey animals can facilitate their capture. Elephant seals do not have a developed system of echolocation in the manner of cetaceans, but their vibrissae (facial whiskers), which are sensitive to vibrations, are assumed to play a role in search of food. When at the subantarctic or Antarctic coasts, the seals forage largely on deep-sea cephalopod species such as Psychroteuthis glacialis, Alluroteuthis antarcticus, Histioteuthis eltaninae, Onykia ingens, Gonatus antarcticus, Martialia hyadesi, Filippovia knipovitchi, and other molluscs, various fish species, including lanternfish (i.e. Electrona spp. and Gymnoscopelus spp.), nothothens (i.e. Genera Lepidonotothen, Pleuragramma, Trematomus, Pagothenia,), Channichthyidsae spp., Bathylagidae spp., krill (mostly Euphausia spp.) and other crustaceans, and even algae.

=== Predation ===
Weaned pups and juveniles may fall prey to orcas. Cases where weaned pups have been attacked and killed by leopard seals (Hydrurga leptonyx) and New Zealand sea lions (Phocarctos hookeri), exclusively small pups in the latter case, have been recorded. Great white sharks (Carcharodon carcharias) have hunted elephant seals near Campbell Island, although there is currently no documentation of a great white shark successfully hunting an adult bull southern elephant seal. Bite marks from a southern sleeper shark (Somniosus antarcticus) have been found on surviving elephant seals in Macquarie Island.

== Conservation ==
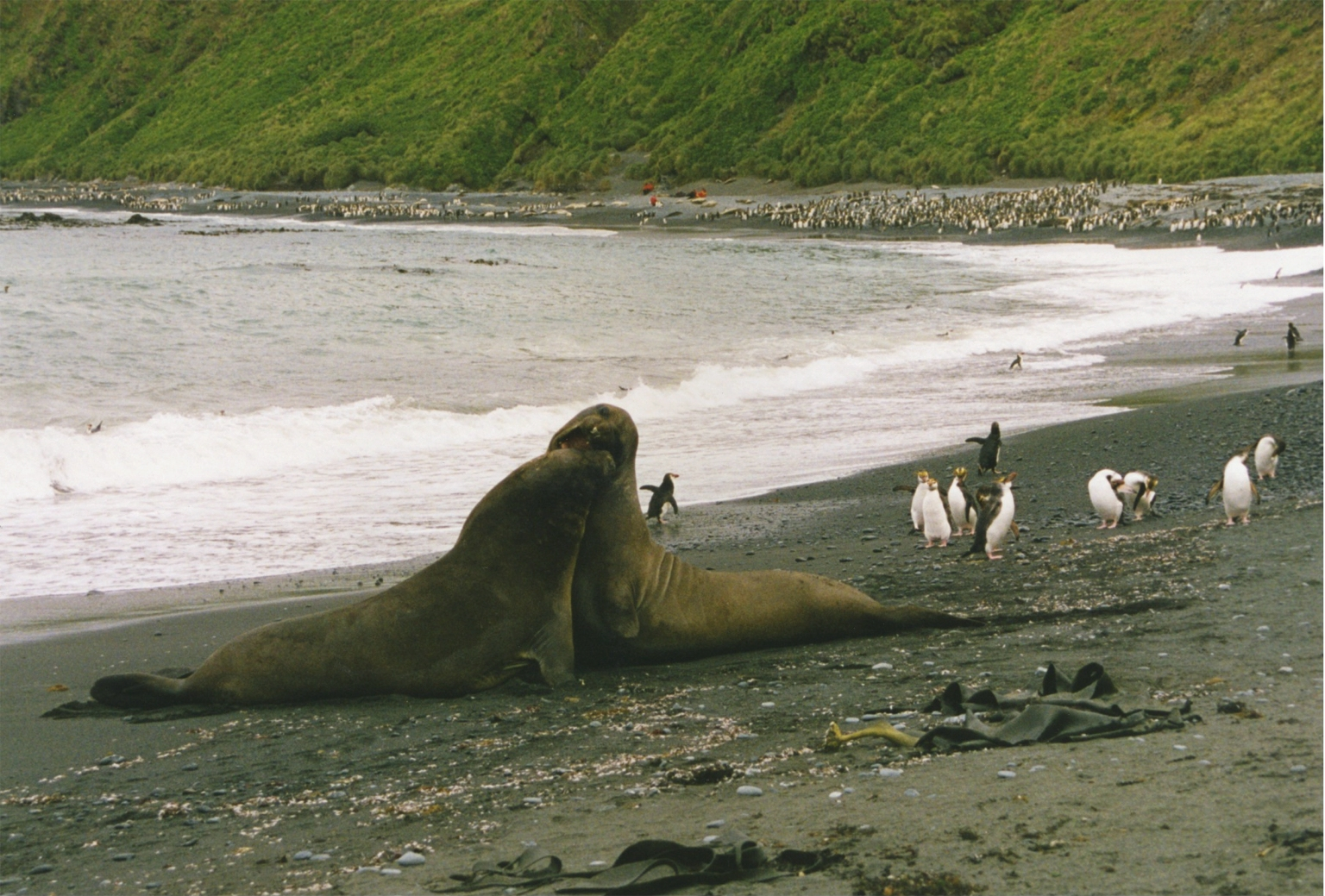
Play fight

After their near extinction due to hunting in the 19th century, the total population was estimated at between 664,000 and 740,000 in 2005. The reasons for this are unclear, but are thought to be related to the distribution and declining levels of the seals' primary food sources. As of 2025 the ICUN red list, the regional population trend is increasing, and has been downlisted compared to 2016. Most of their important breeding sites are now protected by international treaty, as UNESCO World Heritage Sites, or by national legislation.

== Climate change ==
Climate change likely has a wide-ranging and diverse impact on marine species such as southern elephant seals. As top predators in the Southern Ocean, southern elephant seals inhabit one of the most sensitive and vulnerable regions to rapid climate change. Global efforts such as the Southern elephant seals as oceanographic samplers and the Marine Mammals Exploring the Oceans Pole to Pole projects have led to the collection of a large suite of long-term coupled behavioral-oceanographic data. As part of these projects, satellite-relay data loggers were attached to southern elephant seals to collect physical and biological data. This simultaneous collection of behavioral and environmental data, spanning more than ten years, has enabled researchers to study the impact of climate change on southern elephant seals and the Antarctic ecosystem. This data provides information on how the Southern Ocean is changing in relation to climate change as well as how these species respond to changes.

These projects focused on southern elephant seals because they are deep divers as well as a major predator in the Southern Ocean in terms of their population size and food consumption. As predators of the upper levels of the food-web, their foraging success and population dynamics impart valuable information about productivity at different trophic levels. The well-being of southern elephant seals therefore mirrors that of the whole Antarctic ecosystem.

Southern elephant seals from different colonies frequent specific oceanographic regions to forage. They feed most successfully in areas with specific hydrographic properties, e.g. the upwelling regions of Circumpolar Deep Water within the Antarctic Circumpolar Current. In the Southern Ocean, southern elephant seals associate more frequently with southerly, higher‐latitude fronts and frontal zones. However, the foraging success in association with these regions varies strongly according to year, season and sex. Some of the seasonal and interannual variations in foraging success can be linked to climatic changes such as positional shifts in fronts and variability associated with frontal positions. Generally, southern elephant seals appear to be resilient against the apparent variability in the location and productivity of frontal systems.

As of 2026, the population numbers have bounced back, but researchers are unsure how the trend of the global population will change over time.

== Notable individuals ==
One of the most famous southern elephant seals was Minazo, who lived in Japan's Enoshima Aquarium from when he was a half-year old until his death in 2005 at age 11. Minazo became popular for his signature bucket-holding, tongue-lolling pose. In 2006, Minazo was memorialized by the Japanese noise musician Masami Akita, also known as Merzbow, in a two-volume album, with artwork by Jenny Akita showing Minazo holding his beloved bucket. In 2007, Minazo became the subject of an image macro similar to lolcat called "lolrus". In his liner notes, Masami Akita suggested Minazo's frequent and demanding performances left him exhausted, contributing ultimately to his death. Akita's intention in celebrating Minazo was to highlight the plight of captive animals used for performance before public audiences. Minazo has also been featured on several T-shirt designs.

In late 2023, a 600-kilogram (1,320 lb) southern elephant seal nicknamed "Neil the Seal" became an internet sensation after repeatedly appearing in residential areas in southern Tasmania, causing numerous issues such as preventing a woman from going to work by resting in front of her car. His repeated interactions with humans have caused concern for Neil's welfare as well as potential risks to the public.

== See also ==
- List of largest mammals
- Lepidophthirus macrorhini – louse parasitizing southern elephant seals

== Bibliography ==
- "Biology, threats and conservation status of the SUB-ANTARCTIC FUR SEAL AND SOUTHERN ELEPHANT SEAL in Australian waters" (PDF). Australian Government, Department of the Environment and Heritage, Canberra. 2004. Archived from the original (PDF) on 3 June 2011.
- Block, D.; Meyer, Philip; Myers, P. (2004). "Mirounga leonina (Southern elephant seal)". Animal Diversity Web. The Regents of the University of Michigan. Archived from the original on 27 February 2010.
- "Mirounga leonina". Integrated Taxonomic Information System.
- "Mirounga leonina, Southern Elephant Seal". MarineBio. The MarineBio Conservation Society. 6 April 2017.
- Perrin, W.F.; Wursig, Bernd G.; and Thewissen, J.G.M. Encyclopedia of Marine Mammals. San Diego, Calif.: Academic Press, 2002.
- "Southern Elephant Seals". Wildlife of Antarctica. Antarctic Connection. Archived from the original on 9 October 2008.
- "Southern elephant seals biology". Elephant seals. Elephant Seal Research Group.
