= Punta Delgada, Argentina =

Punta Delgada
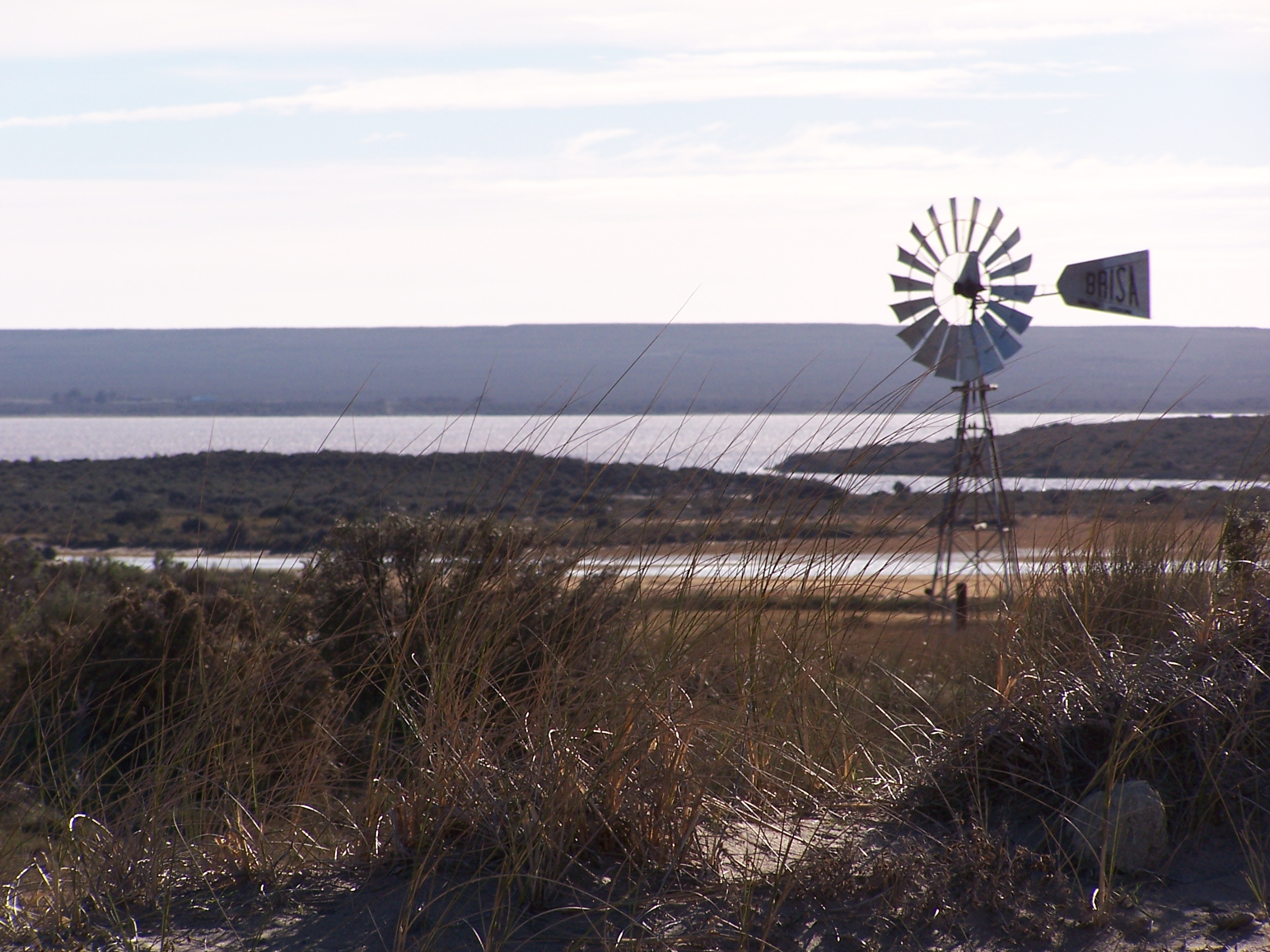
- Country: Argentina
- Province: Chubut

Population (2001)
  - Total: 49
  - Density: 1/km^{2} (3/sq mi)
- Post Code: U9201

Punta Delgada is a locality and tourist resort on the Valdes Peninsula in Biedma Department in the north of the province of Chubut, Argentina. It is situated on the Golfo Nuevo.

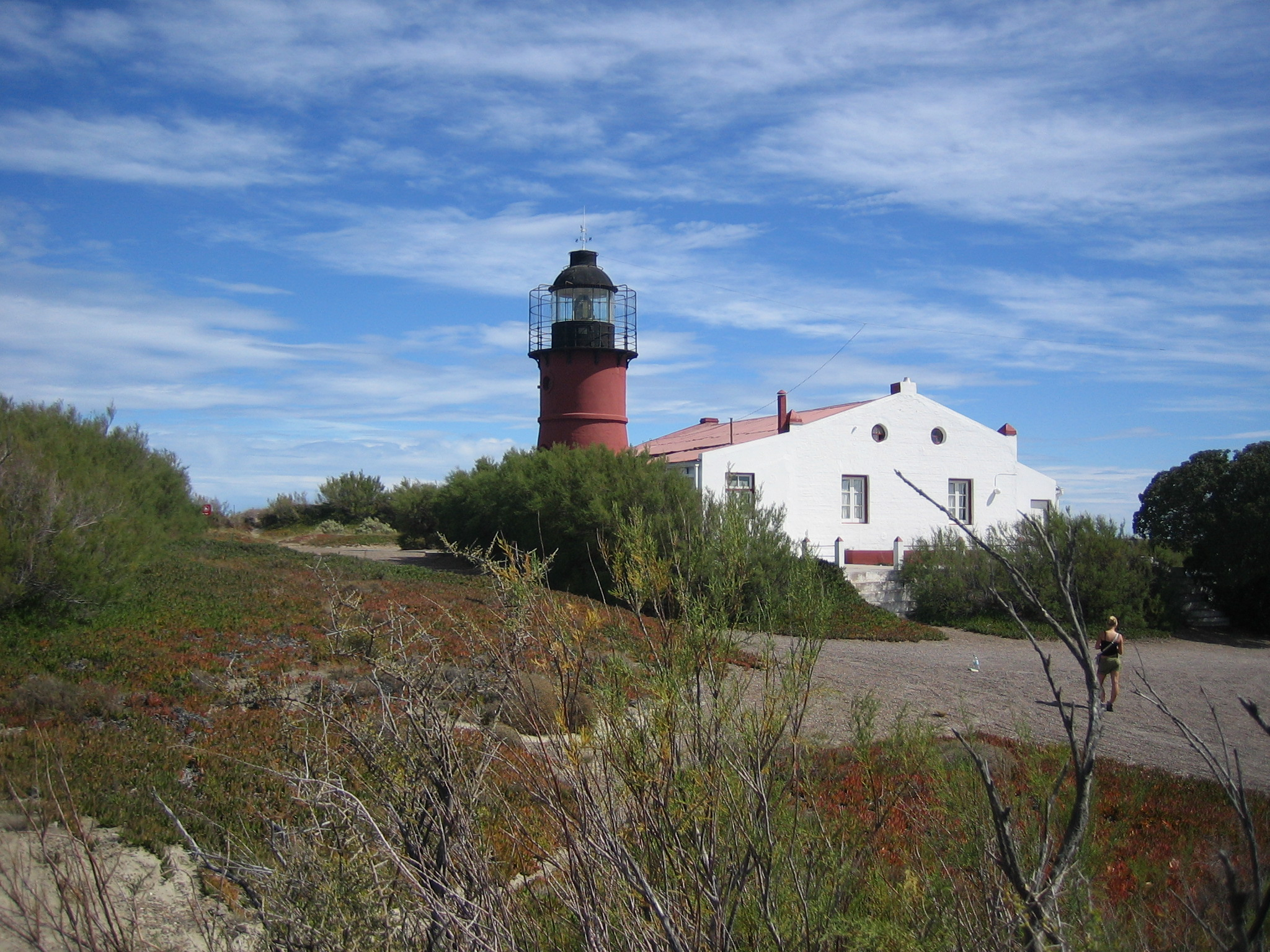
Punta Delgada Lighthouse

The main attractions are a colony of elephant seals and an active lighthouse built in 1905. The buildings around the lighthouse have been converted into a hotel and restaurant, to accommodate visitors to the area. The 14-metre-high (46 ft) cast-iron lighthouse tower contains a Fresnel lens, which emits a pattern of three white flashes every twenty-five seconds.
