= Neil the Seal =

Australian southern elephant seal (born 2020)

Neil
- Species: Southern elephant seal (Mirounga leonina)
- Sex: Male
- Born: October 2020 (age 6)
- Residence: South East Tasmania, Australia
- Weight: 1,000 kg (2,205 lb; 157 st 7 lb)
- Notes (estimated weight in 2026)

Neil (born October 2020), also known as Neil the Seal, is a southern elephant seal in the Australian state of Tasmania. He was born in Salem Bay, Tasmania.

Neil has spent several month-long moulting periods in and around the city of Hobart. Photos and videos of Neil became popular online in July 2022.

== Sightings ==
Neil was first observed in July 2022 while resting in Hobart during a period of moulting. He returned in 2023.

In April 2023 he was seen on Kingston Beach, and in December 2023 in the town of Dunalley.

Neil was reportedly seen again in good health near Hobart in May 2025, though local news requested that his exact location no longer be shared for his own protection.

In June 2026, estimated at 3 m (9.8 ft) in length and weighing 1,000 kg (2,200 lb), Neil returned to Tasmania to shed On 9 July 2026, authorities said Neil had likely returned to sea. On 10 July 2026, in the coastal town of Seven Mile Beach, Tasmania on Tasmania's southeast coast, he was reportedly seen again.

== Interactions with humans ==
While most people kept a safe distance, incidents of humans disturbing the seal led to traffic cones placed to protect him. Neil playing with the traffic cones attracted more attention to his unusual behaviour.

Later events saw Neil more closely interacting with humans, often leaving the beach and resting on the city's roads, or even following people. In one instance in 2023, then weighing an estimated 600 kg (1,300 lb), Neil was found basking on someone's front lawn for a few hours in Hobart, preventing a local woman from accessing her car. He was later relocated in April 2023 by officials of the Department of Natural Resources and Environment after people and dogs harassed him in Kingston Beach, but by December 2023 he had reappeared roughly 112 kilometres away in the town of Dunalley, where local news reported his continued interactions with locals, as well as the downing of a local real estate company's fence.

In response to people approaching Neil to take photographs, Department of Natural Resources and Environment Tasmania (NRE Tas) warned residents to keep their distance, saying that although Neil is "not inherently aggressive", he is still a large marine predator and may lash out defensively. The situation was compared to that of Freya the walrus, who attracted crowds in Norway in 2022 and was shot over public safety concerns. If he reaches maturity at age 12, Neil could grow to 5 m (16 ft) in length and potentially weigh up to 4,000 kg (8,800 lb), and become more territorial.

== Monitoring and management ==
Neil is monitored by the Marine Conservation Program, established by Tasmania's Department of Natural Resources and Environment, for health and safety reasons.

From 2025 to 2026, NRE Tas had spent about AU$45,000 (US$33,835) managing Neil, the majority relating to staffing and labour. In July 2026, Neil stayed for fifteen days in Clarence City, during which Neil caused about AU$31,000 (US$23,308) in damages. This included flattening one street sign, knocking over ten traffic bollards, and crushing a section of fence. His repeated visits over the years have prompted NRE Tas to develop and put into effect the "Neil the Seal Management Plan" as of November 2026.

== In popular culture ==
Neil has 208,000 followers on Instagram under the username "neiltheseal22" as of 7 July 2026, and over 1,300,000 followers on TikTok as of 15 December 2025. A fictionalized version of Neil, Kevin the seal, appears on the TV show Deadloch.

== See also ==
- Vagrancy (biology)
