= Nicholson (1802 ship) =

UK slave and merchant ship (1802–1810)

History

United Kingdom
- Name: Nicholson
- Launched: 1802, Liverpool
- Fate: Wrecked September 1810

General characteristics
- Tons burthen: 258(bm)
- Complement: 1804: 30; 1806: 30
- Armament: 1804: 16 × 9-pounder guns; 1806: 16 × 9&18-pounder guns; 1809: 16 × 9-pounder + 2 × 18-pounder guns + 6 × 9-pounder carronades

Nicholson was launched at Liverpool in 1802 as a slave ship in the triangular trade in enslaved people. She made four complete voyages transporting captives. Then when the Slave Trade Act 1807 ended British participation in the trans-Atlantic slave trade she started trading with Brazil. She was wrecked in 1810 returning to Liverpool from Pernambuco.

== Career ==
Nicholson first appeared in Lloyd's Register (LR) in 1802.

Year	Master	Owner	Trade	Source
1802	R.Pearson	John Shaw	Liverpool–Africa	LR

1st voyage transporting enslaved people (1802–1803): Captain Richard Pearson set sail from Liverpool on 20 September 1802 toward Africa. In 1802, 155 vessels sailed from English ports, bound for Africa to acquire and transport enslaved people; 122 of these vessels sailed from Liverpool.

Nicholson arrived at Havana in April 1803 carrying a total of 274 captives. She returned to Liverpool on 23 August. She had initially departed with 28 crew members; four crew members died during the voyage.

2nd voyage transporting enslaved people (1804–1805): Captain Richard Pearsons acquired a letter of marque on 17 January 1804. He sailed from Liverpool on 18 February. In 1804, 147 vessels sailed from English ports, bound for Africa to acquire and transport enslaved people; 126 of these vessels sailed from Liverpool.

Nicholson acquired captives at Loango. Nicholson arrived at Havana in October 1804 with 273 slaves. (She had first stopped at Demerara and from there had sailed to Suriname.) She sailed from Havana for Liverpool on 8 December and arrived back there on 5 March 1805. She had left Liverpool with 40 crew members and had suffered two crew deaths on her voyage.

However, Lloyd's List reported that Nicholson, Pearson, master, had arrived at Liverpool from Havana on 21 January 1805. It further reported that Nicholson, from Havana, had put into Dublin in distress. She had been on shore and greatly damaged her cargo, which had to be unloaded to lighten her.

3rd voyage transporting enslaved people (1806–1807): Captain William Kermod acquired a letter of marque on 31 May 1806. (Note: William Kermod(e) had earlier been captain of another slave ship, Baron Montalembert, in 1801–1802.) Captain Kermode sailed from Liverpool on 13 June.

Nicholson acquired captives at the Congo River and arrived at Charleston with 360 slaves on 15 December.

The captives, 360 "PRIME CONGO SLAVES", were offered for sale on 5 February 1807 at Charleston onboard Nicholson.

Nicholson sailed for Liverpool on 3 March 1807 and arrived there on 12 April. She had left Liverpool with 42 crew members and had suffered three crew deaths on her voyage.

Between 1 January 1806 and 1 May 1807, 185 vessels cleared Liverpool outward bound in the slave trade. Thirty of these vessels made two voyages during this period. Of the 155 vessels, 114 were regular slave ships, having made two voyages during the period, or voyages before 1806.

4th voyage transporting enslaved people (1807–1808): Captain Kermode sailed from Liverpool on 1 June 1807. (Note: The slave trade ended on 1 May 1807, but several vessels sailed after the deadline as they had cleared Customs outbound before 1 May.) He acquired captives at the Congo River. Nicholson arrived at Demerera in February 1808. She sailed for Liverpool on 23 June and arrived back there on 13 August. She had left Liverpool with 36 crew members and had suffered five crew deaths on her voyage. She returned to Liverpool with sugar, coffee, cotton, and wine.

With the end of the slave trade new owners sailed Nicholson in the trade with Brazil. The French invasion of Lisbon in November 1807 led the Portuguese royal family and the court to relocate to Rio De Janeiro. The Portuguese government in exile opened trade with Brazil to British vessels. This resulted in a great increase in British activity there between 1808 and 1810. Two Anglo-Portuguese treaties in 1810 formalized the new situation.

Year	Master	Owner	Trade	Source
1809	W.Kermode; J.Youd	J.Shaw; J.Kinnear	Liverpool–Africa; Liverpool–Brazils	LR
1811	J.Yond	Palmer & Co.	Liverpool–Brazils	LR

== Fate ==
As Nicholson was attempting to enter the docks at Liverpool from Pernambuco, in September 1810, the tide receded, leaving her dry. As she was a sharp vessel, with a heavy cargo, she sustained considerable damage.
