= Baron Montalembert (1795 ship) =

British merchant and slave ship (1795–1802)

History

Great Britain
- Name: Baron Montalembert
- Namesake: Jean Charles, baron of Montalembert (1757-1810) (Note: The Baron had been born in Nova Scotia. During the British intervention in the Haitian Revolution, he commanded the Legion Britanniques de Sainte-Domingue, a force of 1,200 men comprising white colonials, recruits from Europe, and possibly some free mixed-race Haitians. The unit fought well, but suffered casualties in combat and from disease. It was disbanded in 1797.)
- Launched: 1784, France
- Acquired: circa 1795 by purchase of a prize
- Fate: Wrecked 1802

General characteristics
- Tons burthen: 310, or 314, or 331 (bm)
- Armament: 16 × 6-pounder guns

Baron Montalembert (or Baron Montelambert, or Montlambert, or Montelambert, or other variations) was launched in France in 1784, probably under another name. She was taken in prize, and first appeared in Lloyd's List in 1795, sailing as a West Indiaman. Between 1799 and 1802 she made two voyages from Liverpool as a slave ship in the triangular trade in enslaved people. She was lost in 1802 during her second voyage transporting enslaved people, together with probably all of the captives she was carrying.

== Career ==
Lloyd's List reported in October 1795 that Baron Montilambert had arrived at Carthagena from Jamaica. Then it reported that Baron de Monte Lambert, Perry, master, had put into Ilfracombe in distress and would have to unload. She had been on her way from the West Indies to London. From Ilfracombe Montelambert sailed to Belfast. Montelamert, Perry, master, had to cut away her masts in a gale of wind at Belfast. She was on her way from Jamaica to Liverpool. By end-April 1796 she had arrived at Liverpool.

Montalembert first appeared in the 1796 volume of Lloyd's Register (LR).

Year	Master	Owner	Trade	Source
1796	Thomas	Hodgson	Liverpool–Jamaica	LR; large repair 1796

Montalambert appeared in the 1800 volume of the Register of Shipping.

Year	Master	Owner	Trade	Source
1800	T.Jump; Thomas	Hodgson	Liverpool–Jamaica; Liverpool–Africa	RS; large repair 1796, and repairs 1799

1st voyage transporting enslaved people (1799–1801): Captain William Thomas sailed from Liverpool on 26 December 1799. In 1799, 156 vessels sailed from an English port, bound for the trade in enslaved people; 134 of these vessels sailed from Liverpool.

Baron Montlambert acquired captives at Cape Mount. On 20 October 1800 she arrived at Suriname with 247 captives. She sailed for Liverpool and arrived at Saint Kitts on 20 January 1801, having suffered damage. She arrived at Liverpool on 14 March. On her way she ran aground on the Hoyle Bank, in Liverpool Bay. She had left Liverpool with 42 crew members and suffered six crew deaths on her voyage.

Year	Master	Owner	Trade	Source
1802	M'Cormick	Hodgson	Liverpool–Africa	RS; large repair 1796, repairs 1799, and large repair 1801

2nd voyage transporting enslaved people (1801–Loss): Captain Alexander Stuart sailed from Liverpool on 12 October 1801. In 1801, 147 vessels sailed from English ports, bound for the trade in enslaved people; 122 of these vessels sailed from Liverpool.

Apparently Captain Stuart was discharged on 5 January 1802. His replacement was Captain William Kermod(e). Baron Montlambert arrived at St Vincent on 13 July 1802. She may have landed 79 captives there.

In August 1802 Lloyd's List reported that Baron Montalambert had arrived at St Vincent from Africa and had sailed for the Bahamas.

== Fate ==
In 1802 Baron Montlambert was wrecked off Crooked Island, Bahamas, with the loss of all on board, including over 300 captives. Reportedly, her captain, first, second, and third officers had all died before she arrived at St Vincent. (Note: However, William Kermod was captain of Nicholson on voyages transporting captives in 1806 and 1807.) She was lost sailing from St Vincent to New Providence.

In 1802, twelve British vessels transporting enslaved people were lost. Five of these were lost while sailing from Africa to the Americas. The loss of Baron Montalembert occurred during the Peace of Amiens. Still, during the period 1793 to 1807, war, rather than maritime hazards or resistance by the captives, was the greatest cause of vessel losses among British vessels transporting enslaved people.

== Bibliography ==
- Inikori, Joseph (1996). "Measuring the unmeasured hazards of the Atlantic slave trade: Documents relating to the British trade". Revue française d'histoire d'outre-mer. 83 (312): 53–92. doi:10.3406/outre.1996.3457.
- Wilkins, Frances (2000). 2,000 Manx Mariners: An Eighteenth Century Survey. Wyre Forest Press. ISBN 9781897725146.
- Williams, Gomer (1897). History of the Liverpool Privateers and Letters of Marque: With an Account of the Liverpool Slave Trade. W. Heinemann.
