= Regalia (1828 ship) =

1828–1831 British merchant ship

History

United Kingdom
- Name: Regalia
- Namesake: Regalia
- Builder: Monkswearmouth, Sunderland
- Launched: 1828
- Fate: Foundered 13 November 1831

General characteristics
- Tons burthen: 303 (bm)

Regalia was launched in Sunderland in 1828. She first appeared in Lloyd's Register (LR) in 1830, with Lotherington, owner and master, and trade London–Trieste. The Register of Shipping for 1830 had the same information, except that it showed her trade as London–Quebec. In 1831, it showed her trade as Antwerp–Liverpool. LR for 1832 showed her trade as Liverpool–Odessa. It also carried the annotation "LOST".

Loss: Regalia, Lotherington, master, foundered on 13 November 1831, in Liverpool Bay off Southport. She was on a voyage from Liverpool to Lisbon, Portugal. Lloyd's List reported on 15 November, that pieces of wreck marked "L.M. Regalia" had washed up at Southport. On the 18th it reported that parts of the wreck were coming on shore.
