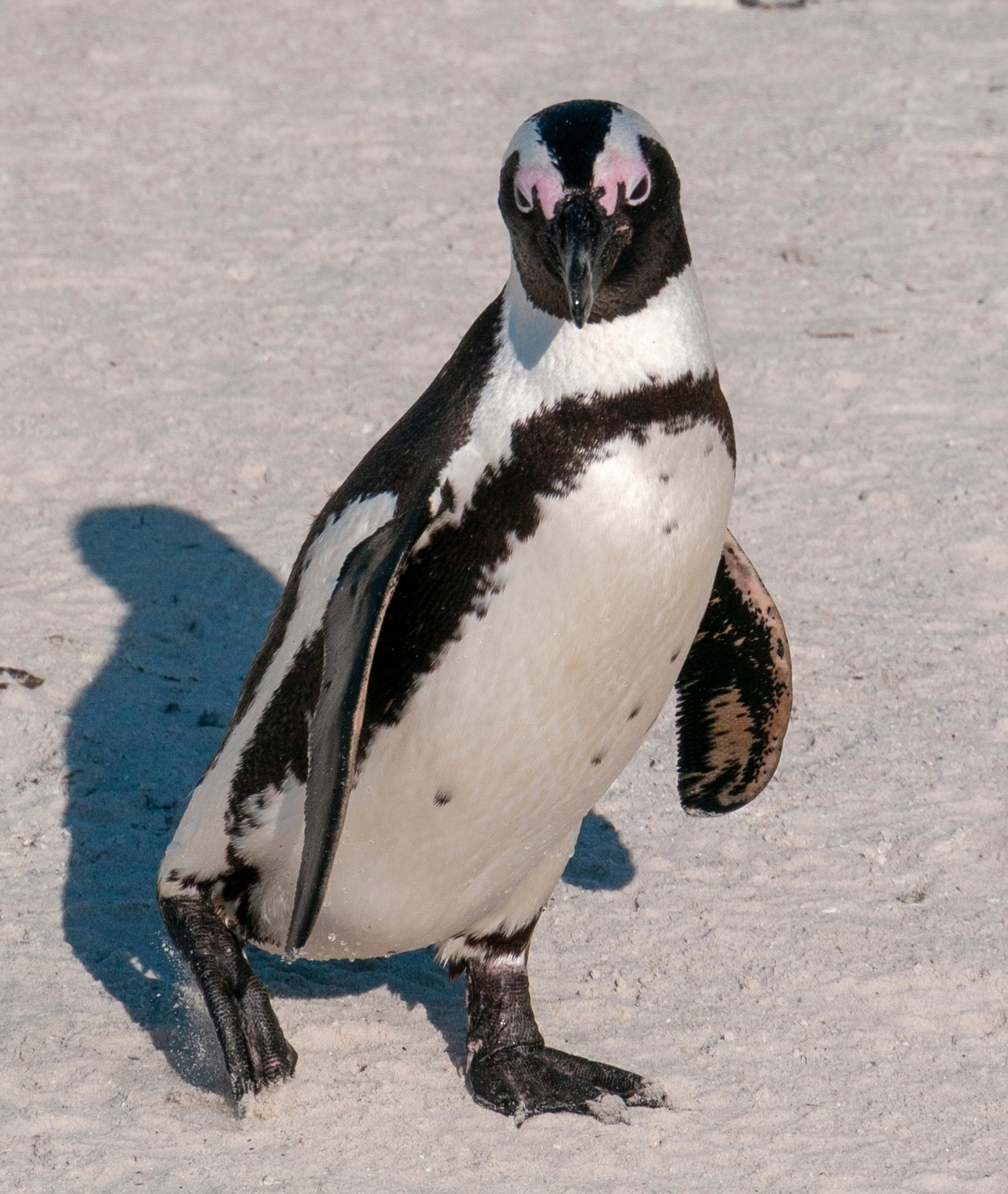
- At Boulders Beach in Simon's Town, South Africa

Conservation status
- Critically Endangered (IUCN 3.1)
- CITES Appendix II

Scientific classification
- Kingdom: Animalia
- Phylum: Chordata
- Class: Aves
- Order: Sphenisciformes
- Family: Spheniscidae
- Genus: Spheniscus
- Species: S. demersus

Binomial name
- Spheniscus demersus (Linnaeus, 1758)
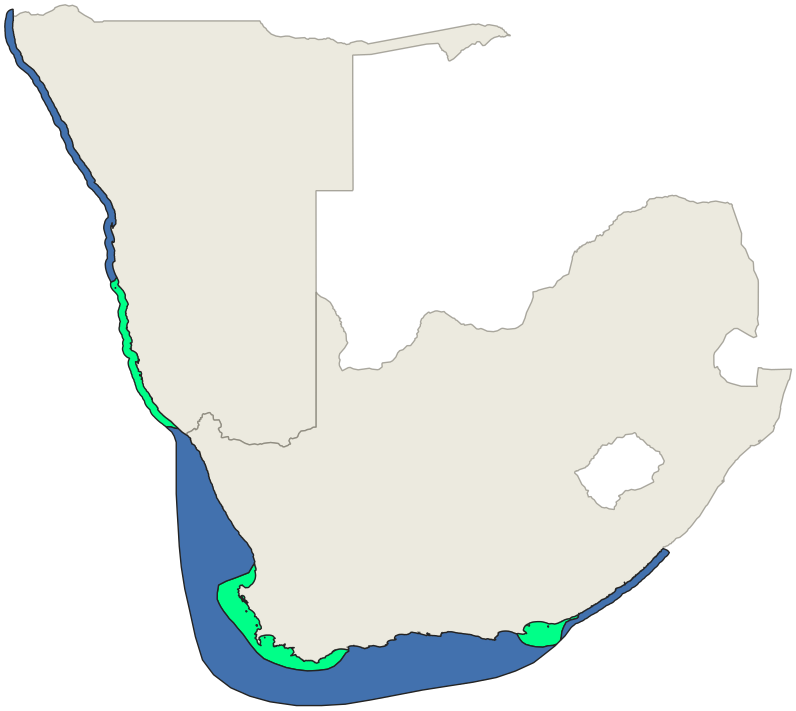
- IUCN range (2024) Extant (resident) Extant (non-breeding)

Synonyms
- Diomedea demersa Linnaeus, 1758

= African penguin =

Species of bird

The African penguin (Spheniscus demersus), also known as the Cape penguin or the South African penguin, is a species of penguin confined to southern African waters. It is the only penguin found in the Old World. Like all penguins, it is flightless, with a streamlined body and wings stiffened and flattened into flippers for a marine habitat. Adults weigh an average of 2.2–3.5 kg (4.9–7.7 lb) and are 60–70 cm (24–28 in) tall. The species has distinctive pink patches of skin above the eyes and a black facial mask. The body's upper parts are black and sharply delineated from the white underparts, which are spotted and marked with a black band.

The African penguin is a pursuit diver and feeds primarily on fish and squid. Once extremely numerous, the African penguin is now the rarest species of penguin, classified as critically endangered, with its population declining rapidly due to a combination of several threats, such as habitat loss, overfishing and climate change. It is a charismatic species and is popular with tourists. Other vernacular names of the species include black-footed penguin and jackass penguin, due to the species' loud, donkey-like noise (although several related species of South American penguins produce the same sound). They can be found along the coast of South Africa and Namibia.

== Taxonomy ==
The English naturalist George Edwards included an illustration and a description of the African penguin in the second volume of his A Natural History of Uncommon Birds in 1747. He used the English name "The Black-Footed Penguins". Edwards based his hand-coloured etching on two preserved specimens that had been brought to London. He suspected that they had been collected near the Cape of Good Hope. In 1758, when the Swedish naturalist Carl Linnaeus updated his Systema Naturae for the tenth edition, he placed the African penguin with the wandering albatross in the genus Diomedea. Linnaeus included a brief description, coined the binomial name Diomedea demersa and cited Edwards' work. The African penguin is now placed with the banded penguins in the genus Spheniscus that was introduced in 1760 by the French zoologist Mathurin Jacques Brisson. The genus name Spheniscus is from Ancient Greek word σφήν (sphēn) meaning "wedge" and is a reference to the animal's thin, wedge-shaped flippers. The specific epithet demersus is Latin meaning "plunging" (from demergere meaning "to sink").

Banded penguins are found mainly in the temperate Southern Hemisphere, with the Humboldt penguin and Magellanic penguin found in southern South America and the Galápagos penguin found in the Pacific Ocean near the equator. All are similar in shape, colour and behaviour.

Penguin colony at Betty's Bay

== Description ==
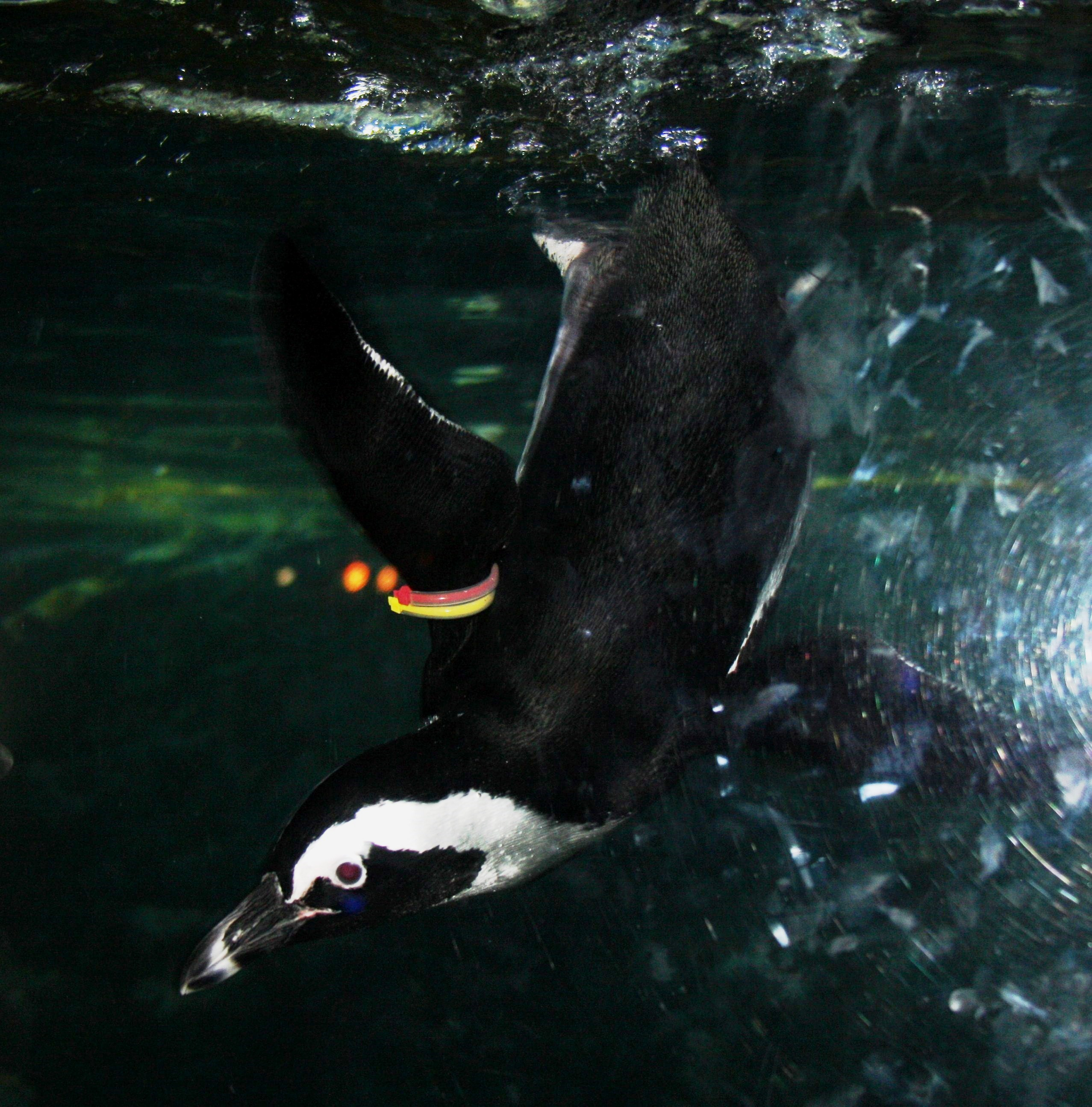
African penguin diving in Siam Center, Bangkok, Thailand

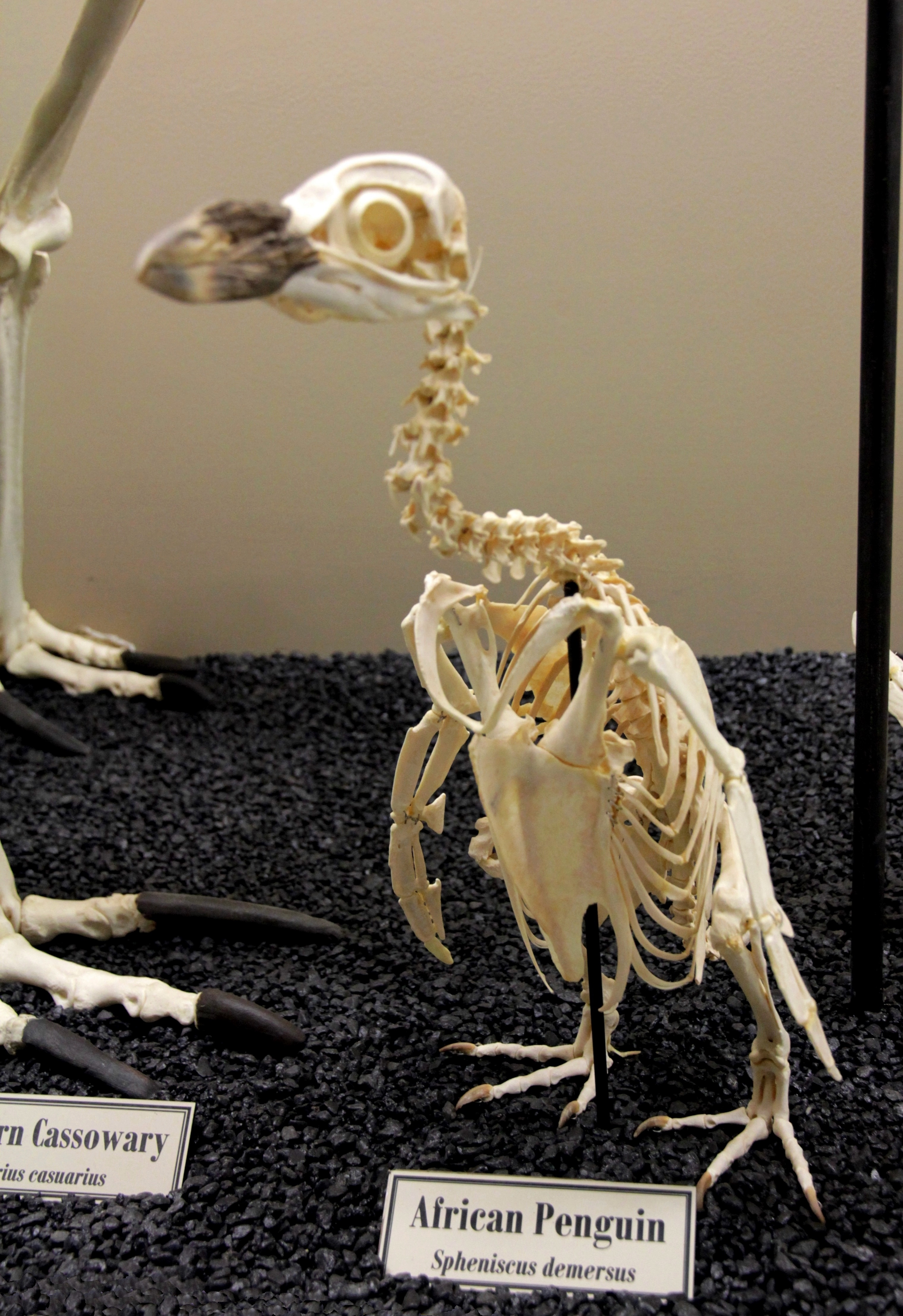
African penguin skeleton at the Museum of Osteology in Oklahoma City, Oklahoma, US

African penguins grow to 60–70 cm (24–28 in) tall and weigh between 2.2–3.5 kg (4.9–7.7 lb). The beak length of the African penguin varies, usually growing between 4.8–6.5 cm (1.9–2.6 in). They have a black stripe and black spots on the chest, the pattern of which is unique to each penguin, like human fingerprints. The sweat glands above the eyes cool the birds' blood and as the temperature rises, increased blood flow causes the glands to get pinker. This species exhibits slight sexual dimorphism; the males are slightly larger than the females and have longer beaks. Juveniles do not possess the bold, delineated markings of the adult, but instead have dark upperparts that vary from greyish-blue to brown; the pale underparts lack both spots and the band. The beak is more pointed than that of the Humboldt penguin. The African penguin's colouring is a form of protective colouration known as countershading. The white undersides of the birds are difficult to spot by predators under the water and the penguins' black backs blend in with the water when viewed from above. African penguins possess supraorbital salt glands located above the eyes that allow them to excrete excess salt from ingesting seawater, an adaptation that helps maintain osmotic balance while foraging at sea.

African penguins resemble and are related to the Humboldt, Magellanic and Galápagos penguins. African penguins have a very recognisable appearance, with a thick band of black that is in the shape of an upside-down horseshoe. They have black feet and black spots that vary in size and shape between individuals. Magellanic penguins share a similar bar marking that often confuses the two; the Magellanic has a double bar on the throat and chest, whereas the African has a single bar. These penguins are sometimes called "jackass penguins", which comes from the loud braying noises they make.

== Distribution ==
The African penguin is found on the southern and southwestern coast of Africa, living in colonies on 27 islands between Namibia and Algoa Bay, near Port Elizabeth, South Africa. It is the only penguin species that breeds in Africa, and its presence gave name to the Penguin Islands.

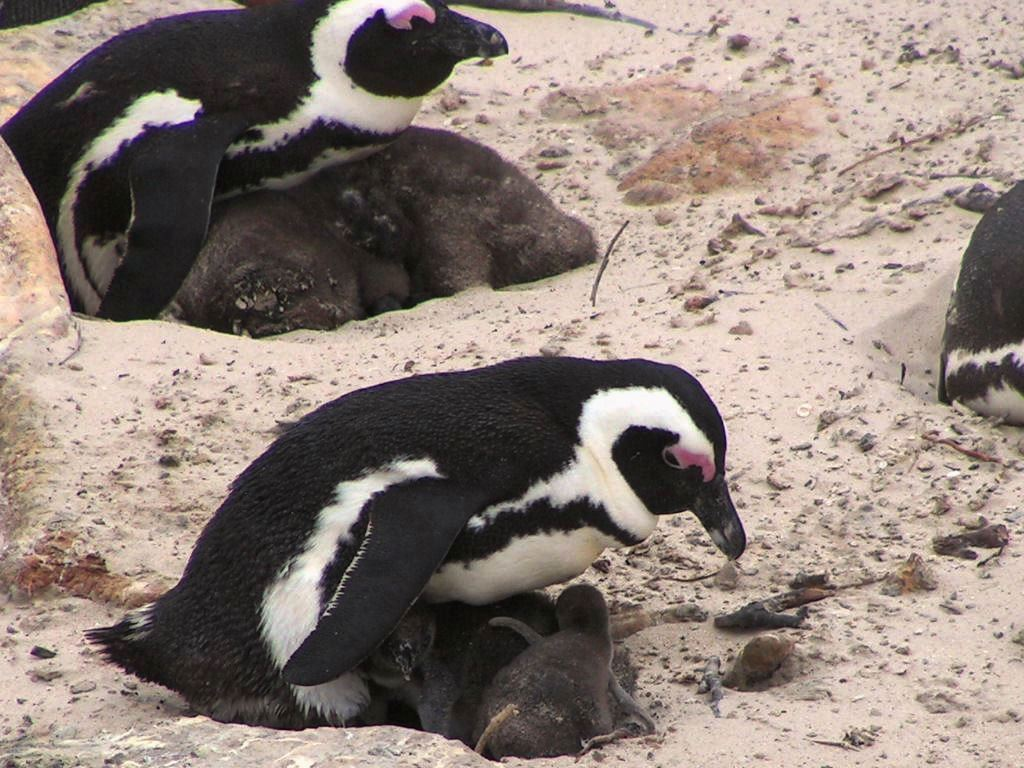
Two adults with chicks at the Boulders Beach colony in South Africa

Two colonies were established by penguins in the 1980s on the mainland near Cape Town, namely Boulders Beach near Simon's Town and Stony Point in Betty's Bay. Mainland colonies likely became possible only in recent times due to the reduction of predator numbers, although the Betty's Bay colony has been attacked by leopards. The only other mainland colony is in Namibia, but it is not known when it was established.

Boulders Beach is a tourist attraction due to the beach, swimming, and the penguins themselves. The penguins will allow people to approach them as close as a meter.

Breeding populations of African penguins are being kept in numerous zoos worldwide. No colonies are known outside the southwestern coast of Africa, although vagrants (mostly juveniles) may occasionally be sighted beyond the normal range.

=== Population ===
Roughly 4 million African penguins existed at the beginning of the 19th century. Of the 1.5 million African penguins estimated in 1910, only some 10% remained at the end of the 20th century. African penguin populations, which breed in Namibia and South Africa, have declined by 95% since pre-industrial times.

Today, breeding is largely restricted to 24 islands from Namibia to Algoa Bay, South Africa, with the Boulders Beach colony being an exception to this rule. The total population fell to approximately 150,000–180,000 in 2000. Of those, 56,000 belonged to the Dassen Island colony and 14,000 to the Robben Island colony. The colony at Dyer Island in South Africa fell from 46,000 in the early 1970s to 3,000 in 2008.

In 2008, 5,000 breeding pairs were estimated to live in Namibia.

In 2010, the total African penguin population was estimated at 55,000. At the rate of decline seen from 2000 to 2010, the African penguin was expected to be extinct in the wild by 2026.

In 2012, about 18,700 breeding pairs were estimated to live in South Africa, with the majority on St. Croix Island in Algoa Bay.

The total breeding population across both South Africa and Namibia fell to about 20,850 pairs in 2019 and further declined to below 10,000 pairs in 2023. At this point the species was reclassified as critically endangered, with the suggestion that it would become functionally extinct in about 2035 if the current trajectory continued. Despite expert recommendations for immediate and wide-ranging closures of breeding areas to fishing, the South African government chose to merely retain a number of previously instituted trial closures that had been shown to be largely ineffective. In response, SANCOBB and BirdLife South Africa together with the Biodiversity Law Centre launched a landmark litigation to revise the decision, based on invoking the government's constitutional obligation to prevent extinction of an endangered species. On 18 March 2025, prior to the court hearing, a settlement was reached in which the Ministry set aside its earlier decision and decreed the establishment of a set of larger and full-time no-fishing zones around six key breeding areas.

== Behaviour ==
=== Diet ===
African penguins forage in the open sea, where they feed on pelagic fish such as sardines (including the blue pilchard), South African mullet, Cape horse mackerels, red-eye round herrings and anchovies (specifically the European anchovy and the Southern African anchovy) and marine invertebrates such as squids (Loligo reynaudi) and small crustaceans, primarily krills, shrimps and Pterygosquilla armata. Penguins normally swim within 20 km (12 mi) of the shore. A penguin may consume up to 540 grams (1.19 lb) of prey every day, but this may increase to over 1 kg (2.2 lb) when raising older chicks.

Due to the marked decline of sardines in the waters near its habitat, African penguins' diet has shifted towards anchovies to some extent, although available sardine biomass is still a notable determinant of penguin population development and breeding success. While a diet of anchovies appears to be generally sufficient for the penguins, it is not ideal due to anchovies' lower concentrations of fat and protein. The species' diet changes throughout the year; as in many seabirds, it is believed that the interaction of diet choice and breeding success helps the penguins maintain their population size. Although parent penguins are protective of their chicks, they will not incur nutritional deficits themselves if food is scarce and hunting requires a greater time or energy commitment. This may lead to higher rates of brood loss under poor food conditions.

When foraging, African penguins carry out dives that reach an average depth of 25 m (82 ft) and last for 69 seconds, although a maximum depth of 130 m (430 ft) and duration of 275 seconds has been recorded.

=== Breeding ===
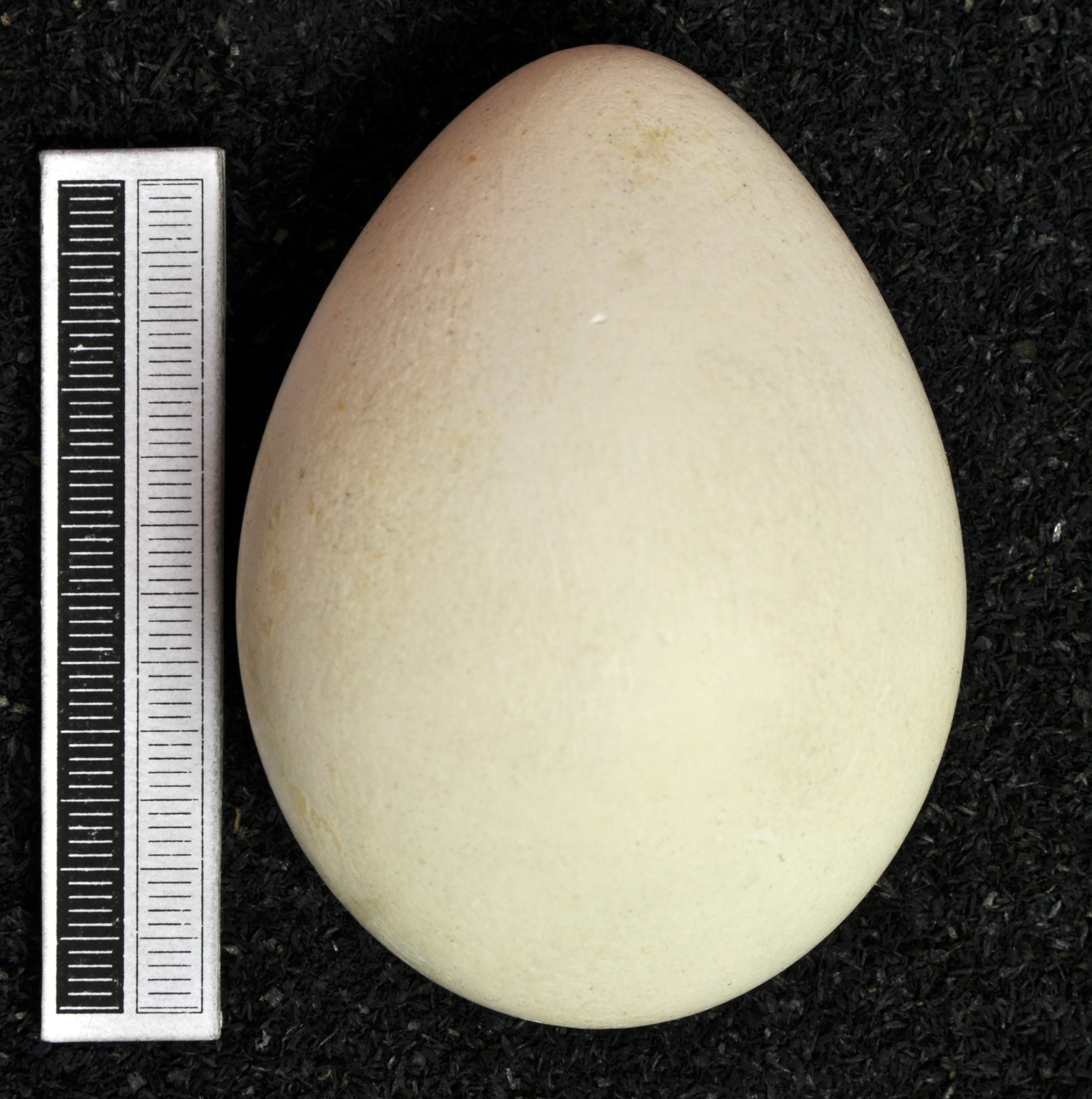
Egg from the collection of Museum Wiesbaden, Wiesbaden, Hesse, Germany

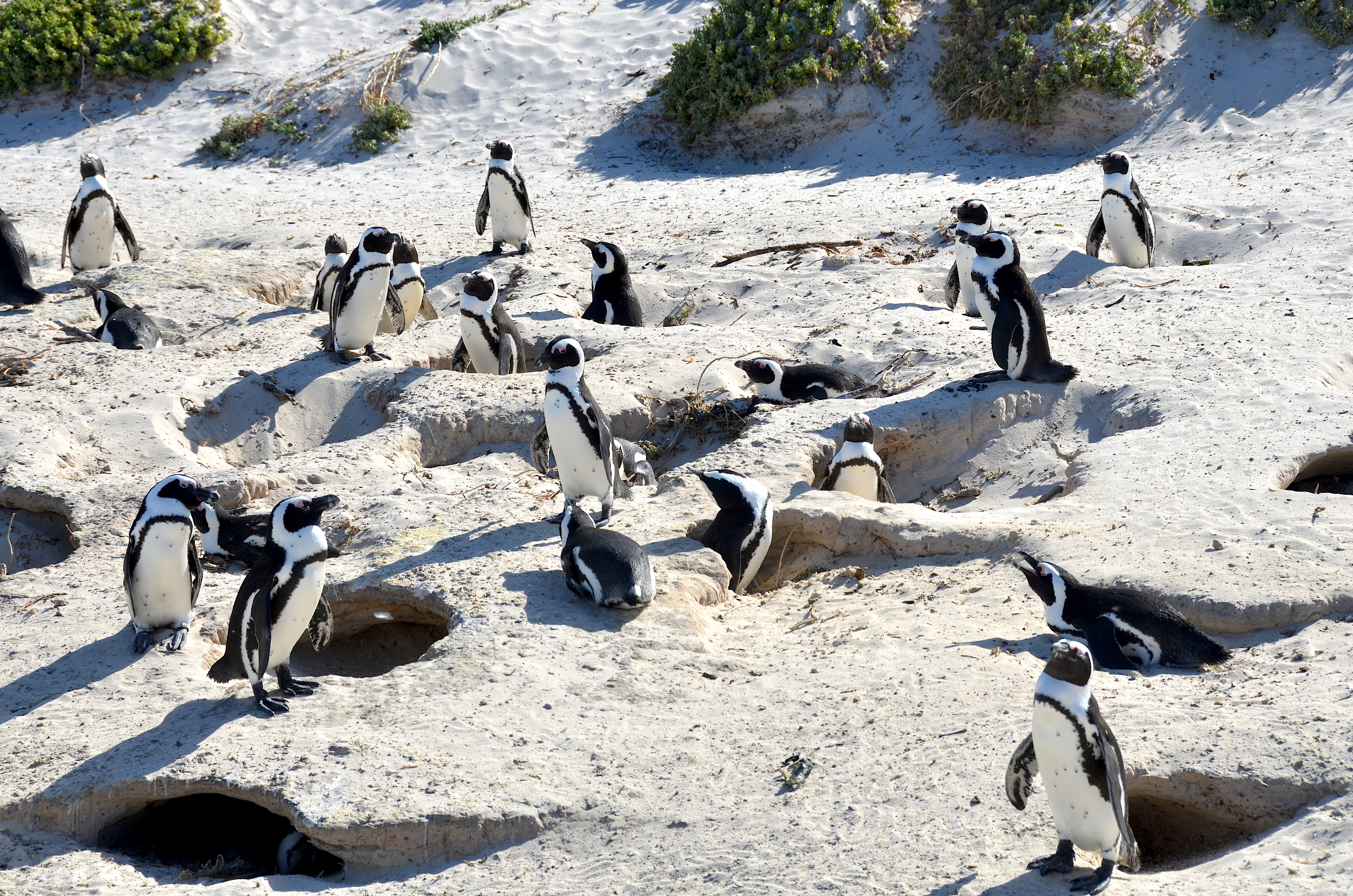
Nesting burrows of the African penguin, Boulders Beach (2017)

The African penguin is monogamous; it breeds in colonies and pairs return to the same site each year. It has an extended breeding season, with nesting usually peaking from March to May in South Africa and November to December in Namibia. A clutch of two eggs is laid either in burrows burrowed in guano or nests in the sand under boulders or bushes. Incubation is undertaken equally by both parents for around 40 days. At least one parent guards the chicks for about one month, whereafter the chicks join a crèche with other chicks and both parents spend most of the day foraging in the sea.

Chicks fledge at 60 to 130 days, the timing depending on environmental factors such as the quality and availability of food. The fledged chicks then go to sea on their own, where they spend the next one to nearly two years. They then return to their natal colony to moult into adult plumage.

When penguins moult, they are unable to forage in the sea as their new feathers are not yet waterproof. Therefore, they fast over the entire moulting period. African penguins typically take around three weeks to moult and lose about half of their body weight by using up their fat reserves in the process.

Breeding success depends strongly on local prey abundance. Birds at the Robben island colony were found lay larger eggs, breed earlier, and produce more fledglings when food availability was high.

African penguins spend most of their lives at sea until it comes time for them to lay their eggs. Females remain fertile for about 10 years. Due to high predation on the mainland, African penguins will seek protection on offshore islands, where they are safer from larger mammals and natural challenges. These penguins usually breed during the winter when temperatures are cooler. African penguins often will abandon their eggs if they become overheated in the hot sun and abandoned eggs never survive the heat. The eggs are three to four times bigger than chicken eggs. Ideally, the eggs are incubated in a burrow dug into the guano layer (which provides suitable temperature regulation), but the widespread human removal of guano deposits has rendered this type of nest unfeasible in many colonies. Humans mined guano for fertilizer. To compensate, penguins burrow holes in the sand, nest under rocks or bushes or make use of nest boxes if they are provided. The penguins spend three weeks on land caring for their offspring, after which chicks may be left alone during the day while the parents forage. The chicks are frequently killed by predators or succumb to the hot sun. Parents usually feed hatchlings during dusk or dawn.

Artificial nest boxes providing shelter from temperature extremes and predators were trialled on Robben Island, and birds using them were found to have higher chick survival rates than those using open nests.

In 2015, when foraging conditions were favourable, more male than female African penguin chicks were produced in the colony on Bird Island. Male chicks also had higher growth rates and fledging mass and therefore may have higher post-fledging survival than females. This, coupled with higher adult female mortality in this species, may result in a male-biased adult sex ratio and may indicate that conservation strategies benefiting female African penguins may be necessary.

=== Predation ===
The average lifespan of an African penguin is 10 to around 25 years in the wild and up to 34 in captivity.

The primary predators of African penguins at sea include sharks and fur seals. Predators of nesting penguins and their chicks include kelp gulls, Cape genets, mongooses, caracals and domestic cats and dogs. Mortality from terrestrial predators is higher if penguins are forced to breed in the open, in the absence of suitable burrows or nest boxes.

== Threats and conservation ==
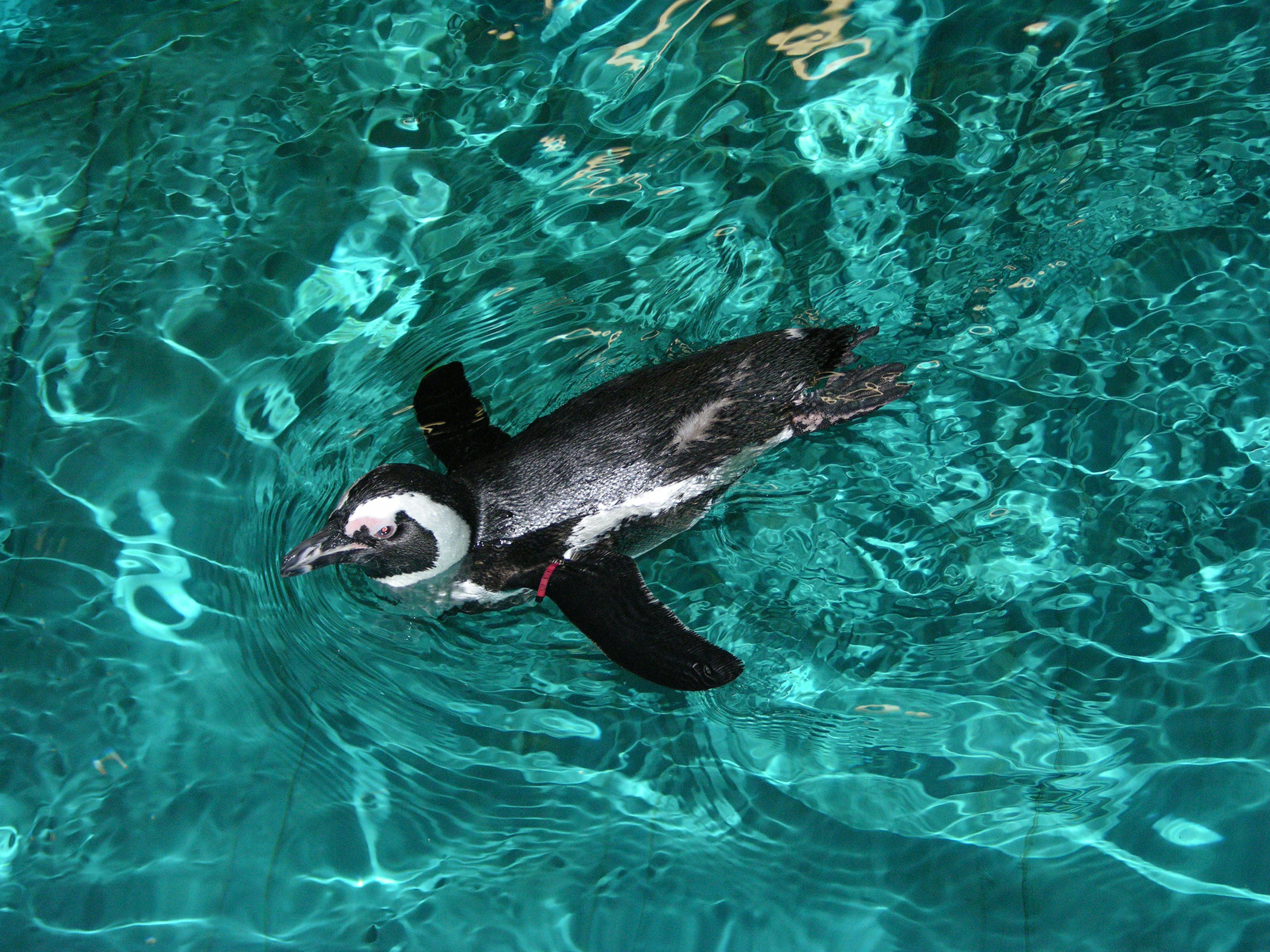
African penguin at the New England Aquarium, Boston, Massachusetts, United States

(video) African penguin swims in an aquarium in Tokyo, Japan

=== Historical exploitation ===
African penguin eggs were considered a delicacy and were still being eaten and collected for sale as recently as the 1970s. In the 1950s, they were being collected from Dassen Island and sold in nearby towns. In 1953, 12,000 eggs were collected. In the late 1950s, some French chefs expressed interest in recipes including African penguin eggs collected from the islands off the west coast of South Africa and placed annual orders for small quantities. In the mid-1960s, eggs were collected in the thousands and sold by the dozen, with each customer limited to two dozen eggs in total.

The practice of collecting African penguin eggs involved smashing those found a few days before a collecting effort to ensure that only freshly laid eggs were sold. This added to the drastic decline of the African penguin population around the Cape coast, a decline which was hastened by the removal of guano from islands for use as fertiliser, eliminating the burrowing material used by penguins.

=== Oil spills ===
Penguins remain susceptible to pollution of their habitat by petrochemicals from spills, shipwrecks and cleaning of tankers while at sea. Accounts of African penguins impacted by oil date back to the 1930s. African penguins' exposure to oil spills is both chronic (higher frequency small discharges of oil at sea) and acute (rare maritime disasters where large volumes of oil are released in a single event). Penguins of many species have been impacted by oil spills across the southern hemisphere.

In 1948, the tanker Esso Wheeling sank, subsequently oiling and killing thousands of penguins of the Dyer Island colony. In 1953, dead penguins were among a range of dead birds, fish and other marine life that washed ashore after the tanker Sliedrecht was holed and spilled oil near Table Bay. In 1971, the SS Wafra oil spill impacted the African penguin colony of Dyer Island. In 1972, oil spilt following the Oswego-Guardian and Texanita collision oiled roughly 500 penguins. In 1975, newspapers reported that oil pollution from shipwrecks and the pumping of bilges at sea had killed tens of thousands of African penguins. At the time, the Dassen Island colony was being passed by 650 oil tankers each month because the Suez Canal had become blocked with wrecked vessels, thus increasing maritime traffic past the Cape of Good Hope.

In 1979, an oil spill prompted the collection and treatment of 150 African penguins from St. Croix Island near Port Elizabeth. The animals were later released at Robben Island and four of them promptly swam back to St. Croix Island, surprising scientists.

In 1983, the exposure of penguins of Dassen Island to the oil slick from the Castillo de Bellver was also a topic of concern given the penguins' conservation status at the time, but owing to the prevailing wind and current, only gannets were oiled.

==== 1994 MV Apollo Sea disaster ====
African penguin casualties were significant following the sinking of the MV Apollo Sea and a subsequent oil slick in 1994. 10,000 penguins were collected and cleaned, of which less than half survived.

==== 2000 MV Treasure crisis ====
Disaster struck on 23 June 2000, when the iron ore tanker MV Treasure sank between Robben Island and Dassen Island, South Africa. It released 400–1,000 tonnes (390–980 long tons; 440–1,100 short tons) of fuel oil, causing an unprecedented coastal bird crisis and oiling 19,000 adult penguins at the height of the best breeding season on record for this vulnerable species. The oiled birds were brought to an abandoned train repair warehouse in Cape Town to be cared for. An additional 19,500 un-oiled penguins were removed from Dassen Island and other areas before they became oiled and were released about 800 kilometres east of Cape Town. This gave workers enough time to clean up the oiled waters and shores before the birds could complete their long swim home (which took the penguins between one and three weeks). Some of the penguins were named and radio-tracked as they swam back to their breeding grounds. Tens of thousands of volunteers helped with the rescue and rehabilitation process, which was overseen by the International Fund for Animal Welfare (IFAW) and the South African Foundation for the Conservation of Coastal Birds (SANCCOB) and took more than three months to complete. This was the largest animal rescue event in history of a single species; more than 91% of the penguins were successfully rehabilitated and released – an amazing feat that could not have been accomplished without such a tremendous international response.

Due to the positive outcome of African penguins being raised in captivity after tragedies such as the Treasure oil spill, the species is considered a good "candidate for a captive-breeding programme which aims to release offspring into the wild"; however, worry about the spread of new strains of avian malaria is a major concern in the situation.

Bringing the birds inland led to the exposure of penguins to parasites and disease vectors such as mosquitoes carrying avian malaria, which has caused 27% of the rehabilitated penguin deaths annually.

==== 2016 & 2019 Port of Ngqura ====
Small-scale oil spills (of less than 400 litres (110 US gal)) have occurred at the Port of Ngqura since bunkering activities started there in 2016. Bunkering is a ship refuelling process that can result in oil spills and oil slicks entering the water. Hundreds of African penguins have been harmed following these spills due to the port's close proximity to penguin rookeries on St. Croix Island and seabird habitat on neighbouring Jahleel and Brenton Islands.

=== Competition with fisheries ===
The population collapse in the 2000s appears to be largely due to the decrease of food availability, principally sardines and anchovy stocks. Commercial fisheries of these fish have forced these penguins to search for prey farther offshore, as well as having to switch to eating less nutritious prey. Restricting commercial fishing near colony sites such as Robben Island for short periods (3 years) was shown to markedly improve penguin breeding success. Longer closure periods and closures near other colonies are being evaluated.

Fishing pressure and climate variability have engendered major ecological changes in the Benguela system. African penguins are highly sensitive to any type of decline in sardine and anchovies. Current food availability is considered to now limit colonies to relatively small sizes.

=== Cape fur seal predation ===
Sustained conservation efforts to increase the number of Cape fur seals are thought to have contributed to the decline of African penguin populations. In Namibia, breeding colonies have been decimated by the predation of "rogue" Cape fur seals on African penguins. Penguins on Dyer Island in South Africa face the same threat. Conservationists consider culling of seals near breeding colonies as an effective recourse. Observational results from Mercury Island indicate that seal culling led to an increase in the population of penguins.

=== Conservation status ===
The African penguin is one of the species to which the African-Eurasian Waterbird Agreement (AEWA) applies. In September 2010, it was listed as endangered under the US Endangered Species Act. As of 2024, the African penguin is listed as critically endangered on the IUCN Red List, with the remaining mature individuals around 19,800 birds in a declining population.

=== Mediation efforts ===
Many organisations such as SANCCOB, Dyer Island Conservation Trust, SAMREC, The National Aviary in Pittsburgh, and Raggy Charters with the Penguin Research Fund in Port Elizabeth are working to halt the decline of the African penguin. Measures include: monitoring population trends, hand-rearing and releasing abandoned chicks, establishing artificial nests and proclaiming marine reserves in which fishing is prohibited. Some colonies (such as on Dyer Island) are suspected to be under heavy pressure from predation by Cape fur seals and may benefit from the culling of individual problem animals, which has been found effective (although requiring a large amount of management effort) in trials.

Established in 1968, SANCCOB is currently the only organisation mandated by the South African government to respond to crises involving seabirds along South Africa's coastline and is internationally recognised for the role it played during the MV Treasure oil spill. A modelling exercise conducted in 2003 by the University of Cape Town's FitzPatrick Institute of African Ornithology found that rehabilitating oiled African penguins has resulted in the current population being 19% larger than it would have been in the absence of SANCCOB's rehabilitation efforts.

In February 2015, the Dyer Island Conservation Trust opened the African Penguin and Seabird Sanctuary (APSS) in Gansbaai, South Africa. The centre was opened by then-Department of Tourism minister Derek Hanekom and will serve as a hub for seabird research carried out by the Dyer Island Conservation Trust. The centre will also run local education projects, host international marine volunteers and seek to improve seabird handling techniques and rehabilitation protocols.

== Captivity ==
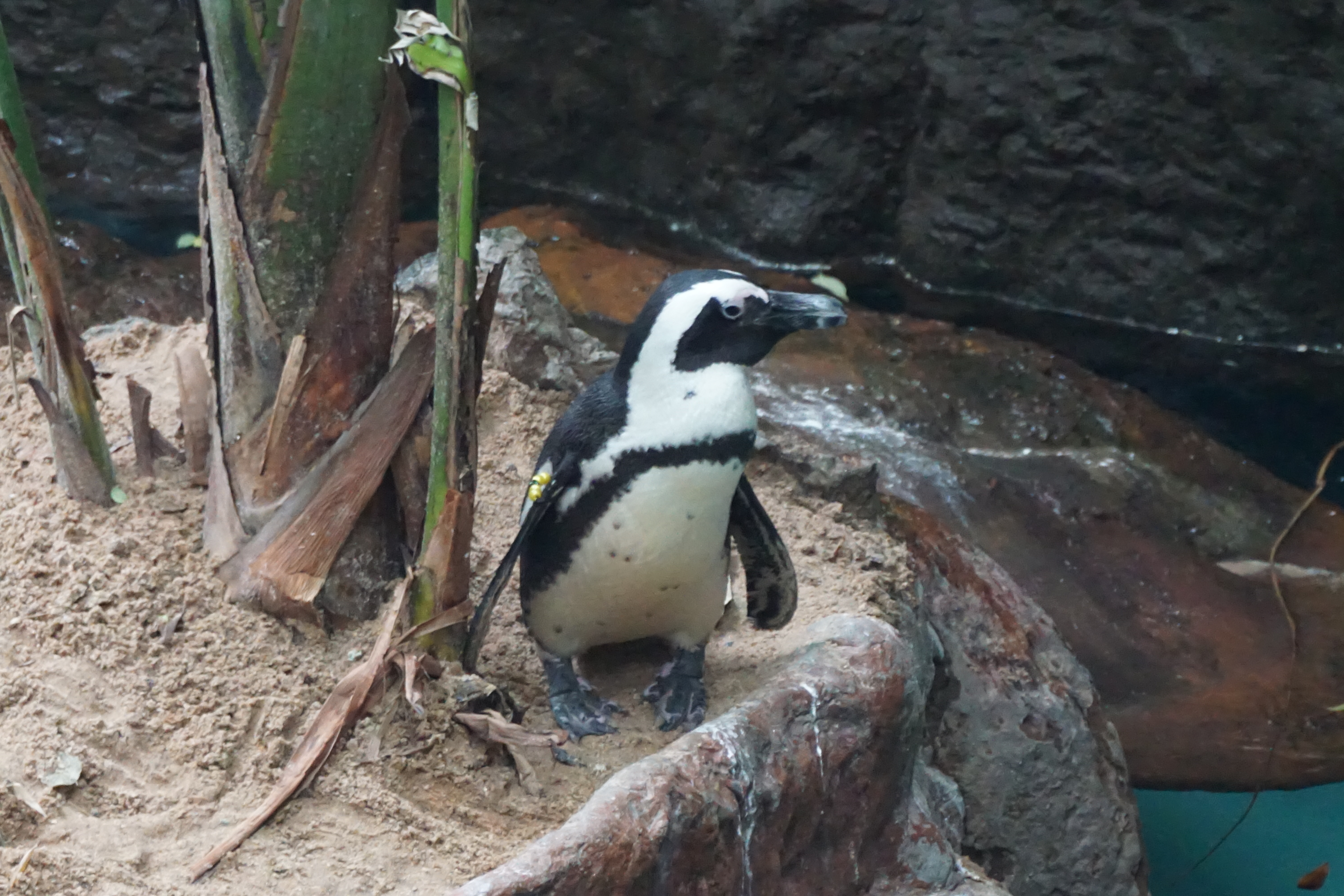
African penguin at the Dallas World Aquarium, Dallas, Texas, United States

African penguins are a commonly seen species in zoos across the world. Because they do not require particularly low temperatures, they are often kept in outside enclosures. They adapt fairly well to this captive environment and are rather easy to breed compared to other species of the family. In Europe, the breeding programme EAZA is regulated by Artis Royal Zoo in the Netherlands, whilst in the United States the SSP program is cooperatively managed by the AZA. The idea is to create a backup captive population, as well as to aid in the conservation of the population in its natural habitat. Between 2010 and 2013, American zoos spent $300,000 on in situ (wild population) conservation.

== See also ==
- Endangered species
- Wildlife of South Africa

== Gallery ==
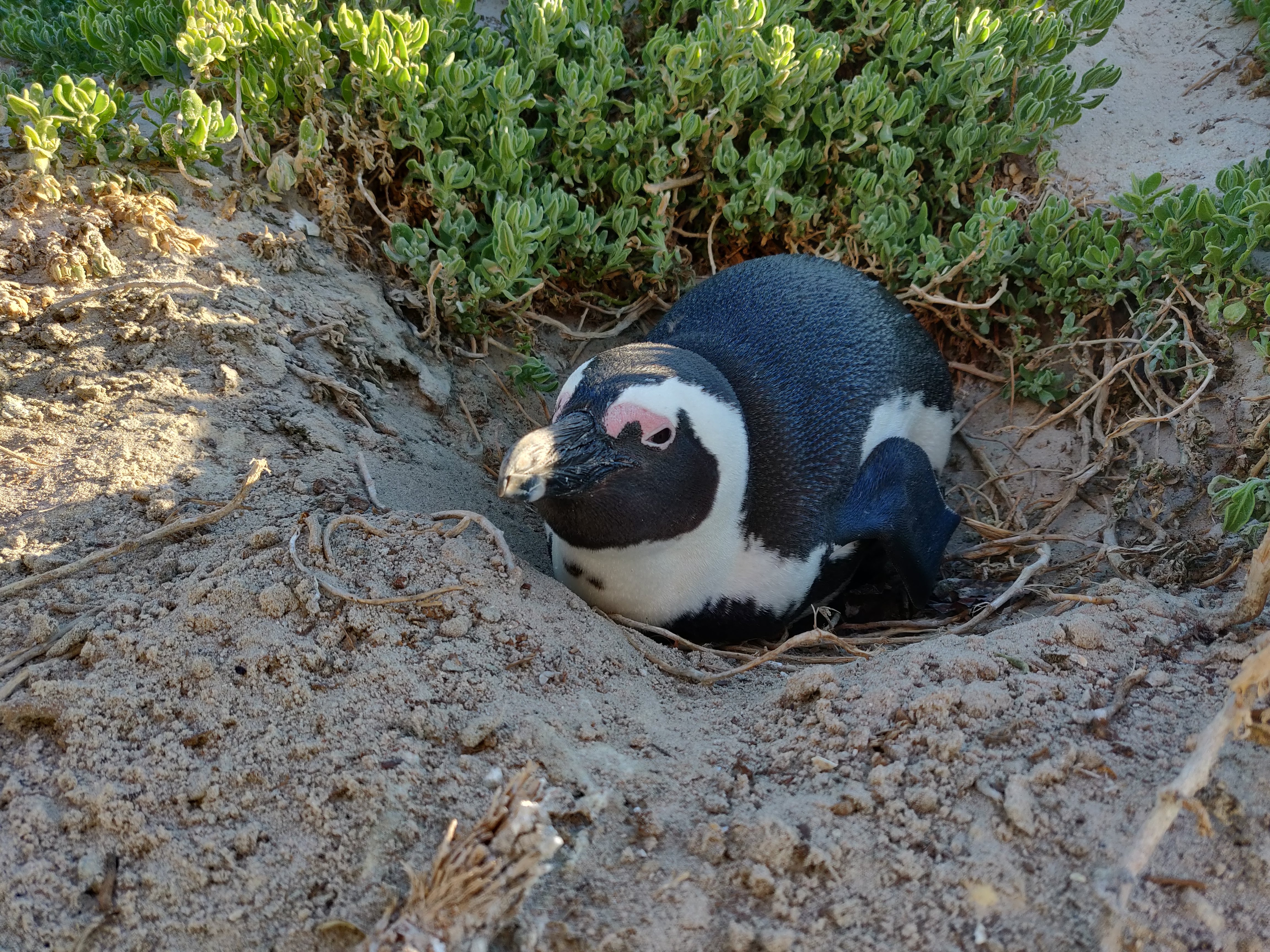
Nesting African penguin

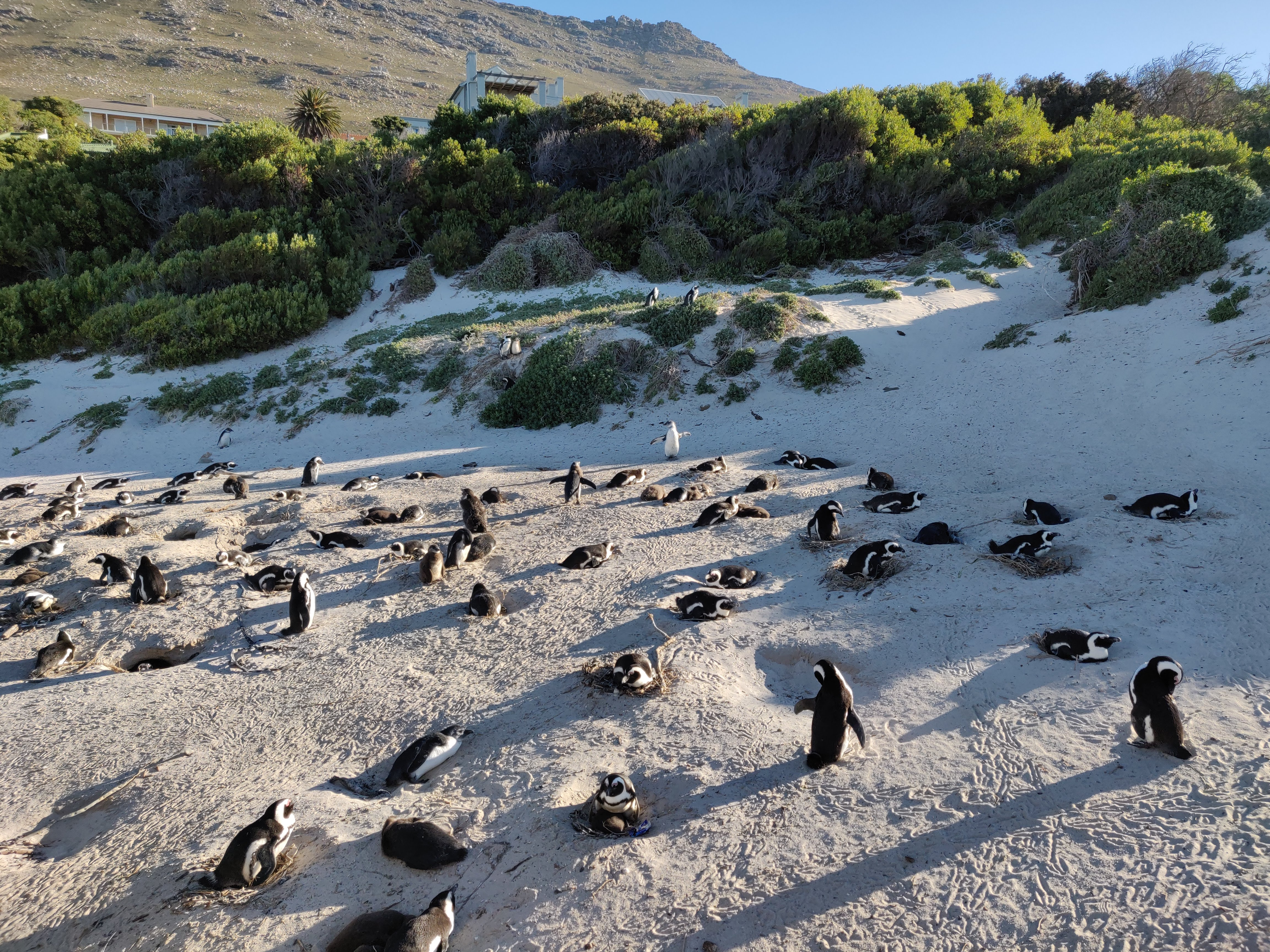
Colony of African penguins nesting on Boulders Beach in Cape Town

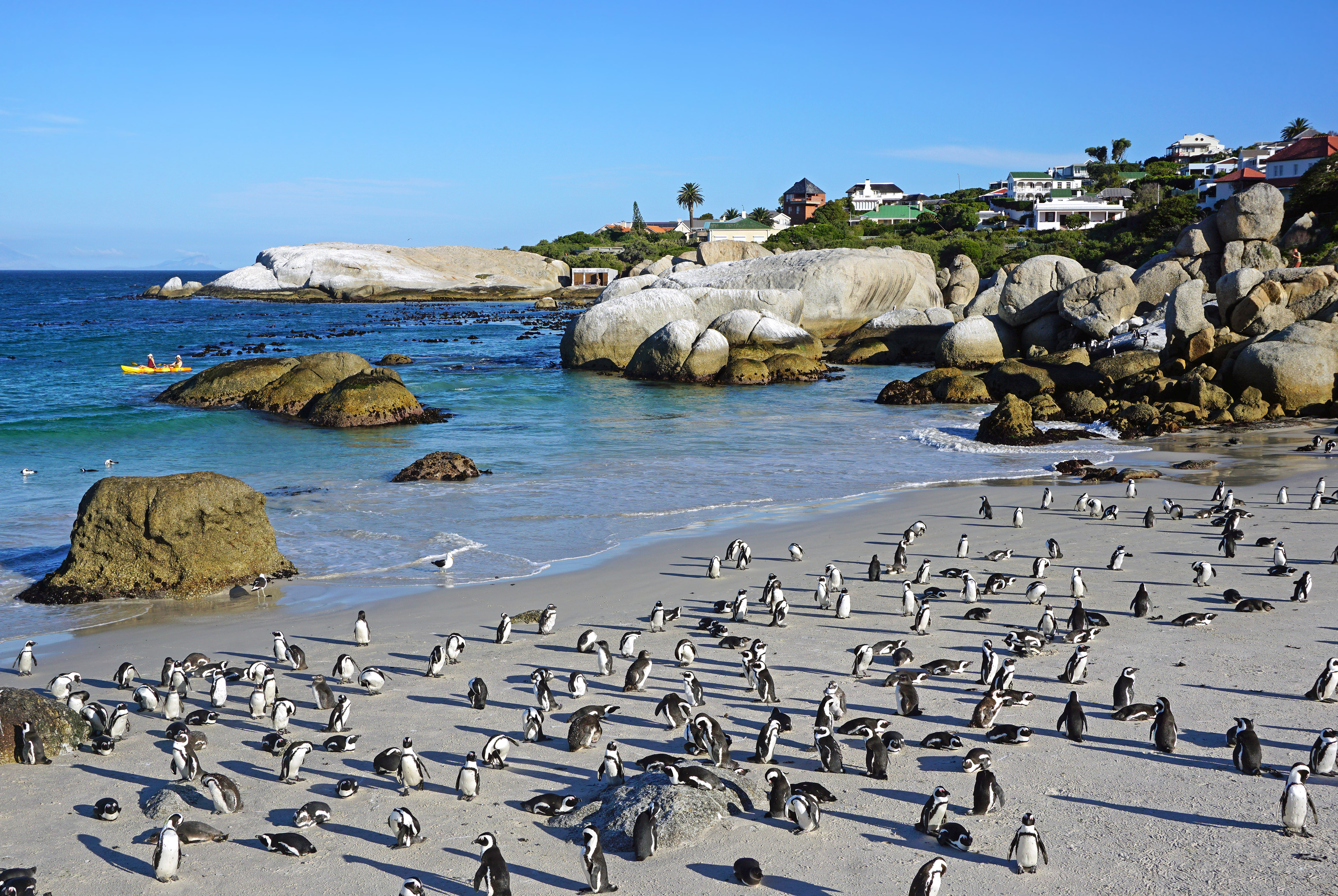
African penguins on Boulders Beach

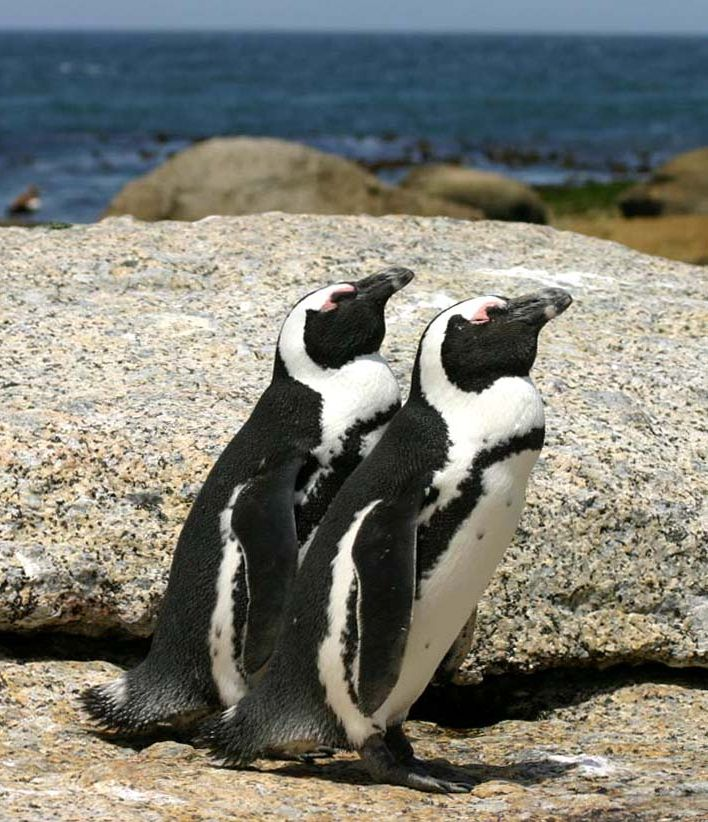
African penguins on a rock at Boulders Beach

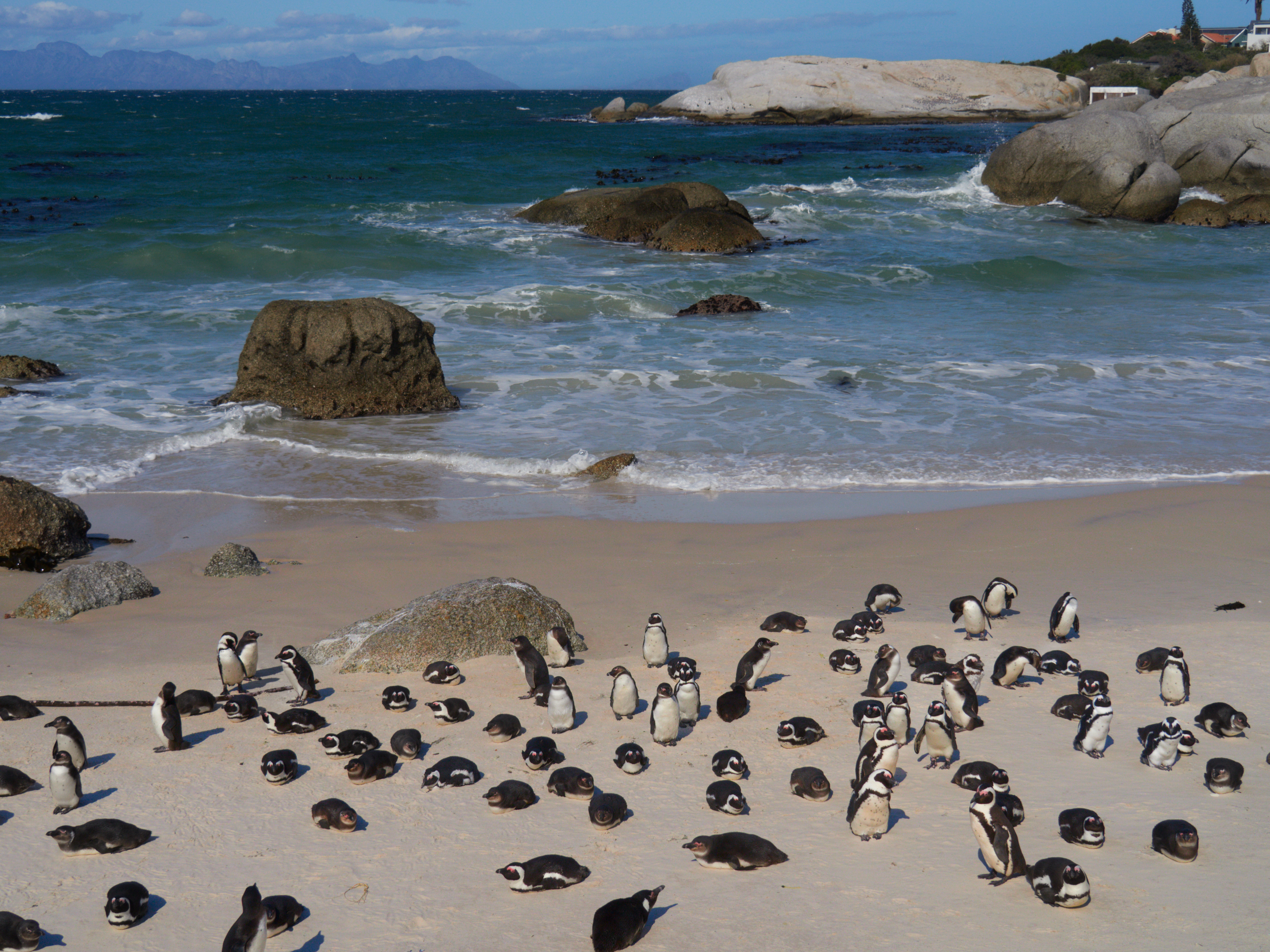
A colony of African penguins (Spheniscus demersus) resting and standing on the sandy shore at Boulders Beach.

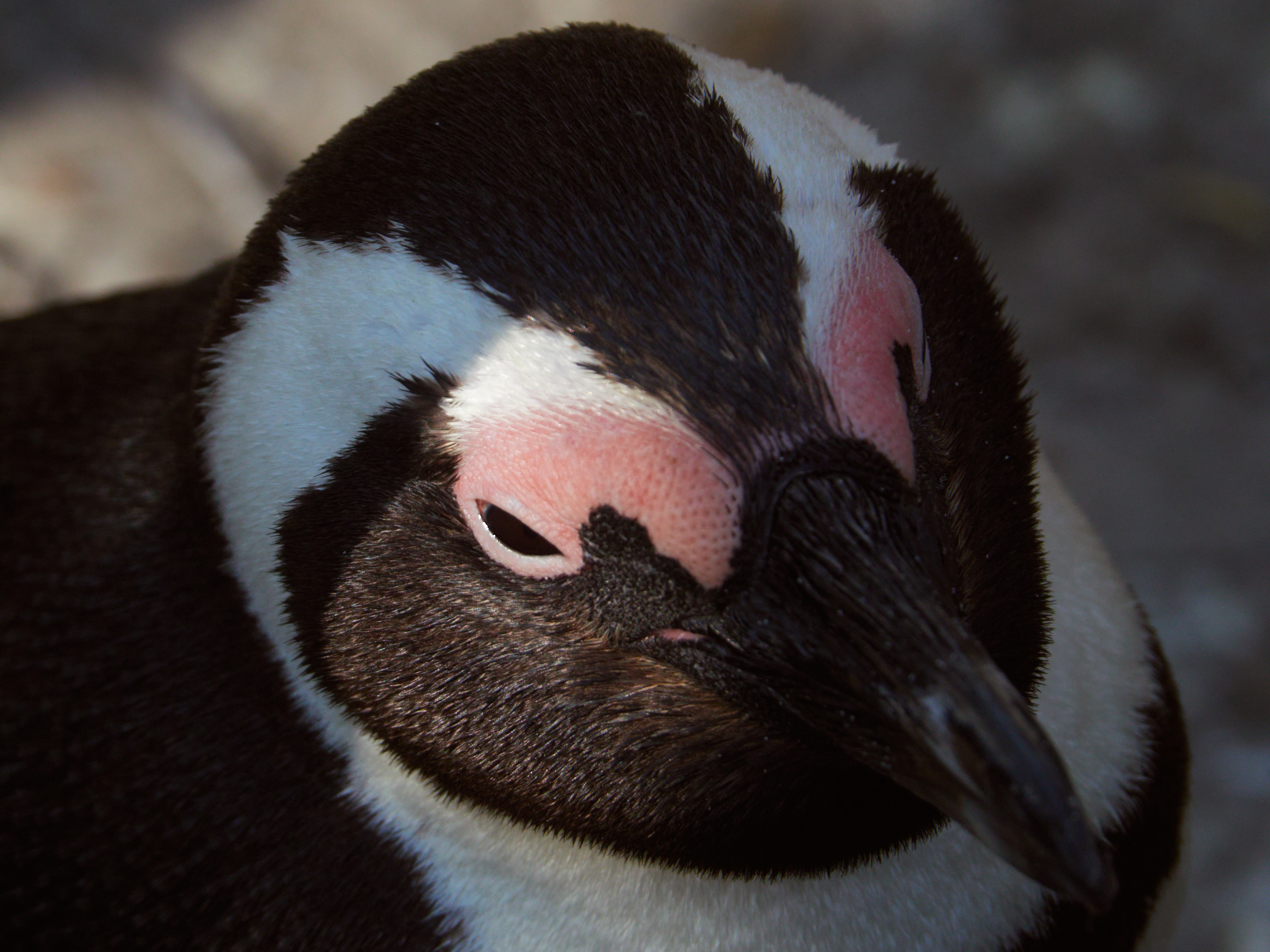
Close-up portrait, showing the sweat gland.

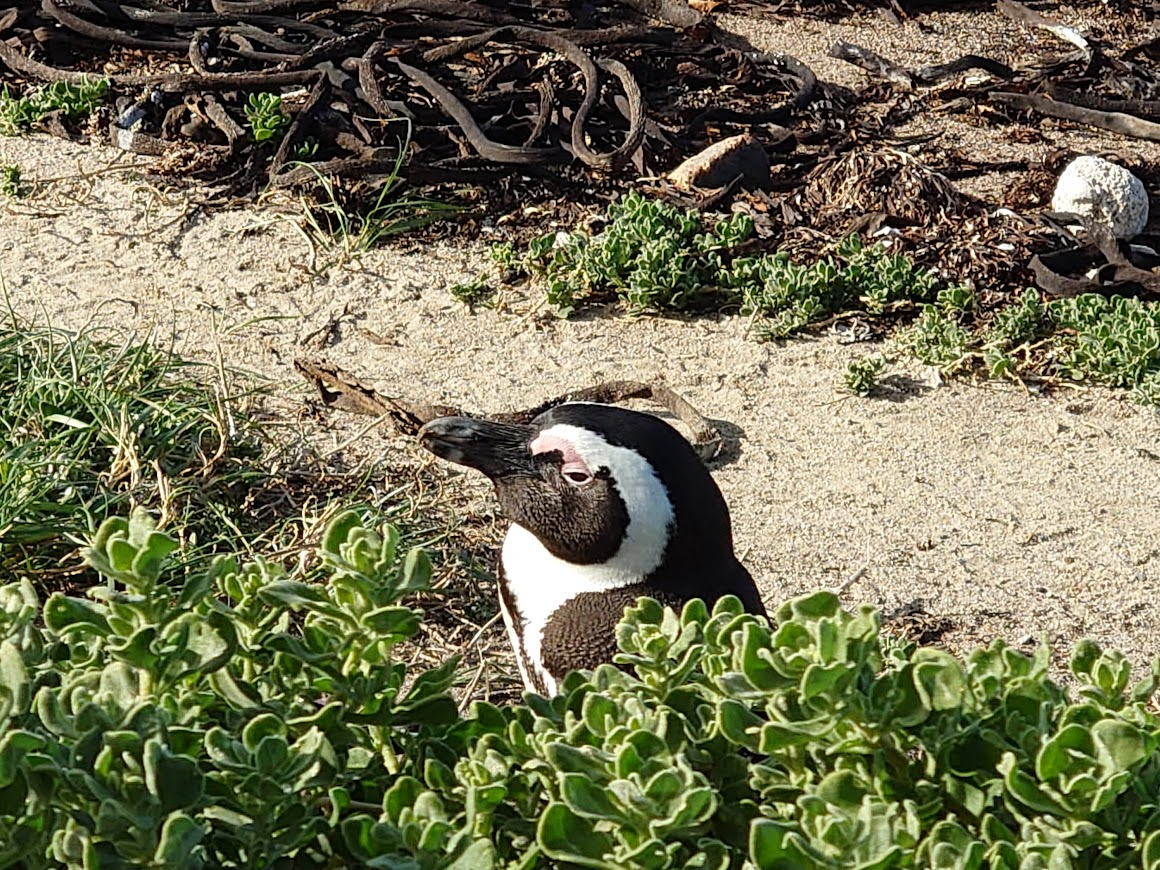
African penguin part of the Betty's Bay colony

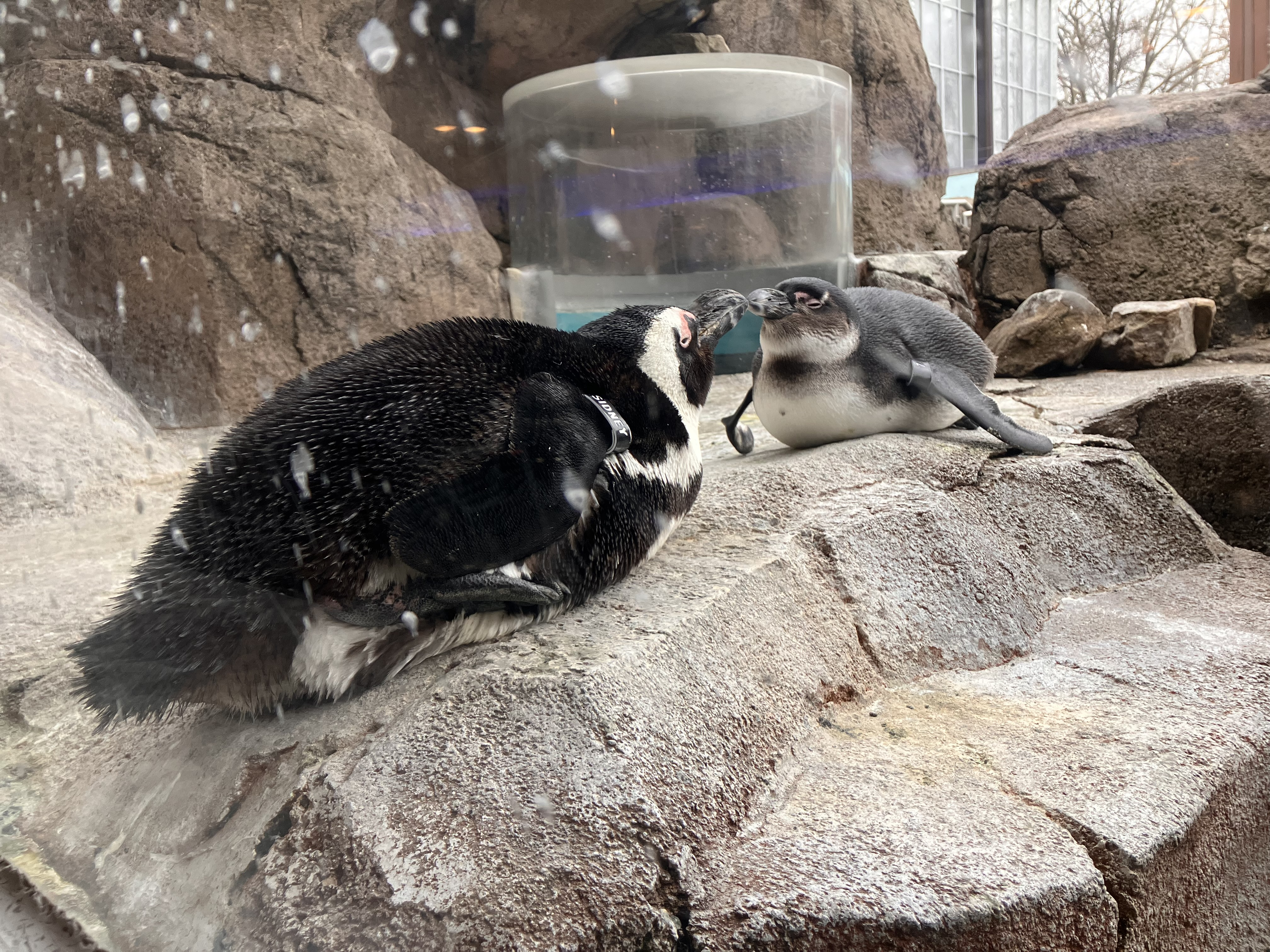
Adult (front) and juvenile (back)

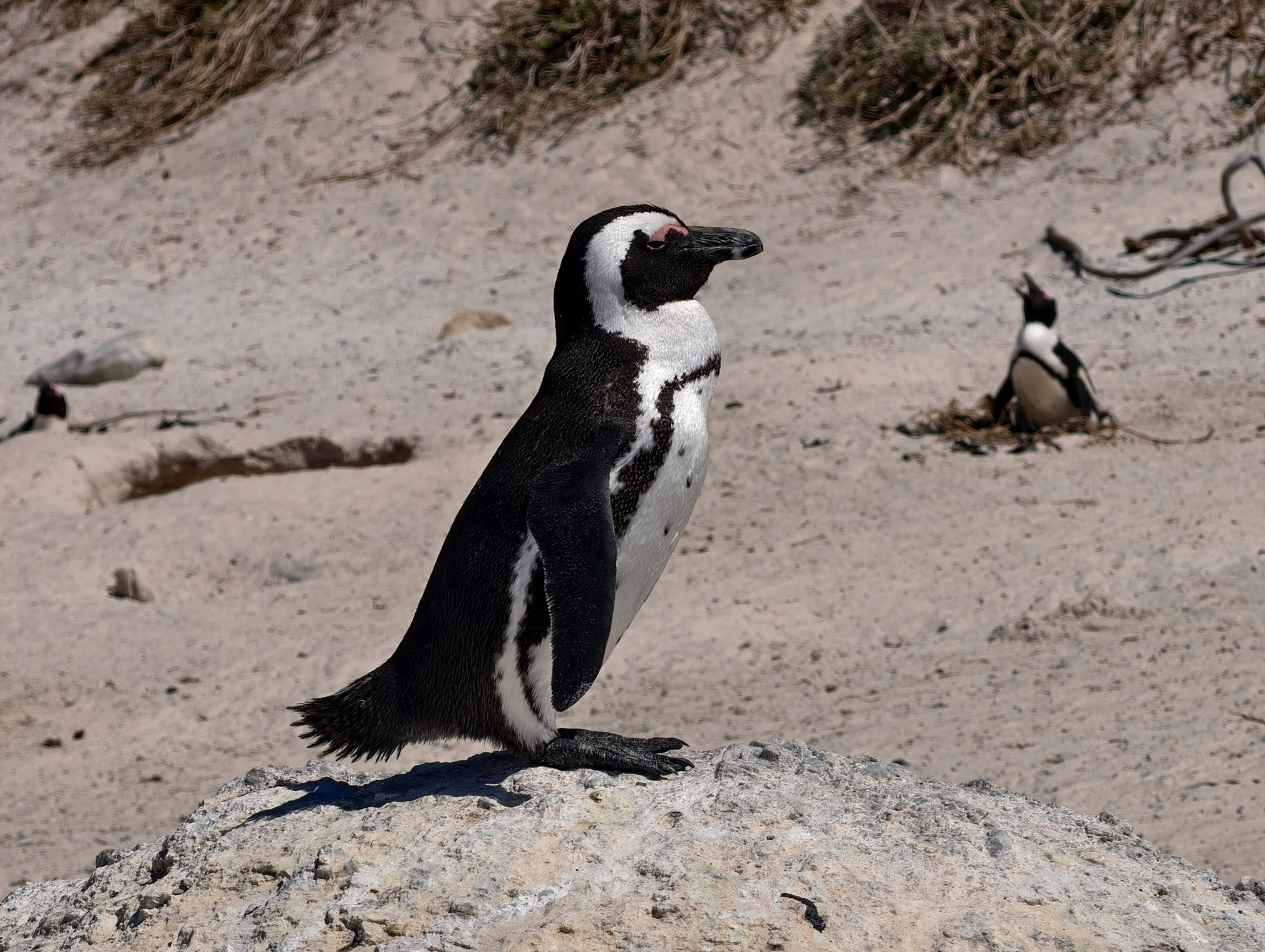
African penguin at Boulders Beach, Simon's Town, South Africa

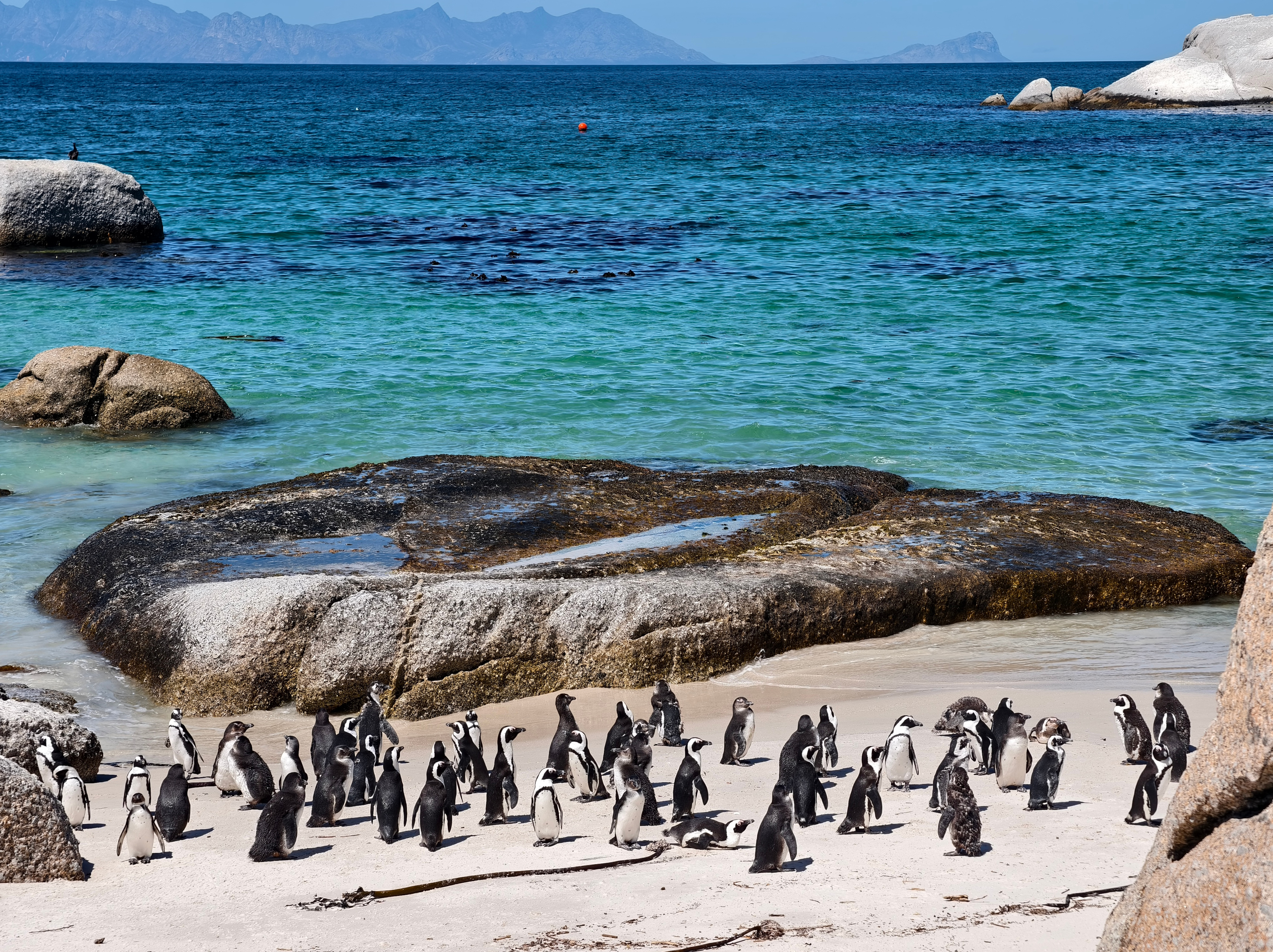
African penguin colony at Boulders Beach in Simon's Town, South Africa

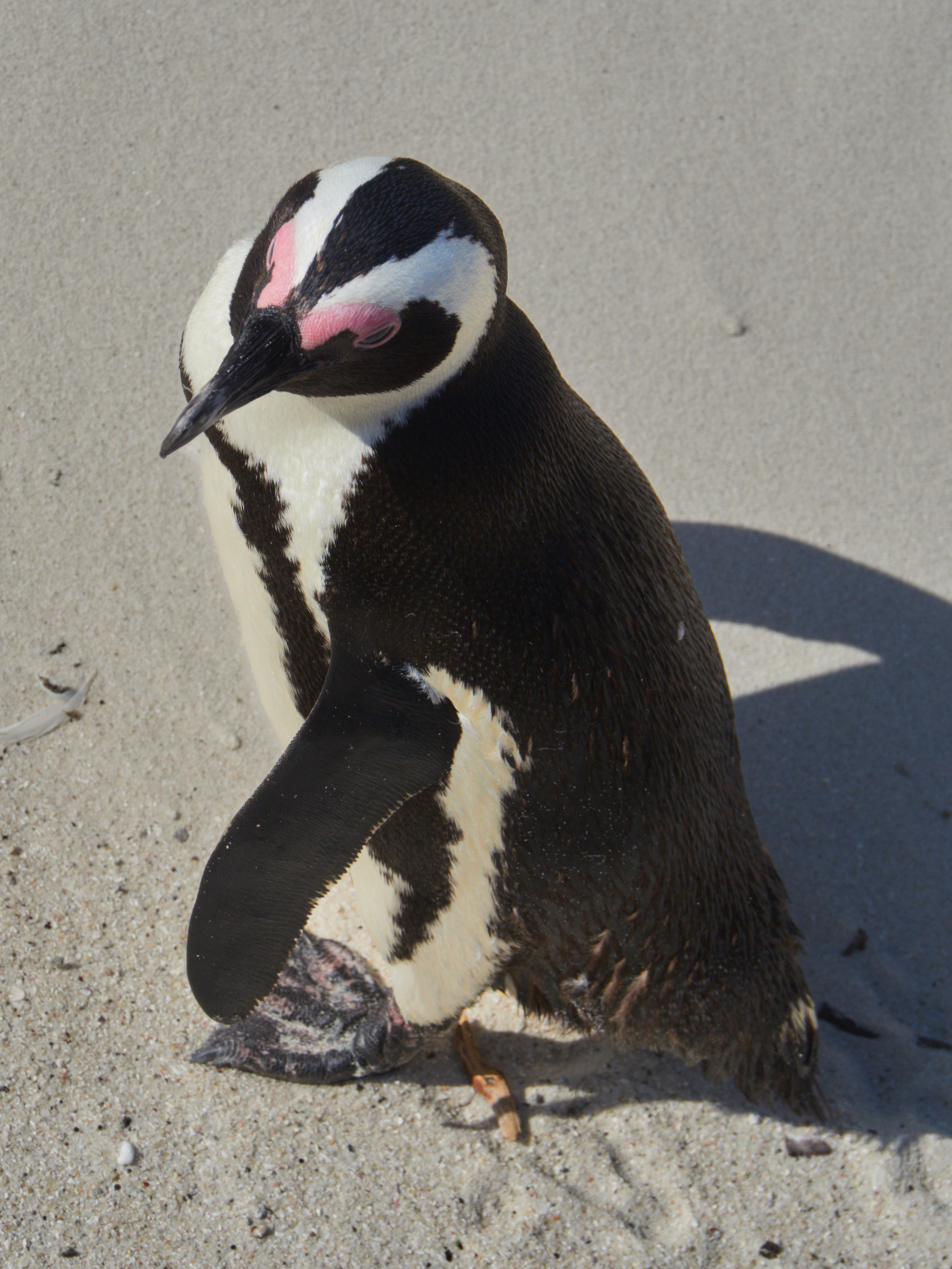
An African penguin (Spheniscus demersus) resting on the sand at Boulders Beach.

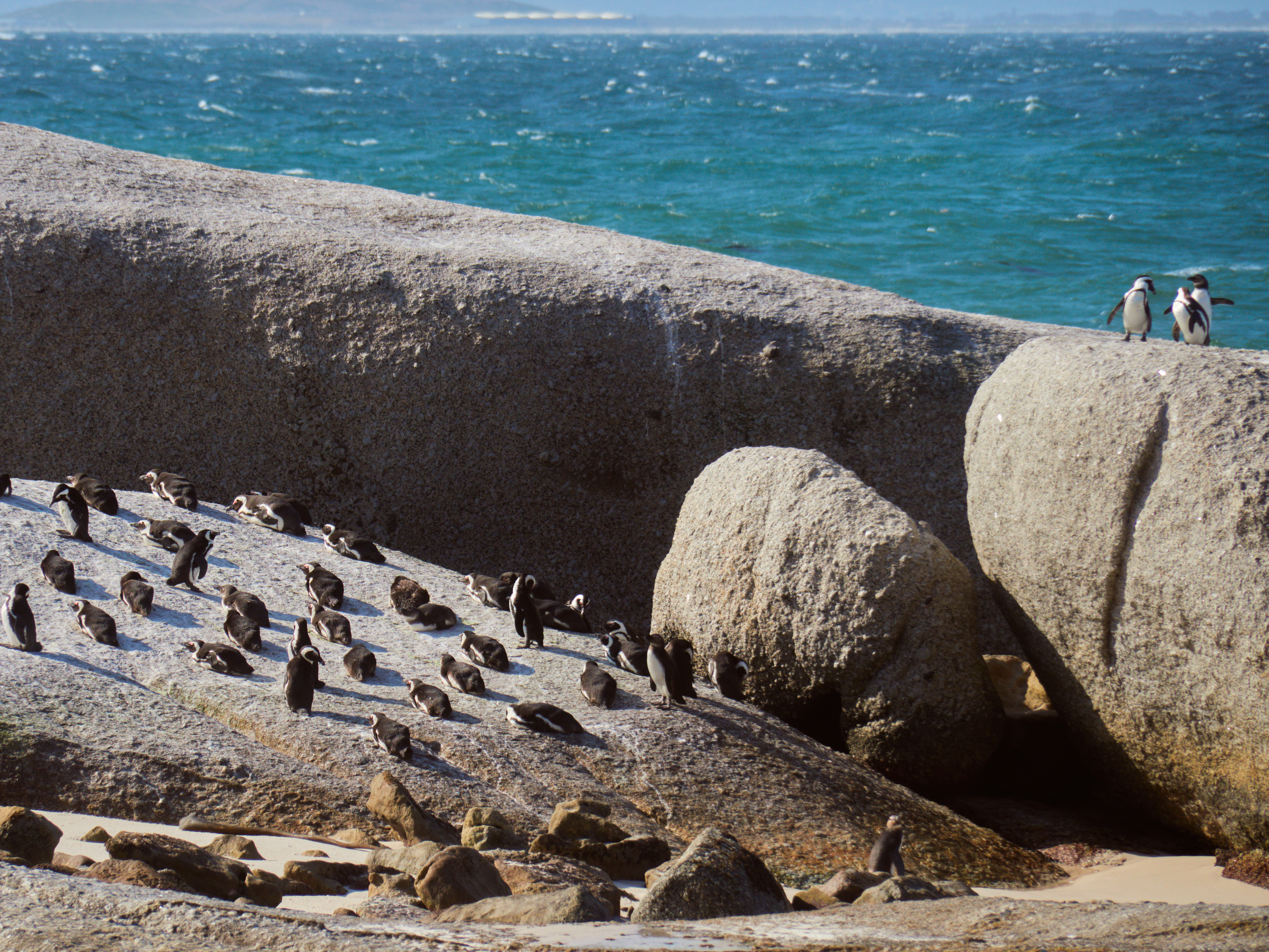
A colony of African penguins resting and standing on granite boulders at Boulders Beach.
