= St. Croix Island (Algoa Bay) =

Island in South Africa

St. Croix Islands
- Location within Eastern Cape

Geography
- Location: Indian Ocean
- Coordinates: 33.80853°S 25.73719°E

Administration
- South Africa

St. Croix Island is the largest of three islands in Algoa Bay, South Africa, located within 8 kilometres of the Port of Nqgura. The islands are of critical importance to sea bird populations, including the endangered African penguin.

== St. Croix Island ==
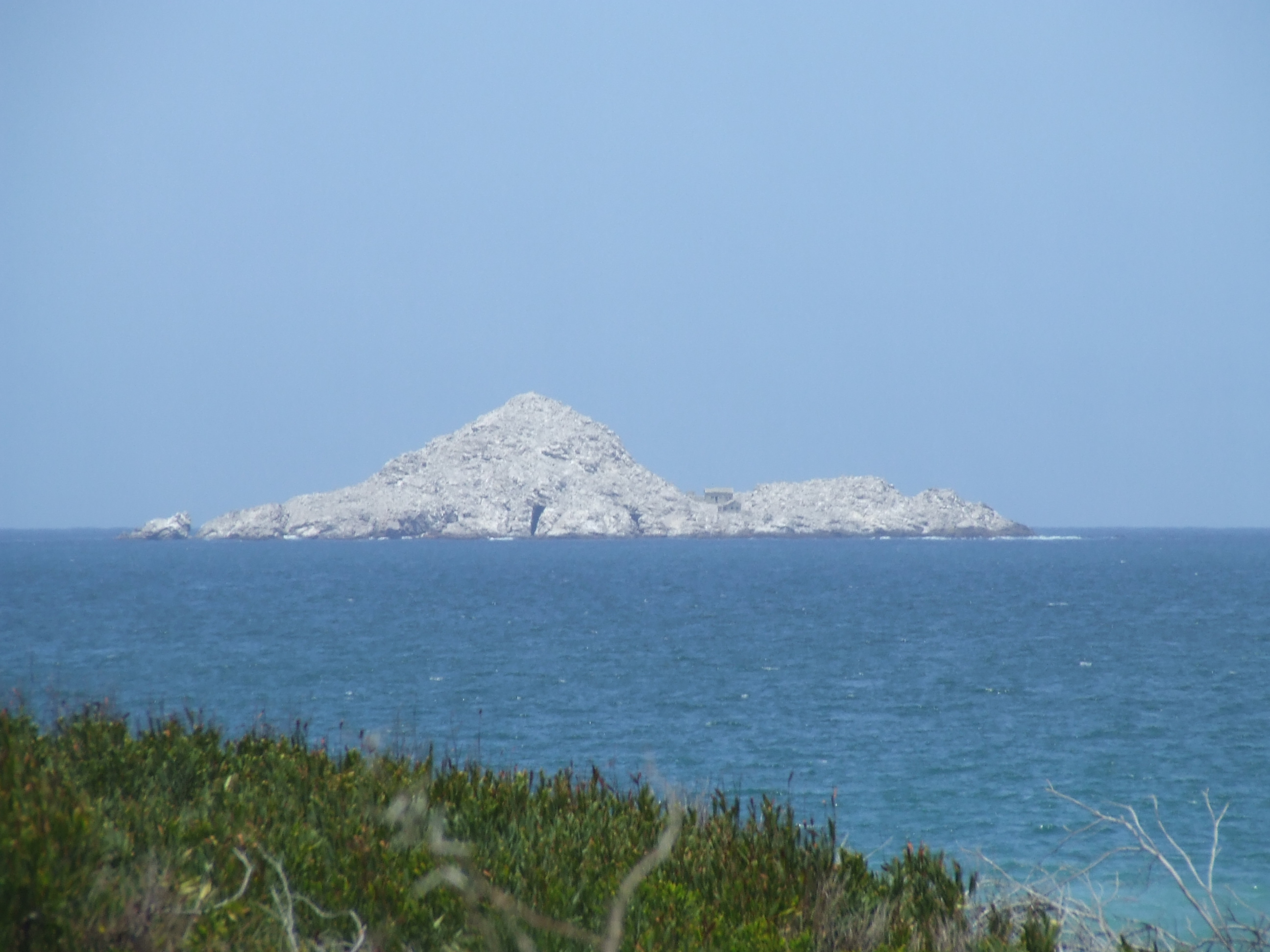
St. Croix Island seen from the nearest landfall at Hougham Park, just east of the Coega harbour development. From here the island is about 4 km to sea. Two disused stone bungalows, used by guano collectors and then by the University of Port Elizabeth for research purposes are visible.

St. Croix Island at 33°47′58″S 25°46′11″E is 3.9 km (2.4 mi) from the nearest land and rises to 59 m (194 ft). The BirdLife fact sheet states the 12 ha (30 acres) island is only 58 m (190 ft) above sea level. It adds that the island is rocky and “supports minimal vegetation”. The island runs 700 m (2,300 ft) along a northwest, southeast axis and is about 360 m (1,180 ft) wide at its broadest – along the west coast. Its highest point is halfway along the north coast. Bartholomeu Dias planted a padrão and celebrated Mass on the island in March 1488. With 22,000 African penguins breeding on the island it is the largest breeding colony of this penguin species. Boat trips out of Port Elizabeth take tourists to see these birds. The population's modern history peaked in 1993, when 63,000 penguins lived there. The population is in decline, following the national and species' trend despite the best efforts of conservation group SANCCOB.

In 2019, the penguins of St. Croix island were impacted by an oil spill at the Port of Ngqura.

As of 2022 there has been no environmental impact assessment of the ship to shore bunkering with further spills leading to the collapse of the breeding colonies.

== Brenton Island ==
Brenton Island (33°49′3″S 25°45′54″E) is equally sparsely vegetated and is less than 20 m (66 ft) in elevation, and is roughly 250 m × 200 m (820 ft × 660 ft) in size with a northwest-southeast orientation. It is 5.75 km (3.57 mi) to sea from the nearest point on the mainland and 1.75 km (1.09 mi) south of St. Croix. It is named after Naval Commissioner Sir Jahleel Brenton.

== Jahleel Island ==
Jahleel, at less than 10 m (33 ft) in height, is just over 1 km (0.62 mi) from the closest beach and less than that from the Port of Ngqura’s 2.6 km (1.6 mi) long eastern breakwater. Jahleel is about the same size as Brenton and has a north-south axis. It is 5.75 km (3.57 mi) west of St. Croix, and is named after Sir Jahleel Brenton.
