= SANCCOB =

Seabird conservation organisation in South Africa

Southern African Foundation for the Conservation of Coastal Birds

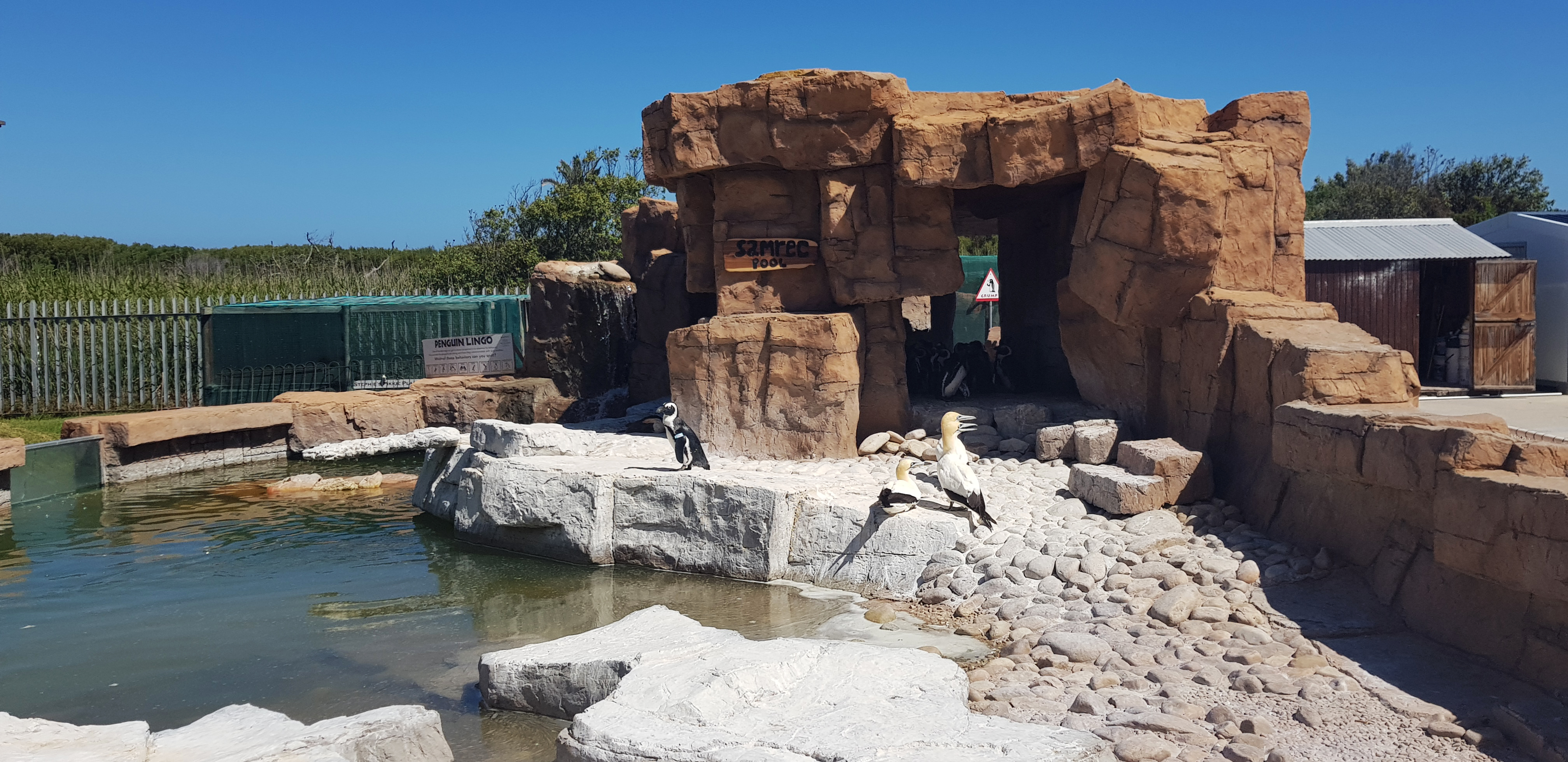
- Abbreviation: SANCCOB
- Formation: November 1968; 57 years ago
- Type: Non-profit organisation
- Headquarters: Rietvlei Wetland Reserve, 22 Pentz Drive, Table View, Cape Town
- Location: South Africa
- Coordinates: 33.83376°S 18.49128°E
- Region served: Southern Africa
- Chairperson: Samantha Petersen
- Chief Executive Officer: Natalie Maskell
- Revenue: R 16 313 854 (2021/22)
- Expenses: R 17 904 631 (2021/22)
- Staff: 21 volunteers; 47 interns
- Website: sanccob.co.za

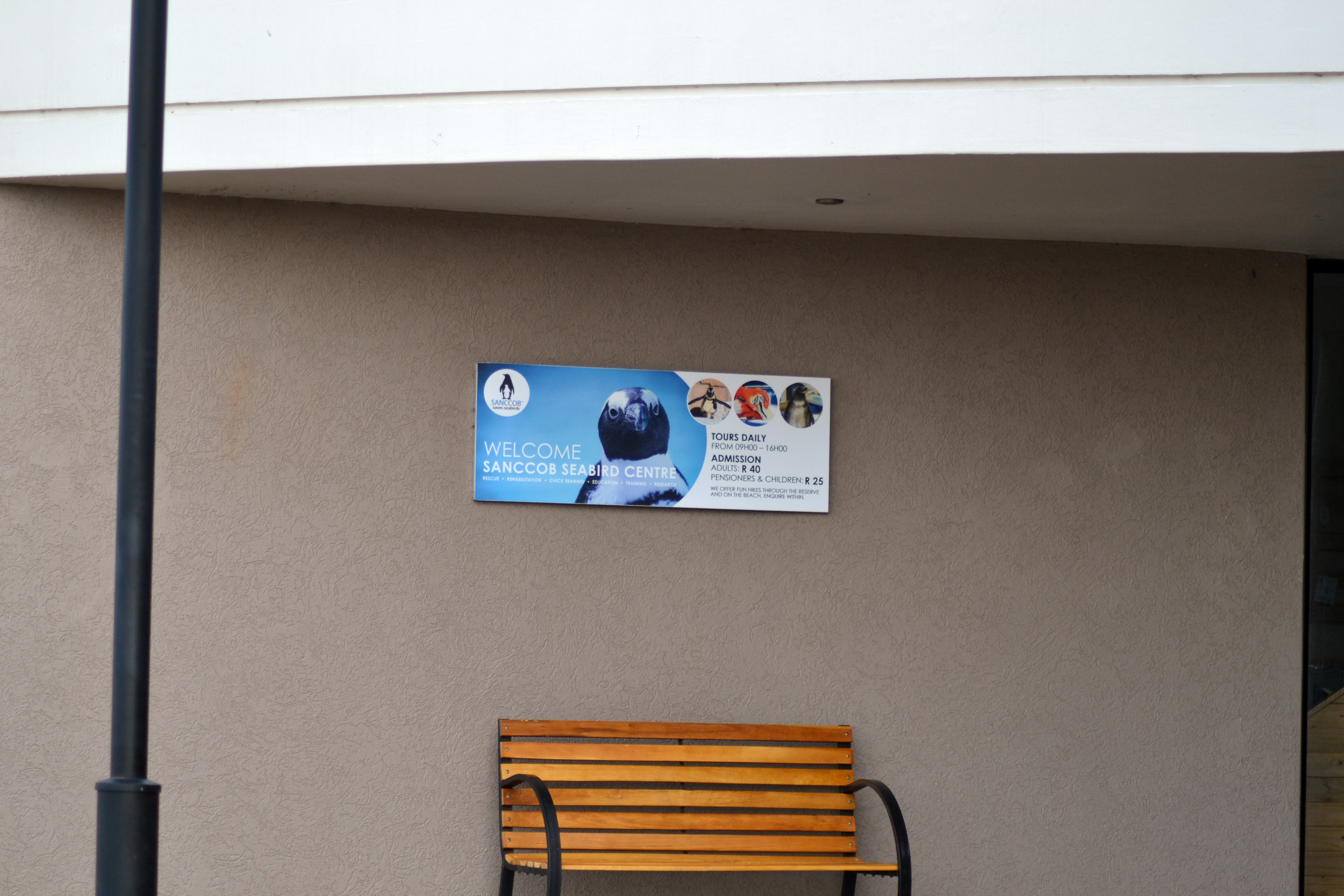
SANCCOB at Cape Recife

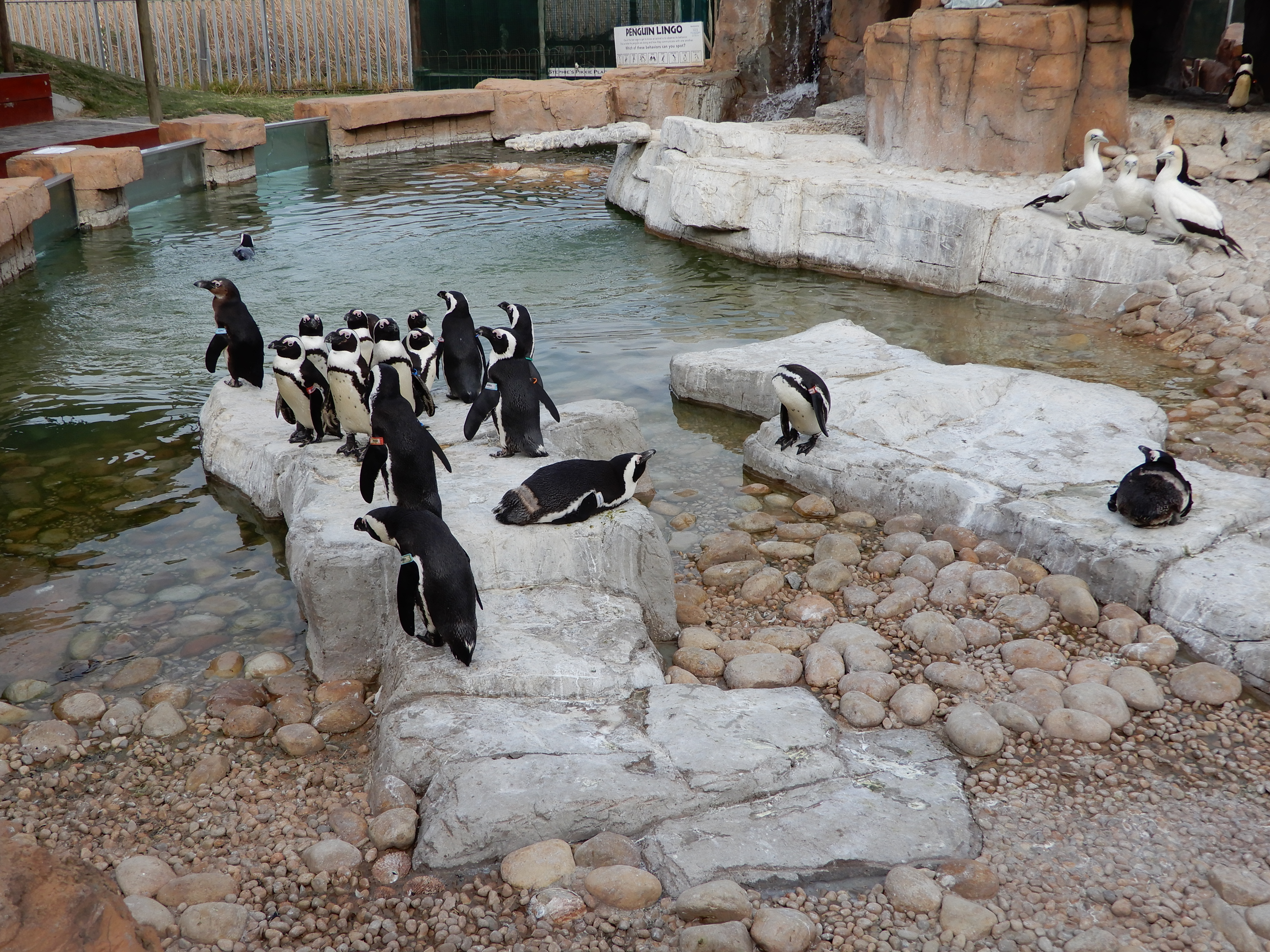
SANCCOB at Cape Recife

The Southern African Foundation for the Conservation of Coastal Birds (SANCCOB) is an international non-profit organisation committed to the rescue, rehabilitation, and release of seabirds in Southern Africa. Recognised by the South African Veterinary Council, SANCCOB operates from its headquarters at the Rietvlei Wetland Reserve in Table View, South Africa.

Established in 1968, SANCCOB aims to safeguard Southern Africa's marine birds, with particular attention to endangered species.

== History ==
The origins of the organisation can be traced the aftermath of the Esso Essen spill in April 1968, an event that underscored the significant impacts of oil pollution. In response to the oiled African penguins, Althea Louise Burman Westphal established a temporary rehabilitation facility in her residence and formally established SANCCOB in November, 1968.

SANCCOB was motivated by increasing incidents of penguins being injured by oil pollution along South Africa's coasts. This rise in pollution was attributed to heightened tanker traffic following the closure of the Suez Canal after the Six-Day War. SANCCOB emerged as a proactive response to address this environmental challenge.

Under the leadership of Roy Siegfried, SANCCOB gained formal recognition. Their efforts were supported by evidence documenting the decline in the penguin population over several decades. From 1969 to 1993, SANCCOB provided sanctuary to an average of 200 to 2,000 birds, primarily African penguins.

SANCCOB has responded to major oil spills, including the Apollo Sea spill in 1994 and the Treasure spill in 2000. During the latter incident, SANCCOB evacuated 19,500 un-oiled birds as a precautionary measure, representing a significant portion of the global population at that time.

In addition to crisis response, SANCCOB also mitigates the impact of oiling incidents. Between 1990 and 2005, an average of 750 oiled penguins were taken in annually. Since its inception, SANCCOB has cared for more than 85,000 seabirds.

== Conservation ==
=== African penguin ===
SANCCOB implements a comprehensive set of conservation strategies to address the complex array of challenges facing the African penguin, a species classified as endangered. These focus on rescue and rehabilitation, which serves as a key component in mitigating the adverse impacts of human activities and environmental factors on African penguin populations. The organisation's rescue and rehabilitation activities address injuries, illnesses, and instances of abandonment. Upon receiving distress calls from concerned individuals and field rangers, SANCCOB dispatches teams to transport affected penguins to its facilities located in Cape Town and Port Elizabeth, where professionals and volunteers deliver specialised care, encompassing medical treatment, nutritional support, and tailored behavioural rehabilitation for each individual bird. SANCCOB's rehabilitation process prioritises the preparation of penguins for successful reintroduction into their natural environment. This entails ensuring that rehabilitated individuals retain crucial survival skills, such as hunting and social behaviours, while minimising human imprinting to facilitate their seamless reintegration into wild populations. In addition to direct intervention, SANCCOB actively engages in research and collaborative efforts aimed at addressing the underlying threats to African penguins. By collaborating with governmental agencies, research institutions, and conservation organisations, SANCCOB contributes to studies focusing on issues such as habitat loss, overfishing, pollution, and climate change, with the aim of identifying and implementing effective mitigation strategies. SANCCOB also works to raise awareness and foster community involvement in African penguin conservation through educational programmes, outreach events, and media campaigns.

Recent initiatives include the establishment of a new penguin colony within the De Hoop Nature Reserve, featuring the use of lifelike penguin decoys and recorded penguin calls to attract penguins to this location.

=== Cape cormorant ===
The Cape cormorant is endemic to the Benguela Upwelling System and faces endangerment due to a notable decline in breeding pairs observed over the past three decades. Various factors contribute to this decline, including the scarcity of primary prey, disease outbreaks, and recent incidents of avian influenza. With a focus on disease response efforts, SANCCOB works to manage outbreaks and mitigate their impact on the species. One significant event occurred in January 2021 when approximately 2,000 Cape Cormorant chicks were discovered abandoned and distressed, exhibiting signs of dehydration and heat stress, at two critical nesting sites. SANCCOB initiated a comprehensive rescue and rehabilitation effort, the first of its kind for the species, during which approximately 54% of the rescued cormorant chicks were successfully rehabilitated and reintroduced into their breeding colonies. There was a direct correlation between the initial body mass of the chicks upon admission to the rehabilitation centre and their likelihood of survival during the rehabilitation process. A high proportion (80.7%) of the cormorant chicks succumbed within the initial five days of admission.

=== Cape gannet ===
The decline of Cape gannets in both Namibia and South Africa is closely linked to the scarcity of their primary prey, sardines. The collapse of sardine stocks in Namibia during the 1960s and 1970s had profound consequences for several seabird species, including Cape gannets and African penguins. Similarly, shifts in sardine distribution and depletion of stocks along the West Coast of South Africa have negatively impacted breeding populations in colonies such as Lambert’s Bay and Malgas Island. Additionally, Cape gannets face threats from oil spills, exemplified by incidents such as the 1983 Saldanha Bay tanker fire, which led to the oiling of 5,000 Cape gannets on Malgas Island. SANCCOB has been instrumental in rehabilitating oiled Cape gannets following spills in both the Eastern Cape and Algoa Bay. Their Gqeberha branch received 100 oiled Cape gannets in March 2024, necessitating immediate washing and care to mitigate the detrimental effects of the oil on the birds' feathers. Prompt treatment is crucial for oiled birds, as the oil compromises their waterproofing, rendering them susceptible to hypothermia and drowning. The rehabilitation process, involving stabilising the birds before washing and subsequent care, typically spans at least four weeks.

=== Bank cormorant ===
The Bank cormorant’s primary breeding grounds are concentrated in Namibia, with approximately 80% of the global population residing in a single colony in that region. Depletion of its primary food source, the Rock lobster, has forced the Bank cormorant to adapt its dietary habits, leading to increased competition for alternative prey and struggles to find sufficient sustenance. Through initiatives focused on research, rehabilitation, and community engagement, SANCCOB works to mitigate the threats facing this species and ensure the long-term viability of its populations. In January 2021, SANCCOB, in collaboration with the International Fund for Animal Welfare (IFAW), embarked on a large-scale rescue mission to save thousands of Cape cormorant chicks abandoned on Robben Island, providing essential care, including tube feeding and rehydration therapy, to the rescued chicks, followed by preparation for release back into the wild.

== Partnerships ==
SANCCOB conducts educational programmes, outreach activities, and awareness campaigns to underscore the importance of seabirds, the challenges they face, and how individuals can contribute to their protection. Although not formally accredited, SANCCOB collaborates with entities like the Saving Animals From Extinction (SAFE) programme and a global network of zoos, aquariums, and conservation organisations.

SANCCOB collaborates with numerous AZA-accredited organisations in various conservation efforts. Many of these institutions participate in an international partnership aimed at safeguarding endangered African penguins, while others engage through the SAFE programme. Additionally, AZA institutions offer financial support for African penguin conservation projects in South Africa and Namibia.

== Facilities and operations ==
SANCCOB's facilities include two seabird hospitals (in Cape Town and Gqeberha) that include surgical theatres, intensive care units, and other specialized areas; a three-part wash bay area for oiled seabirds; an aviary; and rehabilitation pens and pools.

== Certification ==
SANCCOB does not hold formal accreditation. However, it has obtained international certification from the Global Humane Conservation programme. SANCCOB has also undergone an independent assessment evaluating the well-being of animals under their care, demonstrating excellence in animal care and welfare practices.
