= Apollo Sea =

Bulk carrier that sank in 1994

History
- Name: E. W. Beatty
- Owner: CP Ships
- Builder: Nippon Kokan K. K., Tsurumi & Shimizu, Japan
- Yard number: 893
- Completed: 1973
- Commissioned: 1973?
- Decommissioned: 1987
- Identification: IMO number: 7327677
- Name: Solita
- Owner: unknown
- Recommissioned: 1987
- Decommissioned: 1991
- Name: Apostolos Andreas
- Owner: unknown
- Recommissioned: 1991
- Decommissioned: 1993
- Name: Apollo Sea
- Owner: China Ocean Shipping Company
- Recommissioned: 1993
- Decommissioned: 1994
- Fate: foundered in gale/storm and sank on 26 June 1994 at 33°32.49′S 17°50.92′E in 147–180 m (482–591 ft)

General characteristics
- Type: Cargo-bulk carrier
- Tonnage: 69,904 GT
- Length: 260 m (853 ft 0 in)
- Beam: 41.7 m (136 ft 10 in)
- Propulsion: single diesel engine with single shaft and screw
- Speed: 15 knots (28 km/h; 17 mph)
- Crew: 36

MV Apollo Sea was a Chinese-owned, Panamanian-registered bulk carrier which sank near Cape Town in June 1994. Leaking oil from the sunken vessel caused a major environmental disaster which resulted in the death of thousands of seabirds, including endangered African penguins. All of the ship's 36 crew members died in the sinking, which apparently occurred so quickly that no general distress signals were given. The first public indication that the ship had sunk was the appearance of penguins covered with oil. The source of the slick was initially believed to be the wreck of the supertanker Castillo de Bellver, but this theory was disproven and the slick was instead traced to the wreck of the Apollo Sea. The vessel had been loaded with 2,400 tonnes (2,700 cubic metres) of heavy fuel oil when she left port four hours before she sank. Later it was revealed that an automated distress signal had been sent directly to the owners via satellite from the approximate location of the oil spill, and the owners eventually admitted the loss of the vessel and accepted responsibility for the spill.

== Environmental impact ==
Gale-force winds hampered attempts to protect Cape Town from the emerging oil slick, and city beaches were streaked with oil. The oil affected the breeding grounds of the endangered African penguin on Dassen Island. Attempts were made to evacuate penguins to the mainland, but efforts were impeded by the rough weather. 10,000 penguins were collected and cleaned. Of those, approximately 5,000 survived.

Six years later, the region's seabird rookeries were threatened by a similar incident; the MV Treasure oil spill.

== See also ==
- List of oil spills
