= Cape Recife =

Point in South Africa

Coordinates: 34°01′44.87″S 25°41′57.91″E

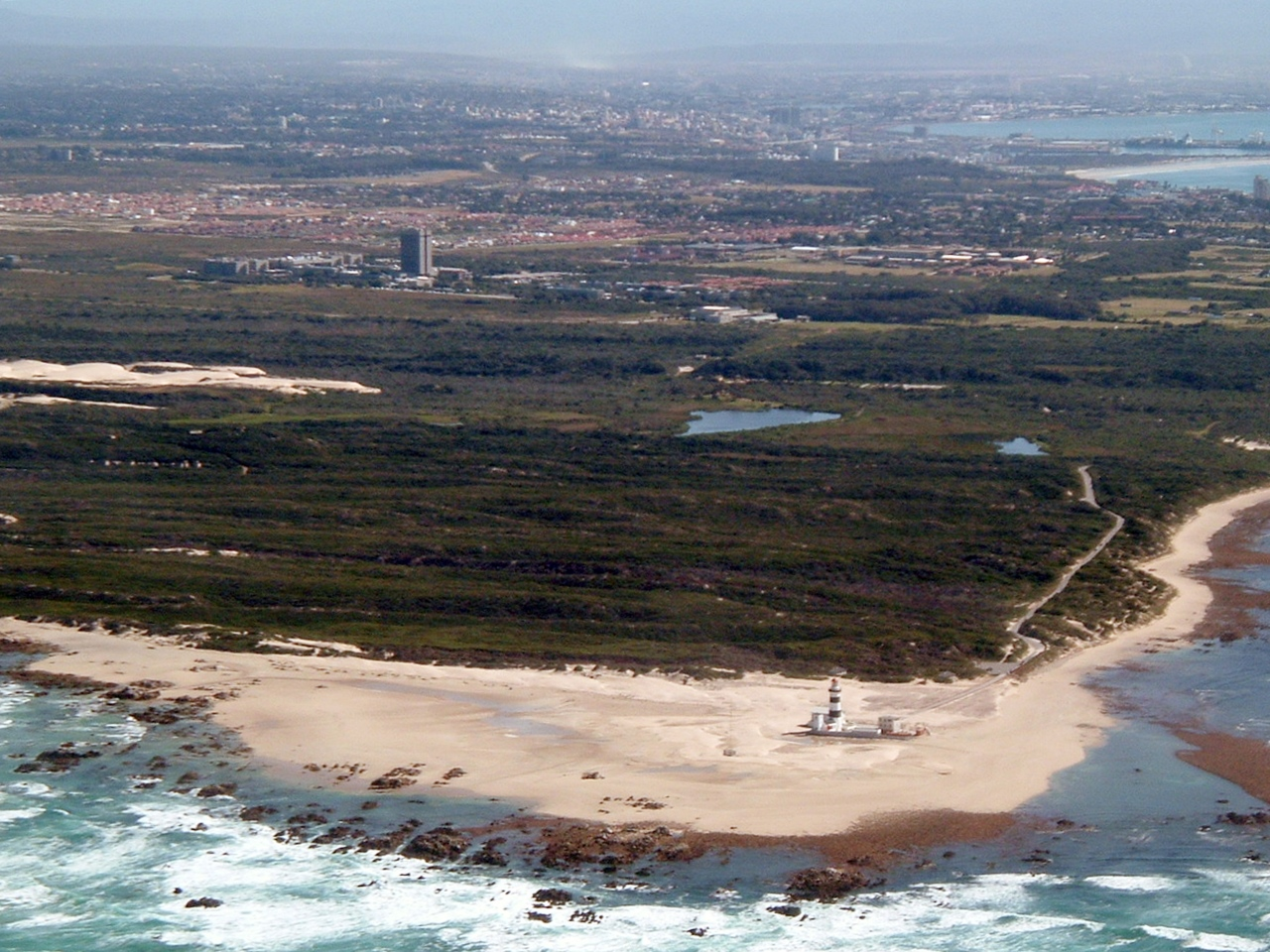
Aerial view of Cape Recife with the lighthouse and Port Elizabeth on the background

Cape Recife (Afrikaans: Kaap Recife; Portuguese: Cabo de Recife, "Cape of the reefs") is the southeastern tip of Africa, 15 kilometres south of the South African seaport city Port Elizabeth. Cape Recife is the southern point of Algoa Bay and forms part of the Nelson Mandela Bay Metropolitan Municipality.

The name, Portuguese for “reef”, refers to the numerous reefs on which many ships stranded. The historic lighthouse was built in 1849 and is located in the Cape Recife nature reserve. Just north are the Nelson Mandela University, Port Elizabeth International Airport and SANCCOB.

Cape Recife is popular with surfers and divers. The warm Agulhas Current flows past the cape.

In 1973 the 366 ha (900 acres) Cape Recife Nature Reserve was proclaimed.

== Gallery ==
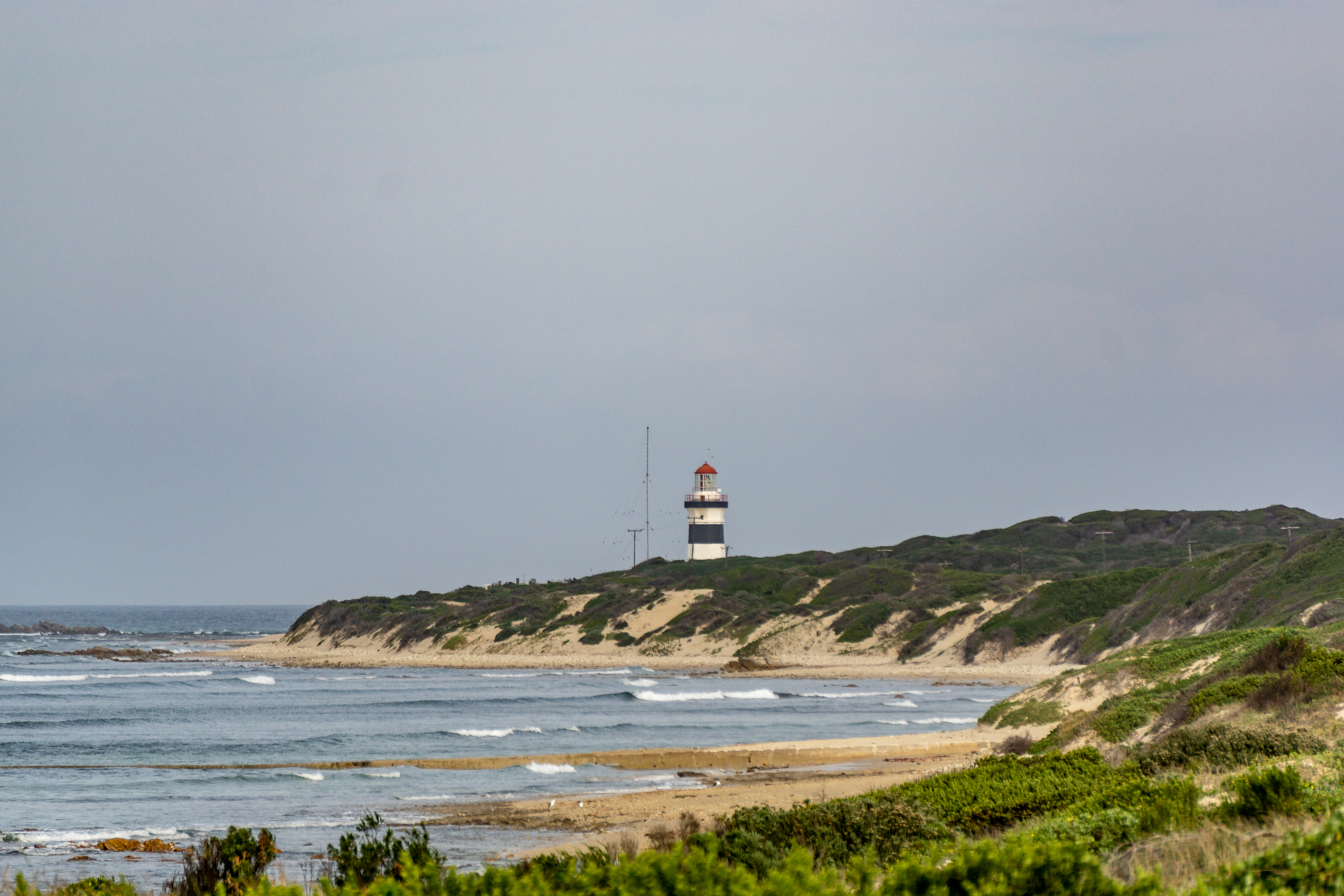
Panorama around Cape Recife

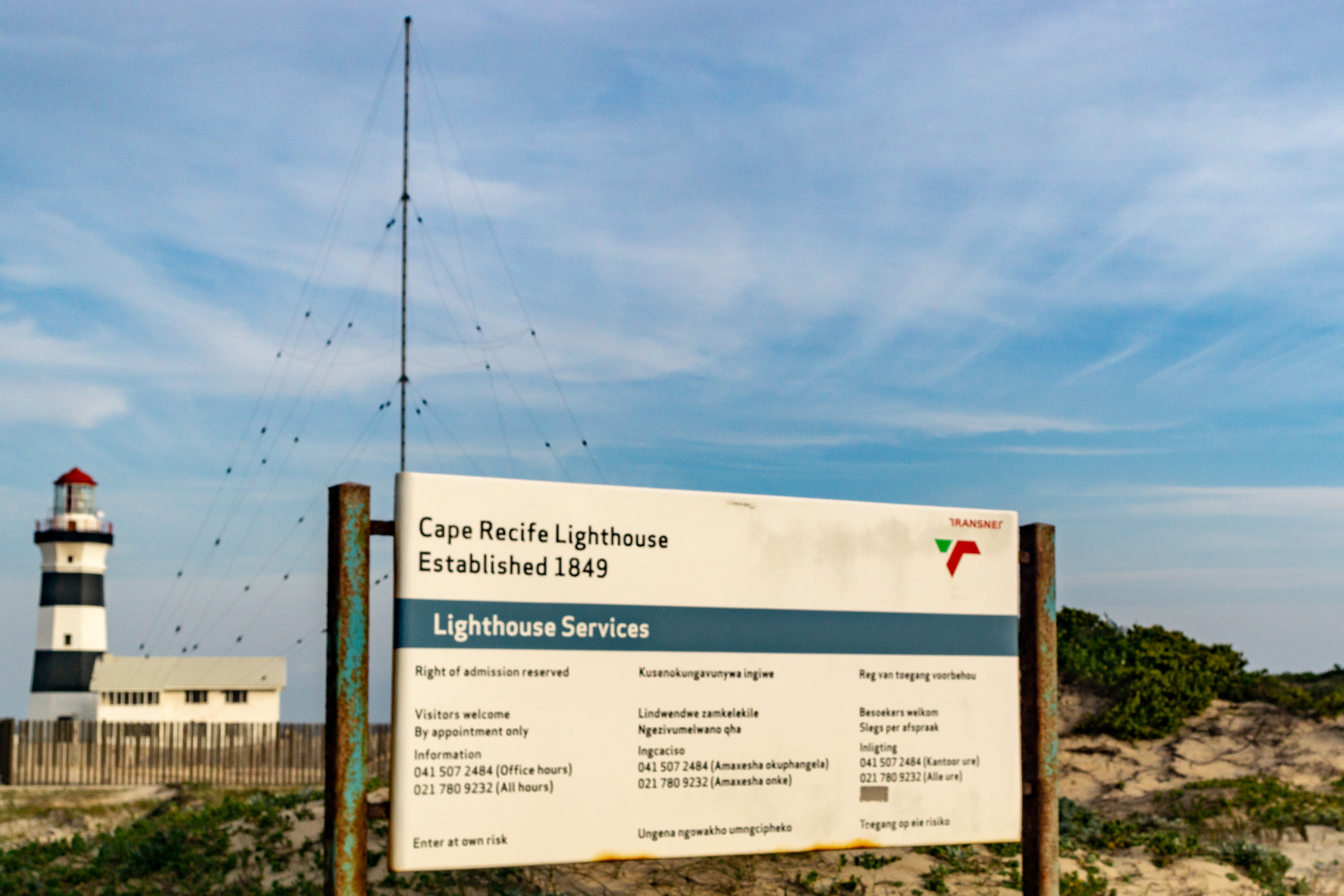
The lighthouse at Cape Recife

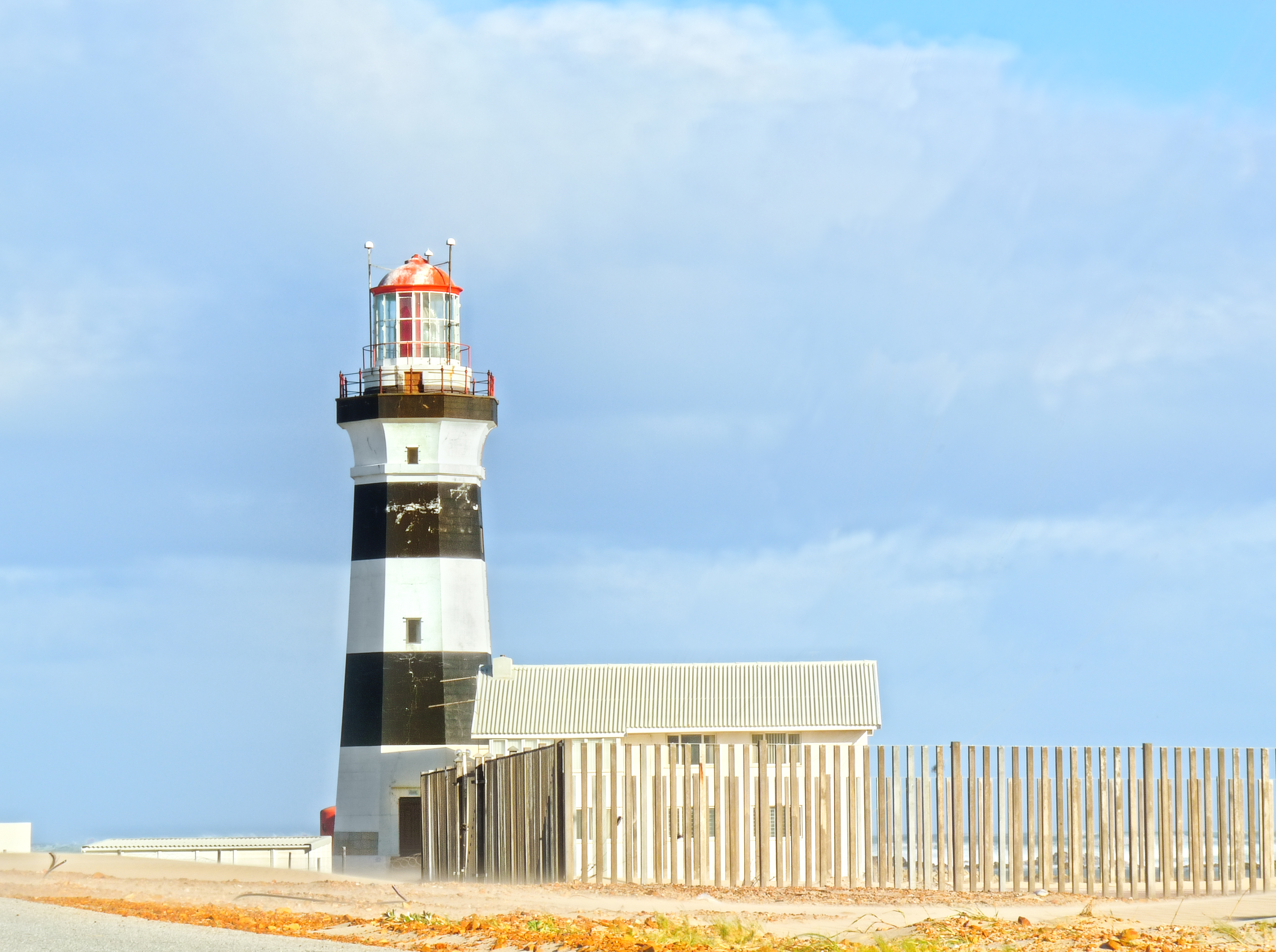
The lighthouse at Cape Recife

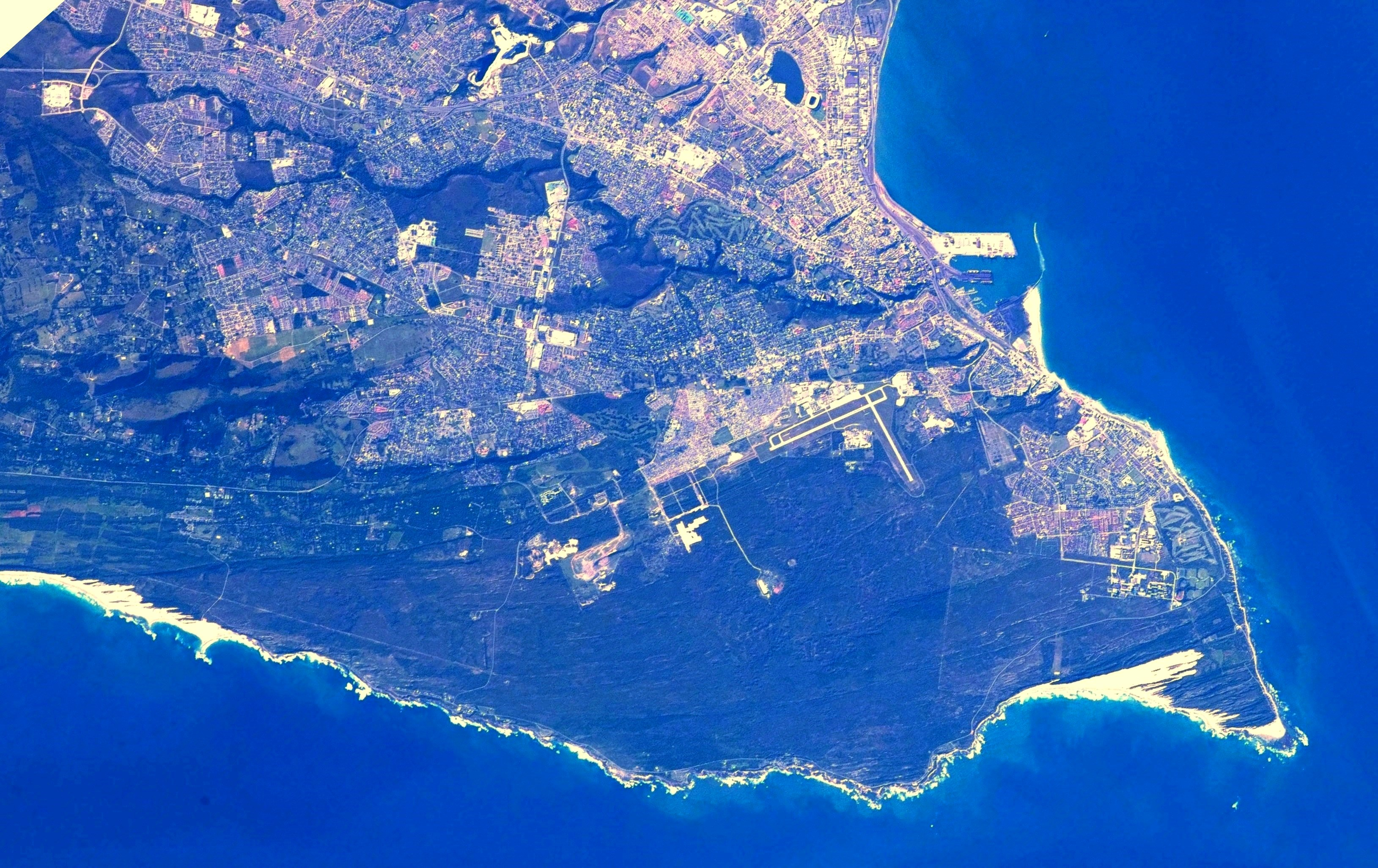
Seen from the IRS
