= Sliedrecht oil spill =

1953 Cape Town oil spill

The Sliedrecht oil spill occurred off the coast of Table Bay, near Cape Town in South African waters in late 1953. The Dutch oil tanker Sliedrecht was "holed" and lost a "huge amount" of oil. It sailed 60 miles offshore to pump out 1,000 tonnes of oil that had been fouled with sea water. Casualties of the oil spill included birds, penguins, fish and other marine life which washed ashore at Table Bay, where the slick also stained the beaches.
