= MV Treasure oil spill =

June 2000 environmental disaster off the coast of South Africa

- Interactive map of MV Treasure oil spill
- Coordinates: 33°40′18″S 18°19′54″E
- Date: 23 June 2000

Cause
- Cause: shipwreck caused by storm damage
- Casualties: 0 (over 2,000 penguins died from oil)

Spill characteristics
- Volume: 400–1,000 tonnes (3,000–7,000 barrels)

The MV Treasure oil spill occurred on 23 June 2000, when the ship sank six miles off the coast of South Africa while transporting iron ore from China to Brazil. The ship was carrying an estimated 1,300 tons of fuel oil, some of which spilled into the ocean, threatening the African penguin populations living on nearby islands. Cleanup efforts began promptly after the incident with particular attention being paid to salvaging the penguin communities.

== Background ==
History
- Name: Berge Captain (1983–1984); Tokomaru (1984–1990); Ocean Conqueror (1990–1997); Treasure (1998–2000)
- Owner: Med Bulkcarriers Inc. (Sig. Bergesen dy & Co), Liberia (1983–1984); Shinei Kaiun K.K. (Tokumaru Kaiun K.K.), Japan (1984–1990); Conqueror Navigation Co Ltd., Cyprus (1990–1997); Universal Pearls SA (Good Faith Shipping Co SA), Panama (1998–2000)
- Builder: Mitsubishi Dockyard & Engineering Works, Nagasaki
- Yard number: 1878
- Launched: 1982
- Completed: 1983
- Identification: IMO number: 8011251
- Fate: Sank on 23 June 2000

General characteristics
- Type: Bulk ore carrier
- Tonnage: 66,413 GT, 143,731 DWT
- Length: 264.3 m (867 ft 2 in)
- Beam: 43.5 m (142 ft 9 in)
- Draft: 17.4 m (57 ft 1 in)
- Propulsion: 1 diesel engine (Sulzer 6-cylinder), single shaft, 1 screw
- Speed: 15 knots (28 km/h; 17 mph)

MV Treasure was a Panamanian-registered cargo ship. The 17-year-old vessel was transporting 140,000 tonnes (140,000 long tons; 150,000 short tons) of iron ore from China to Brazil at the time of the incident. The Weekend Argus newspaper quoted unnamed sources as saying the ship was owned by Universal Pearls, which it claimed to be the same Chinese shipping company that owned Apollo Sea (which sank off Cape Town's coast in 1994 and caused extensive environmental damage).

== Cause ==
Treasure sank on 23 June 2000 from structural damage sustained in foul weather. The vessel went down 6 mi (9.7 km) off the coast of South Africa, between Robben Island and Dassen Island after developing a hole in her hull. Authorities wanted to tow the ship into the South African harbor for repair, but she was too large for the maneuver and was ordered farther off-shore in an attempt to reduce environmental damage from oil pollution. While under tow in rough seas the tow ropes ripped loose. The ship then drifted eastward and sank. The ship's crew were airlifted to safety.

== Amount and type of oil spilled ==
Treasure was estimated to have been carrying 1,300 tons of bunker oil of which 400 tons, approximately 2,680 barrels (113,000 US gal; 426,000 L), spilled into the sea off the coast. The pear-shaped slick, about 3 by 4 nautical miles (5.6 by 7.4 km; 3.5 by 4.6 mi) in area, was spotted around noon by Kuswag VII, the Department of Environmental Affairs' oil pollution patrol aircraft. The oil spilled was the ship's own fuel oil, which was of the heaviest and most viscous commercial fuel that can be obtained from petroleum. Bunker oil, also known as heavy fuel oil, is what remains after the lighter fractions (gasoline, kerosene, diesel, etc.) are removed by distillation. The heaviest materials in crude petroleum are not distilled, as their boiling points are too high to be conveniently recovered. As a result, bunker oil is usually very dark in color, more dense, and a significantly more serious contaminant than less-dense oils.

== Environmental effects ==
Aside from causing the temporary closing of South Africa's ports and threats to species of gannets, cormorants, and seals, Treasure's bunker oil spill was dubbed South Africa's worst environmental disaster, as it seriously threatened its population of African penguins. The spill mainly affected African penguin colonies inhabiting South Africa's Robben and Dassen Islands, which support the largest and third largest colonies of African penguins in the world. At the time of the spill, the worldwide population of African penguins was estimated at less than 180,000. About 150,000 African penguins lived off South Africa's coast, 19,000 of which lived on Robben Island. The Robben Island nature reserve, home to about 14,000 endangered adult African penguins and 6,000 chicks, was hit badly during their breeding season by the oil spill. Over 20,000 penguins were oiled and approximately 2,000 died. There are currently fewer African penguins in the wild than were rehabilitated in the aftermath of the oil spill.

== Cleanup efforts ==
South African Maritime Safety Authority (SAMSA) spokesman Pim Zandee reported that divers confirmed the ship had suffered structural damage when sinking and that oil globules were rising from cracks in the hull. It was also reported that engine room vents, which leaked a steady stream of oil, were closed off, drastically reducing the amount of oil polluting the surface. The dive team continued to seal oil leakages from the wreck. Three days after the sinking, the dive team reported that very little oil was leaking out of the ship.

Different types of methods were used in the cleanup of the oil spill, two of which included workers loading kelp covered in oil into trucks and vacuuming up pools of oil with specially designed vacuums. In addition, booms were used to keep the oil from entering Cape Town Harbor.

South African company Bio-Matrix was contracted to help clean up the oil slick that was polluting the penguins' habitats. The company used a Canadian product, also called Bio-Matrix, made of sphagnum moss properties, which are notable for their natural ability to soak up oil. Bio-matrix works by encapsulating oil without absorbing water. Bio-Matrix is also effective in helping break down and digest oil.

The African penguin rescue effort was one of the largest bird rescue missions undertaken thanks to its many volunteers and teams of professionals. The rescue effort consisted of washing and rehabilitating already-oiled birds and capturing non-oiled birds as a preemptive measure. Within ten days of the Treasure spill, 20,251 oiled African penguins were admitted into the rehabilitation center in Cape Town, and 90% of the oiled birds were rehabilitated and released. Another 19,500 non-oiled penguins were relocated successfully.

The rehabilitation effort was greatly funded by the International Fund for Animal Welfare, which worked together with the local rehabilitation center, the Southern African Foundation for the Conservation of Coastal Birds (SANCOCB), and the International Bird Rescue Center (IBRC), whose oiled wildlife team took action the same day the cargo ship sank. The 12-week rehabilitation process, which cared for over 20,000 birds, required over 130 international team members supervising over 45,000 volunteers, 400 tons of fish to feed the penguins, 7,000 tons of beach sand used in bird pens, and 302 25-litre (5.5 imp gal; 6.6 US gal) containers of detergent to wash the oil off the penguins' feathers. Follow-up studies included the tracking of penguins.

== Dive site ==
Treasure is a recreational dive site. The ship's large size and the facts that its hull is resting on a flat sand bottom at 51 metres (167 ft) down, and part of its main deck is within 30 metres (98 ft) of the surface, coupled with its location in the Bloubergstrand area near Cape Town, South Africa, have contributed to its popularity.

== See also ==
- Shipwrecks of Cape Town
