= Castillo de Bellver oil spill =

1983 oil spill off the coast of South Africa

- Interactive map of Castillo de Bellver oil spill
- Location: Saldanha Bay, Cape Town, South Africa
- Coordinates: 33°16.55′S 17°30.28′E
- Date: 6 August 1983

Cause
- Cause: fire

Spill characteristics
- Volume: 145,000-170,000 tonnes (176,000-210,000 cubic metres) (Note: In this article, conversions from oil weight to oil volume were calculated with a specific gravity of 0.82. Castillo de Bellver was carrying Murban (SG of 0.82) and Upper Zakum (SG of 0.86) light crudes.)

The MT Castillo de Bellver oil spill began on 6 August 1983, when the Spanish tanker caught on fire off Saldanha Bay, approximately 70 miles northwest of Cape Town, South Africa. It was carrying 250,000 tonnes (300,000 cubic metres) of light crude oil, and was traveling through an environmentally sensitive area known for its seabird rookeries and important commercial fishing grounds. The burning vessel was abandoned and broke apart after drifting offshore. Three crew were lost. The stern capsized and sunk and the bow was sunk using explosives. A total of 145,000-170,000 tonnes (176,000-210,000 cubic metres) of oil entered the sea. Onshore impacts were considered negligible as the slick traveled seaward. The only visible impact was the oiling of 1,500 gannets that were on a nearby island.

== Ship ==
History
- Name: Castillo de Bellver
- Owner: Empresa Nacional Elcano De La Marina Mercante Madrid
- Port of registry: IMO number: 7386477
- Builder: Astilleros Españoles S. A.
- Completed: 1978
- Fate: Caught fire, split in two, and sank on 6 August 1983

General characteristics
- Type: Motor tanker
- Tonnage: 138,822 GT
- Length: 334.1 m (1,096 ft)
- Beam: 55.2 m (181 ft)
- Height: 20.4 m (67 ft)
- Draft: 3 m (9.8 ft)
- Speed: 15.5 knots (28.7 km/h; 17.8 mph)

The Castillo de Bellver was built in 1978 to carry light crude oil.

== Incident ==
On 6 August 1983, the Spanish oil tanker Castillo de Bellver was en route from the Persian Gulf to Spain transporting 250,000 tonnes (300,000 cubic metres) of light crude oil.

Around 80 km (50 mi) off Table Bay, South Africa, it exploded and proceeded to burn. The crew abandoned the ship, which proceeded to drift off the coast, eventually breaking in two at around 10 a.m. Approximately 50,000–60,000 t (110,000,000–130,000,000 lb) of light crude was initially spilled into the sea, creating a flaming oil slick. By mid-morning, the ship trailed an oil slick 20 mi (32 km) long and 3 mi (4.8 km) wide.

A fishing trawler, Harvest Carina, rescued 32 crew members from a lifeboat. A passing container ship rescued another crew member. Three additional persons were declared missing.

The stern section of the ship capsized and sank on 7 August in deep waters, 36 km (22 mi) off the coast. There were 100,000–110,000 t (220,000,000–240,000,000 lb) of oil remaining in Castillo de Bellver's tanks. The bow had drifted towards an area that included the Langebaan Lagoon marine life sanctuary, a 15-mile (24 km)-long strip of coast south of Saldanha Port. The bow section was then towed away from the coast and was eventually sunk using explosives.

A total of 78.5 million US gallons (1.87 million barrels) of oil was released into the sea during the incident.

== Response ==
The pollution threat to Cape Province beaches was initially considered "enormous", according to a Cape Town port official. He said that the current could move the oil slick away from the coast but that a 25 knots (46 km/h; 29 mph) northwesterly wind could blow the oil towards the coast.

The oil initially drifted towards the coast. The wind then changed direction and took it offshore, where the slick entered the north-west flowing Benguela Current.

Weather conditions proved to be conducive to spill response and helped prevent a major onshore environmental disaster.

Approximately 230 cubic metres (61,000 US gal) of diluted chemical dispersant and 4 cubic metres (1,100 US gal) of dispersant concentrate were sprayed at the edge of the slick, preventing it from coming within 32 km (20 mi) of the shore.

On August 10, the 150-square-kilometre (58 sq mi) slick was almost 30 nautical miles (56 km; 35 mi) offshore as the bow of the tanker was being towed out to sea.

By August 12, over 200 oiled birds had been recovered "with feathers glued with oil" and taken to conservation centers in Cape Town. Many more were expected to be received.

== Environmental impact ==
The accident area is both ecologically and economically sensitive, rich in flora and fauna. It is also home to a large seabird population. Half of South African lobster and fish landings are caught within this zone, which is also an important nursery area for many fish species. The known environmental consequences of the spill were considered small. About 1,500 gannets that were gathered on a nearby island in preparation for breeding season were oiled. Some seals surfaced during dispersant spraying but are not believed to have been harmed.

"Black rain" of oil droplets fell immediately to the east of the spill during the first 24 hours on wheat-growing and sheep-grazing fields, but no long-term damage was recorded.

The impact on local fish stocks was considered minimal. According to tests conducted on sediment and water samples and plankton trawls, no abnormal presence of hydrocarbons was detected.
