= List of oil spills impacting penguins =

Penguins are vulnerable to exposure to oil spills due to their site fidelity, aquatic lifestyle and near-surface foraging habits. Across their range, penguins have been impacted by chronic and acute oil pollution at sea. The following list includes examples of events where impacts to penguins were documented. It is not exhaustive.

Year	Country	Location	Origin	Species	Notes	References
1925	Australia	Port Phillip Bay, Victoria	Unknown	Little	"A number" of oiled penguins ashore and some dead.	
1934	New Zealand	Kapiti Island, Manawatu beaches	Unknown	Little	“Many” penguins killed and oiled.	
1936	South Africa	Cape Town	Unknown	African	One bird oiled.	
1940	New Zealand	Auckland	Unknown	Little	Hundreds of penguins oiled and killed.	
1945	Australia	Sydney, New South Wales	Unknown	Little	Single penguin captured and treated.	
1946	Australia	Port Phillip Bay, Victoria	Unknown	Little	“Many” penguins killed and oiled.	
1948	South Africa	Dyer Island	Esso Wheeling oil spill	African	One third of penguin population, “thousands” oiled and killed.	
1952	South Africa	Robben Island, Table Bay	Unknown	African	Over 1200 oiled penguins came ashore.	
1953	South Africa	Table Bay	Sliedrecht oil spill	African	Penguins oiled and killed.	
1954	Australia	Port Phillip Bay, Victoria	Unknown	Little	36 penguins oiled.	
1954	Australia	Port Phillip Bay, Victoria	Unknown	Little	“large numbers” of dead and oiled birds ashore	
1968	South Africa	Cape Point, Western Cape	Esso Essen oil spill	African	Over 1700 penguins impacted by oil.	
1971	Australia	Cowes, Victoria	Unknown	Little	43 oiled, dying penguins found.	
1971	Australia	South-eastern South Australia	Unknown	Little	"Hundreds" oiled coming ashore.	
1971	South Africa	Cape Aghulas & Dyer Island	SS Wafra oil spill	African	Over 1216 penguins oiled.	
1972	South Africa	Dassen Island	Unknown	African	4000 penguins impacted.	
1972	South Africa	Ystervark Point	Oswego Guardian-Texanita collision	African	500 penguins impacted.	
1973	Chile	Guamblin Island	Napier oil spill	Magellanic	Impacts unknown. Penguins in vicinity.	
1974	Chile	Strait of Magellan	VLCC Metula oil spill	Magellanic	40,000 birds oiled. Mostly cormorants and penguins.	
1974	Australia	Port Campbell, Victoria	Unknown	Little	"Numbers" of penguins oiled.	
1974	South Africa	Struisbaii, Western Cape	Oriental Pioneer (tanker)	African	Several thousand penguins oiled.	
1978	Chile	San Vincente Bay	Cabo Tamar oil spill	Humboldt, Magellanic	Impacts unknown, penguins in area.	
1979	South Africa	St. Croix Island, Algoa Bay	Unknown	African	Penguins collected to prevent harm.	
1981	Argentina	Bahia Bustamante	Unknown	Magellanic	Dead penguins found, but ecological impact not studied.	
1982	Argentina	Punta Tombo	Unknown	Magellanic	500 oiled penguins found.	
1985	South Africa	Cape Recife	Kapodistrias oil spill		Over 1180 penguins impacted, 137 killed.	
1987	Australia	Macquarie Island	Nella Dan supply ship wreck	Royal, King, Southern rockhopper, Gentoo	70 tonnes of light fuel oil lost, ecological damage unknown.	
1987	Chile	Punta Davis, Strait of Magellan	Cabo Pilar oil spill		4900 tonnes crude spilled, penguin impacts unknown.	
1988	Australia	Portland, Victoria	?	Little	40% of a small colony oiled and killed (100 birds).	
1989	Argentina	Bismarck Strait, Antarctica	Bahia Paraiso oil spill	Several, including Adelie	20,000-30,000 penguins swam through slick, toll unclear owing to 3 year migration pattern, 300 Adelie penguins known to have been killed.	
1990	Australia	Apollo Bay, Cape Otway	Tanker Arthur Phillip	Little	130 collected alive, only 65 survived. Over 200 dead, estimates up to 700 dead.	
1991	Argentina	Chubut Province	Unknown	Magellanic	An estimated 17,000 penguins killed.	
1991	Chile	Punta Tombo	Unknown	Magellanic	Estimated 16,000-17,000 dead penguins found. More expected to have died at sea.	
1994	South Africa	Dassen Island	Apollo Sea	African	10,000 penguins collected and cleaned, half of which survived.	
1995	Australia	Low Head, Tasmania	Iron Baron	Little	An estimated 25,000 penguins died from spill impacts.	
1995	Australia	Bass Strait	Unknown	Little	13 oiled penguins.	
1995	South Africa	off Danger Point Lighthouse	Unknown	African	1332 penguins.	
1998	South Africa	Cape Town	Harbor pipeline burst	African	563 penguins.	
1998	(Falkland Islands) United Kingdom	Falkland Islands	Oil exploration spills	Magellanic	Killed several hundred penguins.	
1999	Australia	Gore Bay, Sydney, New South Wales	Shell tanker	Little	Several birds oiled, five were captured, cleaned and released.	
2000	Australia	Between Summerland Bay and The Nobbies, Phillip Island, Victoria	Unknown	Little	9 killed, 164 more oiled and treated.	
2000	Chile	Cifuncho, Antofagasta	La Moure County (US Navy vessel)	Humboldt	80-120,000 gallons of diesel lost. Penguin impacts unknown.	
2000	South Africa	Robben Island & Dassen Island	MV Treasure oil spill	African	19000 oiled and an additional 19500 removed. Less than 2000 died. 91% rehabilitation success.	
2001	Chile	Moraleda Channel	Jose Fuchs	Magellanic	150 tonnes crude oil spilled.	
2001	Australia	Victoria		Little	438 penguins treated with a 96% survival rate.	
2004	Chile	Primera Angostura, Magellan Strait	Tanker Berge Nice collision with tugboat		160 tonnes of oil spilled. Unknown number of penguins impacted.	
2005	Chile	Antofagasta	Eider cargo ship grounded	Humboldt	Penguins impacted.	
2006	Argentina	Near Cabo Virgenes, south Patagonia	Unknown	Magellanic	100 oiled penguins found. An estimated 400 were oiled.	
2007	Argentina	Caleta Cordova, Chubut	Oil terminal spill	Magellanic	Over 1500 penguins impacted.	
2009	Australia	Kingston / Robe, South Australia	Unknown	Little	7 penguins oiled and treated.	
2008	Uruguay	Montevideo	Tanker Syros oil spill	Magellanic	At least 72 penguins oiled and killed	
2011	New Zealand	Tauranga	Rena oil spill	Little	20,000 seabirds (including penguins) killed by spill and ecosystem impacts. 383 were successfully cleaned and released.	
2011	(Tristan da Cunha) United Kingdom	Tristan da Cunha islands	MS Oliva	Rockhopper	20,000 penguins oiled, 4,000 relocated to Tristan da Cunha. "Thousands" more died.	
2015-2016	Chile	near Cachagua		Humboldt	Penguin colony threatened by two oil spills during this period.	
2016	South Africa	Port of Ngqura	Bunkering	African	100 oiled penguins were treated.	
2019	South Africa	Port of Ngqura	Bunkering	African	Hundreds of penguins were harmed in minor spill.	
2022	Peru	Lima	Repsol refinery	Humboldt	Penguins and other seabirds oiled. Some rescued and cleaned.	
