= Puerto Pirámides =

- Town
- Interactive map of Puerto Pirámides
- Coordinates: 42°34′S 64°17′W
- Country: Argentina
- Province: Chubut
- Department: Viedma
- Founded: July 14, 1900

Government
  - Intendant: Jorge Perversi (PRO)
- Elevation: 7 m (23 ft)

Population (2010-10-27 census)
  - Total: 565
- Time zone: UTC−3 (ART)
- Post code: 9121
- Area code: 0280
- Climate: BSk

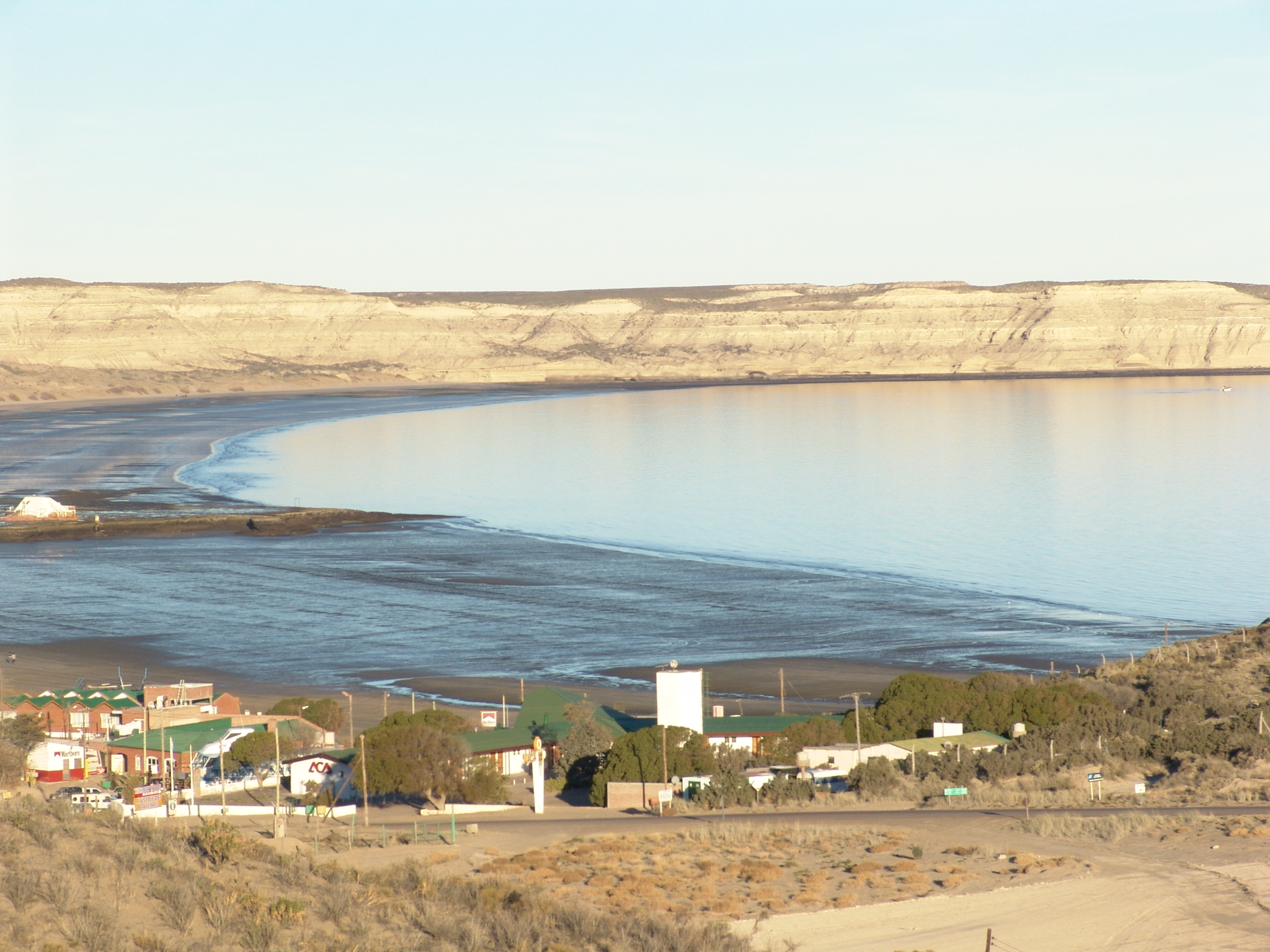
View of Puerto Pirámides and the Golfo Nuevo ("New Gulf").

Puerto Pirámides is an Argentine town in Viedma Department, Province of Chubut. Its population at the 2001 census [INDEC] was 429 inhabitants. It is the only town on the Valdes Peninsula. It began in 1898 when the inland salinas were exploited for salt.

One of six nature reserves along Península Valdés, the Punta Pirámide reserve was established in 1974. The only town in Península Valdés, Puerto Pirámides became one of the premier whale watching destinations in the world; the municipality has six hotels, 15 lodges and two campgrounds.

== History ==
Originally inhabited by the Tehuelche people, attempts around 1800 to take control of the area on the part of Spanish and Criollo colonists resulted in a routing by the headstrong Tehuelches. In 1898, Buenos Aires developer Antonio Muno ventured into the exploitation of the area's considerable salt mines, for which he obtained permission to build a rail line and other facilities in 1900. Opting for the calm waters of the Golfo Nuevo, he christened the new settlement Puerto Pirámides for the numerous pyramid-shaped cliffs that overlook the inlet.

The disruption of international trade during World War I, however, caused the temporary collapse of the salt market and the closure of the local salt mines. Following bankruptcy proceedings, Muno was forced to cede his share of the land to one of his partners, Alejandro Ferro, who kept the area as a semi-private haven until the Province of Chubut expropriated it in 1958.

The inlet was the scene of an as-yet unexplained series of submarine incidents during 1958 to 1960, though afterward, the tiny hamlet drew little interest; tourists preferred nearby Golfo San Jorge, where whale watching was better. During a survey of the area in 1972, famed oceanographer Jacques Cousteau observed that calving southern right whale mothers in a Golfo Nuevo location near Puerto Pirámides had little interest in raising offspring there, despite preferring to give birth at the site. When local entrepreneurs launched the first tourist expeditions later that year, however, calving whales began to stay year-round.

== See also ==
- List of World Heritage Sites in the Americas
