= P. Dee Boersma =

American conservation biologist

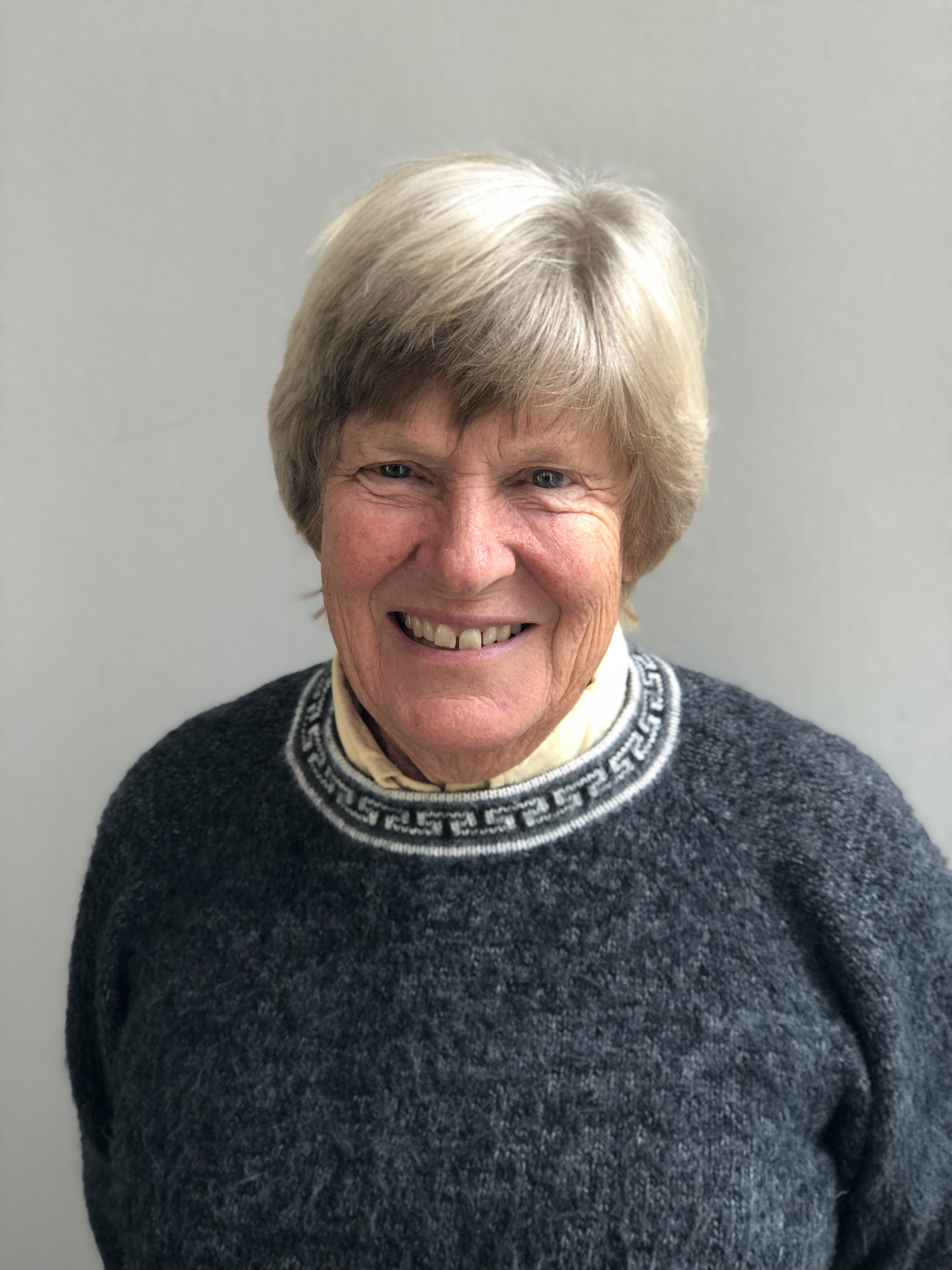
- Born: 1946 (age 79–80)
- Education: Central Michigan University; Ohio State University
- Scientific career
- Fields: Conservation biology
- Workplaces: University of Washington
- Thesis: The Galapagos Penguin: A Study of Adaptations for Life in an Unpredictable Environment.

P. Dee Boersma, also known as Dee Boersma (born 1946) is a conservation biologist and professor at the University of Washington, where she is Wadsworth Endowed Chair in Conservation Science. Boersma's area of work focuses on seabirds, specifically Magellanic penguins. She has directed the Magellanic Penguin Project at Punta Tombo, Argentina since 1982. She is the founder of the Center for Ecosystem Sentinels, hosted at the University of Washington, and dedicated to the study of sentinel species as early warning systems of natural or human caused environmental change.

== Early life and education ==
She grew up in Michigan. She graduated from Central Michigan University in 1969 and later completed her Ph.D. in Zoology from Ohio State University in 1974. Her dissertation was on Galapagos penguins and titled "The Galapagos Penguin: A Study of Adaptations for Life in an Unpredictable Environment."

== Career ==
Boersma began teaching at the University of Washington in 1974. Over multiple decades, her career has focused on protecting penguins from oil spills, habitat loss, and road construction plans that would disrupt nesting sites.

Boersma and a team of researchers banded more than 44,300 Magellanic penguin chicks at Punta Tombo from 1983 to 2010, finding 3,296 of those chicks made it back to the breeding colony where they were born. Overall, they found that fewer female penguins survived. Her research in Argentina has demonstrated climate-induced change that forced penguins to swim about 25 miles farther each day in search of food, which reduced their chance of survival.

In 1983, Boersma began finding penguins dead on the beaches covered in oil, which caused her and her team to bring the evidence to the attention of the government's and ultimately led to tanker lanes being shifted further offshore. This shift protected the penguins from the effects of commercial petroleum dumping in the ocean.

Boersma has received multiple awards for teaching and her contributions to science, including a Distinguished Service Award from the Society for Conservation Biology in 2006 and the 15th Heinz Environmental Award. She is the author of Penguins: Natural History and Conservation and Invasive Species in the Pacific Northwest.
