= Punta Ninfas =

Coordinates: 42.9373°S 64.3346°W

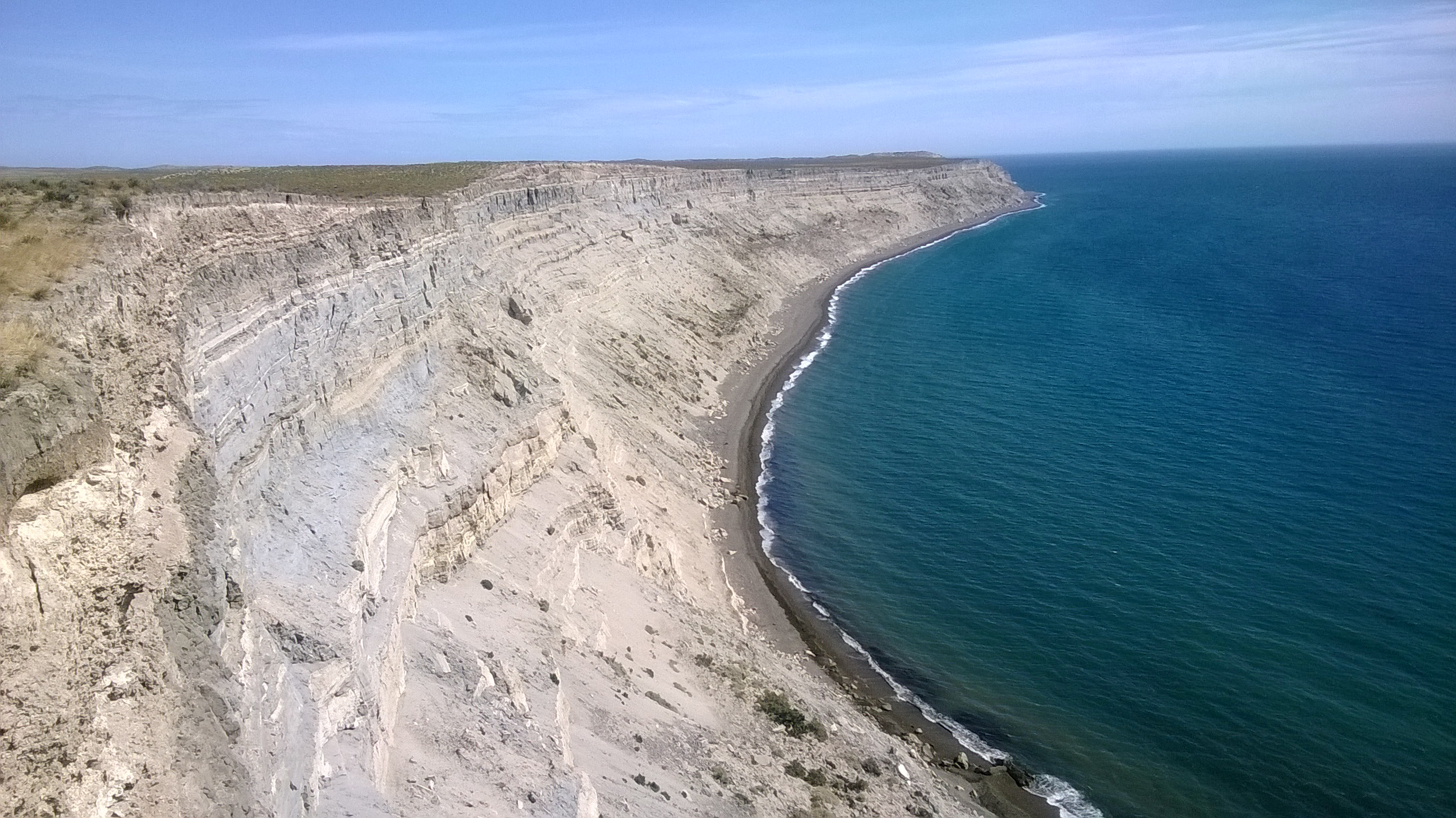
Bird eye view of Punta Ninfas,

Punta Ninfas (Spanish, "Nymphs Point") is found in Chubut Province, Patagonia, Argentina. A promontory into the Atlantic Ocean, it encloses one side of the Golfo Nuevo, with Península Valdés opposite almost enclosing the circular gulf. The Point is about 90 km southwest of Puerto Madryn.

A lighthouse is situated at the Point, which is made up of high, bare cliffs. Punta Ninfas is the location of an important colony of elephant seals, whose breeding season occurs from September to December, with their moulting season taking place from January to April.
