= VLCC Metula oil spill =

Coordinates: 52.500°S 69.650°W

Site of the oil spill: South beach of the Primera Angostura in the Magellan Straits (Estrecho de Magallanes)

The VLCC Metula was in a supertanker that was involved in an oil spill in Tierra del Fuego, Chile in 1974. The ship was a Very Large Crude Carrier (VLCC), with a length of 1,067 feet (325 m), draft of 62 feet (19 m) and a deadweight ton capacity of 206,000. It was the first VLCC supertanker to be involved in a major oil spill.

The Metula was sailing from Ras Tanura in Saudi Arabia with a load of over 196,000 tons of light Arabian crude oil destined for delivery to the Chilean National Oil Company (ENAP) at Quintero, Chile.

On the evening of August 9, 1974, the tanker was passing through the First Narrows area, which is over three and half kilometers wide, of the Strait of Magellan, during severe tidal and current conditions. The Metula cut a corner too sharp, hitting a 40-foot shoal and grounding itself. The difficulty of navigating a ship of such size, with minimum navigation aids, contributed to the accident.

On the second day after the grounding, the Metula swung to starboard, holing and flooding its engine room compartments. The U.S. Coast Guard, at the request of the Chilean government played a role in removing the cargo from the ship.

The tanker released about 47,000 tonnes of Arabian light crude oil and between 3,000 and 4,000 tonnes of heavy fuel oil. The rough sea conditions resulted in the formation of a water-in-oil emulsion, which then landed on the shores of Tierra del Fuego.

The Metula was refloated on September 25, 1974, and was laid up and scrapped at Santander, Spain in June 1976. (source http://www.aukevisser.nl/supertankers/VLCC%20L-M/id94.htm)

No cleanup operation was executed due to the remoteness of the area; on many shorelines, the oil formed hard asphalt pavements. One marsh received thick deposits of mousse, which were still visible two decades after the disaster. By 1998, most of the oil deposits had broken up, though asphalt pavement remained in a relatively sheltered area, making it among the longest-term contamination recorded for an oil spill.

== Effects ==
Following the spill, there were significant negative impacts on the Chilean fishermen. The oil spill resulted in the heavy contamination of the waters of straits of Magellan- forcing Chilean fishermen to other waters. The Straits were often turned to by the fishermen to hunt sea bass when they weren't hunting king crab. As a result of the spill, the fisheries were rendered unusable for an entire year for the Chilean fishermen. In addition, the overall quality of the fish remained poorer for a long time proceeding.

== Ecological impact ==
One of the most significant impacts of the spill was its effect on marine water fowl. A survey conducted between September 14 and 15, 1974 found 408 cormorants, 66 Magellanic penguins, 23 ducks, and 84 seagulls dead because of heavy oiling between Punta Piedra and Punta Anegada. By February 1975 it is estimated that 3000 to 4000 birds may have been killed. Another estimate placed bird mortalities at 40,000. Concern was also raised regarding the fate of tens of thousands of penguins who nest on three islands in the area. Furthermore, additional ecological damage was heavily noted in the littoral zone, where rich populations of mussels as well as populations of limpets and starfish were found to be heavily oil coated. The value of these organisms as food for other species was highly evident by the number of shell middens prevalent behind many of the local habitations. Thus, the spill had a negative impact to several food chains of that region. Moreover, two years after the spill, the geographic area still appeared devastated and there were no signs of any regrowth of vegetation.

== Economic impact ==
The overall economic damage to Chile would be considered minor. However, the main economic stress that was prevalent was the tremendous difficulty to arrange logistical and manpower resources, and the cost of implementing a plan and managing the clean up. The estimated clean up cost of the spill ranged from 25 million to as high as 50 million US dollars.

== See also ==
- Guamblin Island's oil spill
- Cabo Tamar oil spill
