= Puerto Madryn =

City and port in Chubut, Argentina

Puerto Madryn Porth Madryn
- City and Port
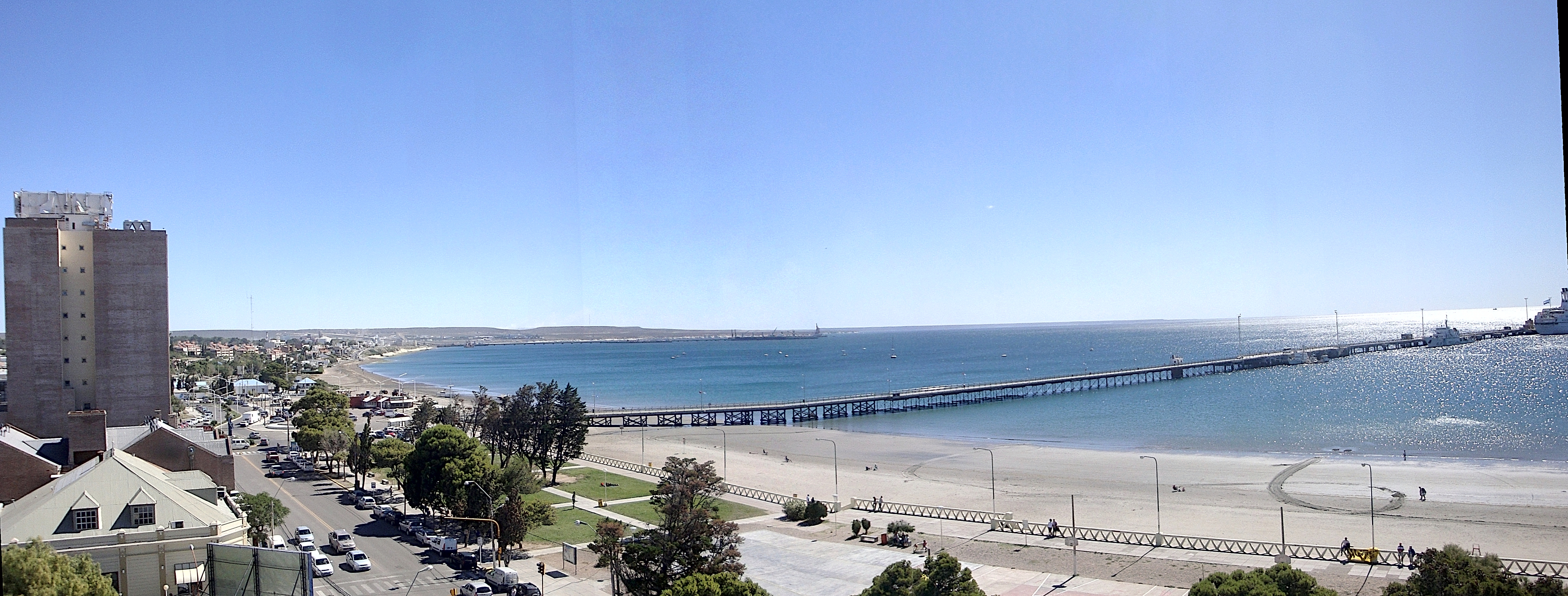

- Flag Coat of arms

- Location of Puerto Madryn in Argentina Puerto Madryn (Argentina)
- Coordinates: 42°46′S 65°3′W
- Country: Argentina
- Province: Chubut
- Department: Viedma
- Founded: 28 July 1865
- Founder: Love Jones Parry

Government
  - Intendant: Ricardo Sastre (Justicialist Party)

Area
  - Total: 330 km^{2} (130 sq mi)
- Elevation: 17 m (56 ft)

Population (2022 census)
  - Total: 103,175
  - Density: 310/km^{2} (810/sq mi)
- Demonym: Madrynense
- Time zone: UTC-3 (ART)
- CPA base: U9120
- Dialing code: +54 2804
- Climate: BWk
- Website: www.madryn.gov.ar

Puerto Madryn (Spanish pronunciation: [ˈpweɾto ˈmaðɾin]; Welsh: Porth Madryn), usually known as Madryn, is a city in the province of Chubut in Argentine Patagonia. It is the capital of the Viedma Department, and has about 103,175 inhabitants according to the last census in 2022.

Puerto Madryn is protected by the Golfo Nuevo, which is formed by the Península Valdés and the Punta Ninfas. It is an important centre for tourists visiting the natural attractions of the Península Valdés and the coast.

The name of the city commemorates Love Jones Parry, one of the colonizers of Patagonia, who owned Madryn Castle in Wales. The toponym originated around 1863, when Love Jones Parry, along with Lewis Jones travelled to Patagonia aboard Candelaría to decide whether that region was adequate for a Welsh colony.

A new shopping mall in the city centre has helped tourism develop significantly, making Puerto Madryn a more attractive place for both international and domestic tourists visiting Patagonia. It is twinned with Nefyn, a small town on the Llŷn Peninsula in North Wales, the result of its enduring link with Welsh culture since the Welsh settlement in Argentina. The first of a two-Test tour to Argentina by the Wales national rugby union team was played in 2006 in Puerto Madryn, a 27–25 win for Argentina. Puerto Madryn is home to two football clubs; Club Social y Atlético Guillermo Brown, who play in Nacional B and Deportivo Madryn that currently play in Torneo Argentino B.

A basketball team, Deportivo Puerto Madryn, plays in the Liga Nacional de Básquetbol (LNB). Their home arena is known as the Deportivo Puerto Madryn Arena.

El Tehuelche Airport is located 10 km (6 miles) northwest of the city centre. Commercial flights from Buenos Aires, Ushuaia, and other Argentinian cities are available. Most tourists fly into Trelew Airport as flights into Puerto Madryn are restricted as a result of environmental concerns.

== Geography ==
Puerto Madryn is situated on the Golfo Nuevo, which is formed by the Valdés Peninsula and Punta Ninfas. The city features a cool arid climate (Köppen BWk), with an annual precipitation of between 150 and 200 millimetres or 6 and 8 inches, very warm summers with pleasant mornings, and cool winters with chilly mornings.

=== Climate ===
Climate data for Puerto Madryn (extremes 1901–1950, 1982–present) (Note: The record highs and lows are based on the Secretaria de Mineria link for the period 1901–1950 while records beyond 1982 come from the Oficina de Riesgo Agropecuario link which covers from 1990–present and data from Centro Nacional Patagónico which covers 1982–2001.)
Month	Jan	Feb	Mar	Apr	May	Jun	Jul	Aug	Sep	Oct	Nov	Dec	Year
Record high °C (°F)	43.4 (110.1)	40.5 (104.9)	37.9 (100.2)	34.9 (94.8)	28.5 (83.3)	25.4 (77.7)	26.5 (79.7)	29.0 (84.2)	30.2 (86.4)	35.0 (95.0)	38.0 (100.4)	39.0 (102.2)	43.4 (110.1)
Mean daily maximum °C (°F)	27.4 (81.3)	26.9 (80.4)	24.4 (75.9)	20.8 (69.4)	16.1 (61.0)	12.9 (55.2)	12.8 (55.0)	14.5 (58.1)	17.0 (62.6)	19.9 (67.8)	23.7 (74.7)	26.2 (79.2)	20.2 (68.4)
Daily mean °C (°F)	19.9 (67.8)	19.4 (66.9)	17.3 (63.1)	14.2 (57.6)	10.4 (50.7)	7.8 (46.0)	7.3 (45.1)	8.5 (47.3)	10.5 (50.9)	13.1 (55.6)	16.0 (60.8)	18.3 (64.9)	13.6 (56.5)
Mean daily minimum °C (°F)	13.7 (56.7)	13.2 (55.8)	11.1 (52.0)	8.1 (46.6)	5.1 (41.2)	3.0 (37.4)	2.1 (35.8)	2.7 (36.9)	4.5 (40.1)	6.9 (44.4)	9.7 (49.5)	12.0 (53.6)	7.7 (45.9)
Record low °C (°F)	3.7 (38.7)	1.7 (35.1)	−2.6 (27.3)	−4.8 (23.4)	−8.6 (16.5)	−11.0 (12.2)	−11.6 (11.1)	−10.0 (14.0)	−8.0 (17.6)	−5.9 (21.4)	−2.0 (28.4)	−0.6 (30.9)	−11.6 (11.1)
Average precipitation mm (inches)	10.0 (0.39)	14.1 (0.56)	16.6 (0.65)	12.6 (0.50)	23.8 (0.94)	14.1 (0.56)	16.6 (0.65)	10.6 (0.42)	14.1 (0.56)	17.8 (0.70)	10.1 (0.40)	12.4 (0.49)	172.8 (6.80)
Average relative humidity (%)	49	53	54	56	63	66	63	59	58	59	51	48	57
Mean monthly sunshine hours	289	251	234	170	137	118	134	149	194	234	255	273	2,438
Percentage possible sunshine	62	65	61	52	45	43	46	47	55	57	58	58	54
Source 1: Secretaria de Mineria, Oficina de Riesgo Agropecuario (extremes 1990–present) Centro Nacional Patagónico (extremes 1982–2001)
Source 2: FAO (sun only)

== History ==
The town was founded on 28 July 1865, when 150 Welsh immigrants arriving aboard the clipper Mimosa named the natural port Porth Madryn in honour of Sir Love Jones-Parry, whose estate in Wales was called Madryn after the Welsh name for Saint Materiana. Conditions were difficult and the settlers had to dig irrigation ditches for their first crops.

The settlement grew as a result of the building of the Central Chubut Railway by Welsh, Spanish, and Italian immigrants. This line, opened in 1889, linked the town to Trelew via the lower Chubut River valley.

Puerto Madryn was the port to which Argentine prisoners of war captured in the Falklands Islands during the 1982 war were repatriated on the vessels SS Canberra, MV St Edmund and MV Norland, which sailed from Port Stanley on 18 June 1982.

== Twin towns ==
- Puerto Montt, Chile
- Paola, Italy
- (Wales) Nefyn, United Kingdom
- Pisco, Peru
- Ciudad del Carmen, Mexico

== Gallery ==
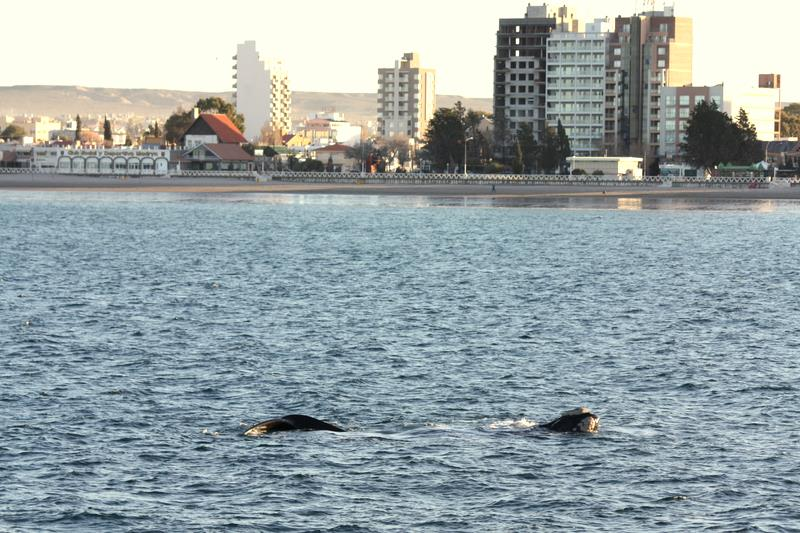
View of Puerto Madryn from the bay with a southern right whale.

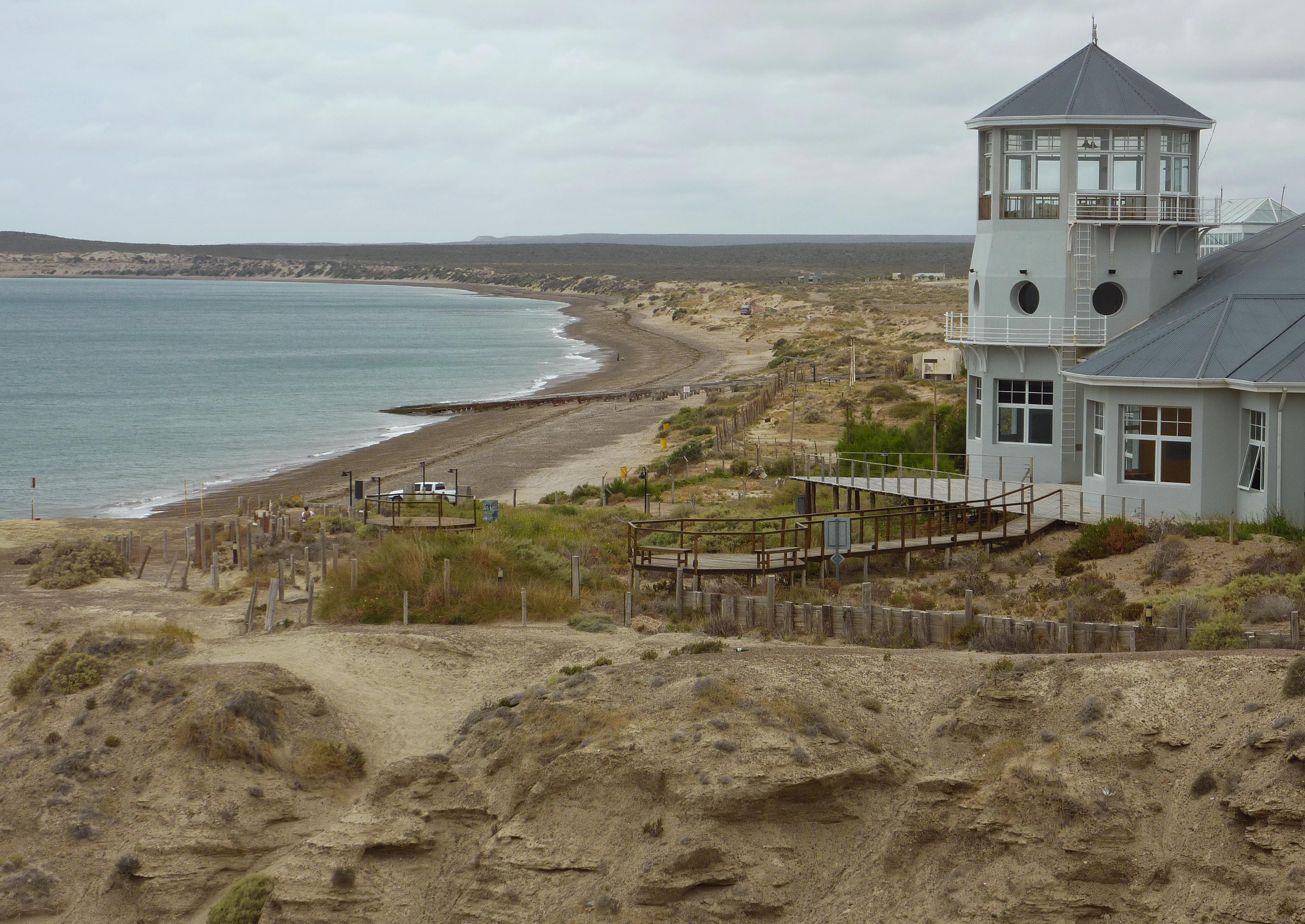
Puerto Madryn coast.

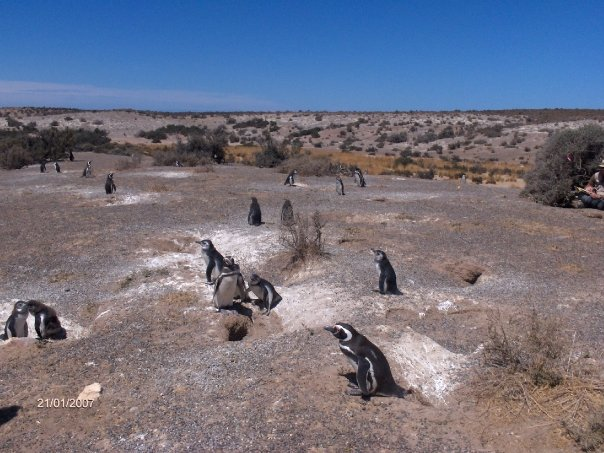
Penguin population near the coast.

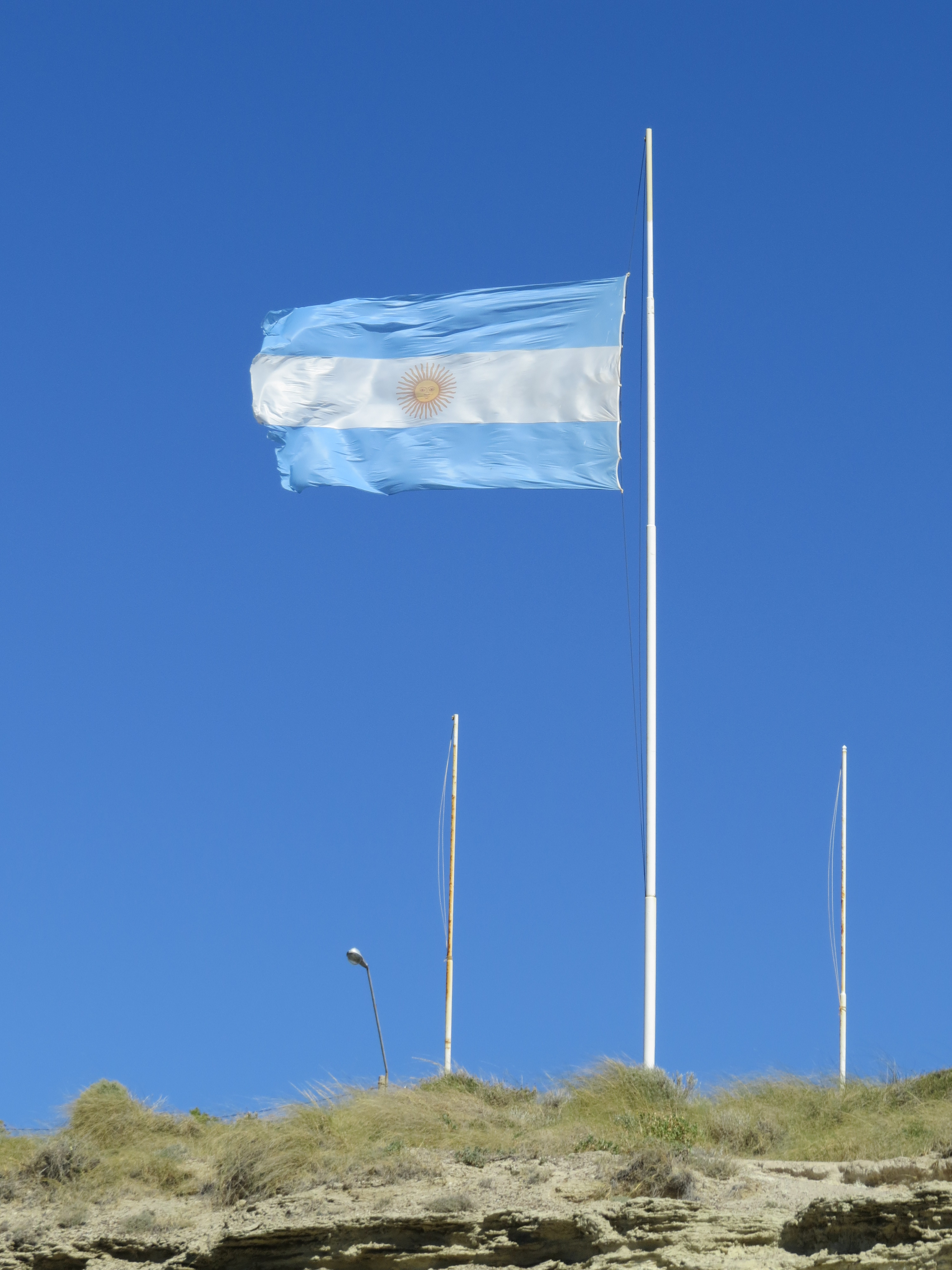
Flag of Argentina in Puerto Madryn.

Flag flown to recognise the original Welsh settlement of the area

== See also ==
- Immigration in Argentina
- Hospital A R Isola
