= Hospital A. R. Isola =

- Hospital Dr. A. R. Isola

Geography
- Location: Puerto Madryn, Chubut Province, Argentina
- Coordinates: 42.754398°S 65.049309°W

History
- Opened: 1934

Links
- Lists: Hospitals in Argentina

Hospital A. R. Isola is the public hospital for the City of Puerto Madryn in the province of Chubut, Argentina.

The hospital was founded in 1934, and transferred to the province of Chubut in 1974.

Hospital A. R. Isola is one of several that have been selected to participate in the "Hospital Schools of Argentina" project, a cooperative venture that aims to use the internet to continue the education of children even while they are hospitalized.

In July 2007, an expansion of the intensive care unit was initiated that will add more than 120 square meters of space, and incorporate an additional five beds for intensive care and another five beds for intermediate care.
