= Punta Tombo =

Peninsula into the Atlantic Ocean

Coordinates: 44°02.4′S 65°12′W

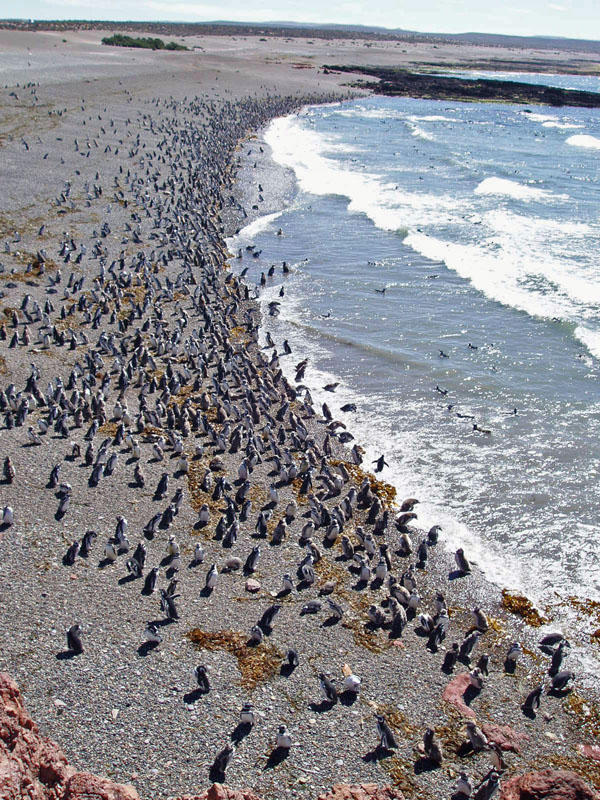
Penguins at Punta Tombo, Chubut.

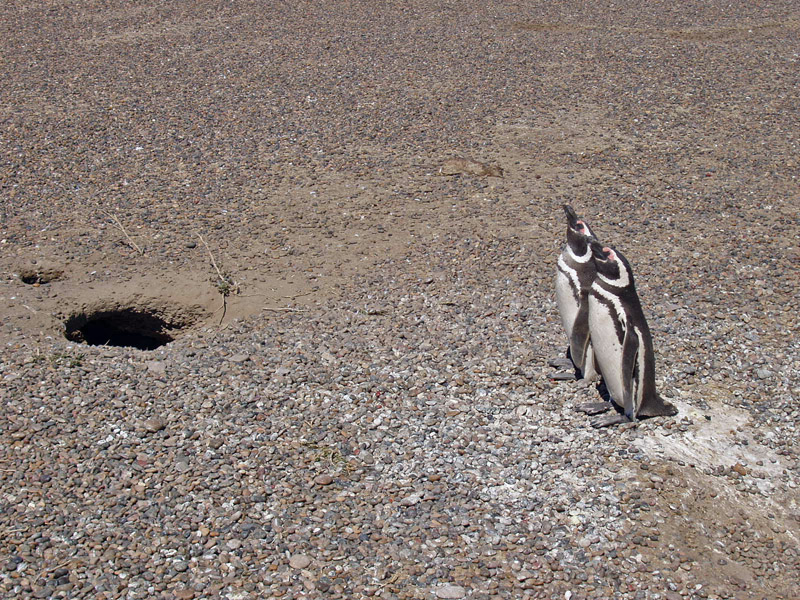
A pair of Magellanic penguins protecting their nesting burrow

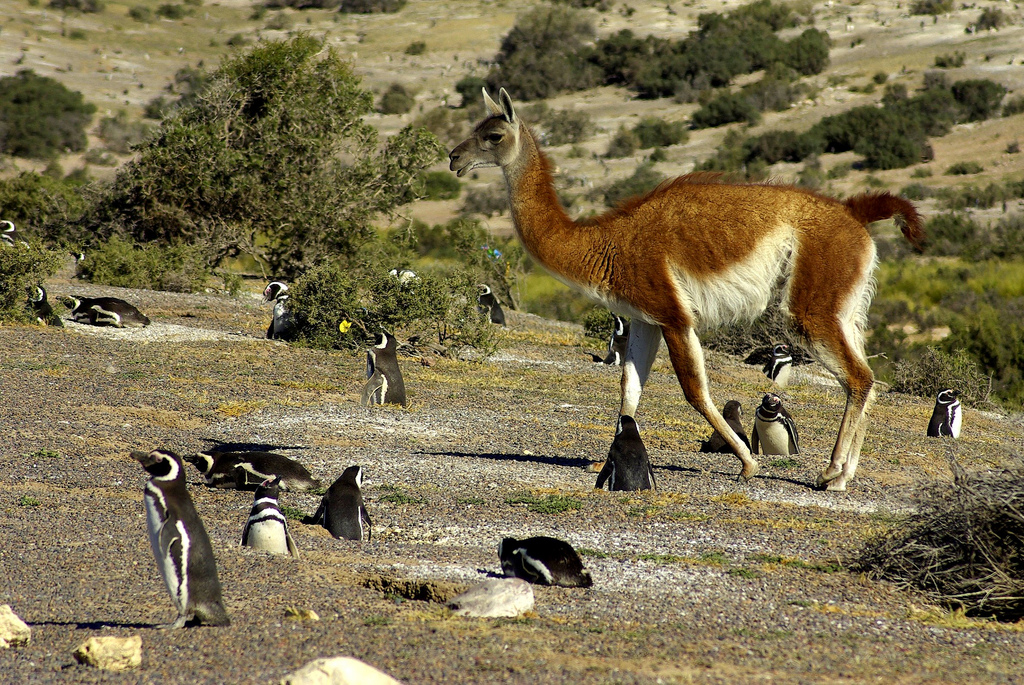
Guanaco with penguins

Punta Tombo is a peninsula into the Atlantic Ocean 110 km (68 mi) south of Trelew in Chubut Province, Argentina, where there is a large colony of Magellanic penguins - the largest such colony in Argentina. It is a short distance north of Camarones.

== Natural reserve ==
The 2.1 km^{2} (0.8 sq mi) Punta Tombo Provincial Reserve has been protected since 1979, according to a provincial decree, and it is one of the main tourist attractions in Chubut. Punta Tombo is part of the new marine national park at Golfo San Jorge.

The 3 km (1.9 mi) long, 600 m (1,969 ft) wide peninsula is covered with sand, clay and gravel.

A variety of wildlife can be seen in the area, including a colony of Magellanic penguins, other seabirds (mainly gulls and cormorants), rheas and guanacos.

In the 19th century, British mariners knew Punta Tombo as "Tombas".

=== Magellanic penguin colony ===
The Magellanic penguin colony at Punta Tombo is exposed to overfishing of prey species and oil spills, many of which go unreported. One such spill in August 1991 claimed the lives of at least 16,000 Magellanic penguins, some of which made landfall at Punta Tombo in an oiled condition. The spill coincided with the population's breeding migration. More penguins were expected to have died at sea. The colony's population exceeded 1,000,000 birds in 1982. Between 1994 and 1995, the colony's population dropped 37%. In 1999, the colony was an estimated 400,000 birds.

In 2017, over a million birds were present at the colony.

== See also ==
- Punta Ninfas
- Península Valdés
