= Biedma Department =

Biedma
- Department
- Departamento Biedma
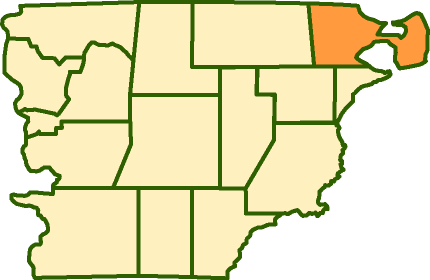
- location of Biedma Department in Chubut Province
- Coordinates: 42°46′S 65°02′W
- Country: Argentina
- Province: Chubut
- Capital founded: July 28, 1865
- Capital: Puerto Madryn

Government
  - Intendant: Gustavo Sastre (PJ)

Area
  - Total: 12,940 km^{2} (5,000 sq mi)

Population (2001 census [INDEC])
  - Total: 58,667
  - Density: 4.534/km^{2} (11.74/sq mi)
  - Change 1991-2001: +28.98%
- Post code: 9120
- Area code: 02965
- Distance to Buenos Aires: 1,334km

Biedma is a department located in the north east of Chubut Province, on the Atlantic coast of Argentina. The spelling Viedma is also sometimes used, but the spelling Biedma is preferred, to distinguish the department from the city of Viedma in Río Negro Province.

The provincial subdivision has a population of about 59,000 inhabitants in an area of 12,940 km^{2}, and its capital city is Puerto Madryn, which is located around 1,334 km from Buenos Aires.

== Economy ==
The main contributors to the economy of Biedma are tourism, fishing, farming and the production of Aluminium.

== Attractions ==
- Valdés Peninsula (World Heritage Site)

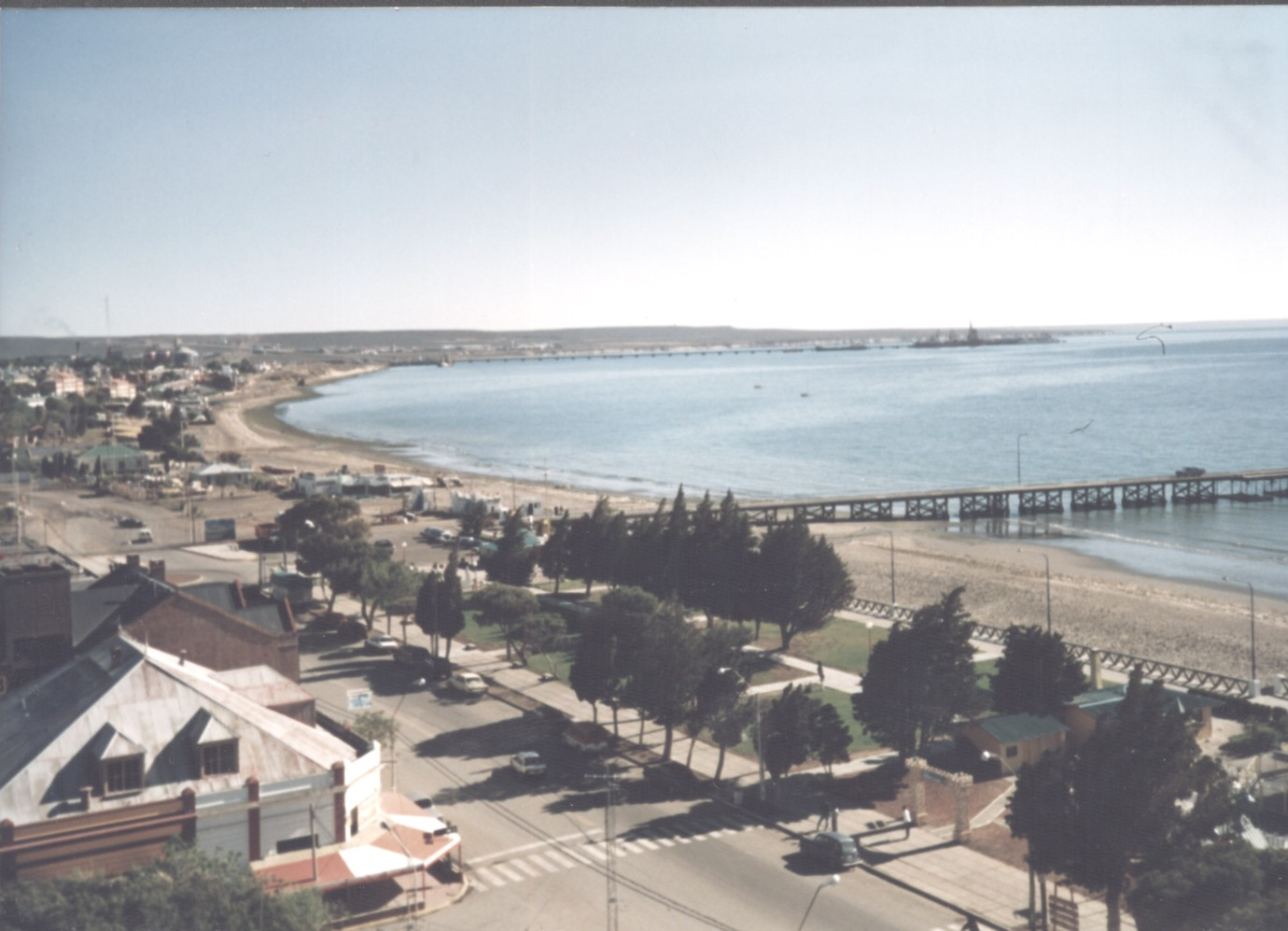
Northern shoreline of Puerto Madryn.

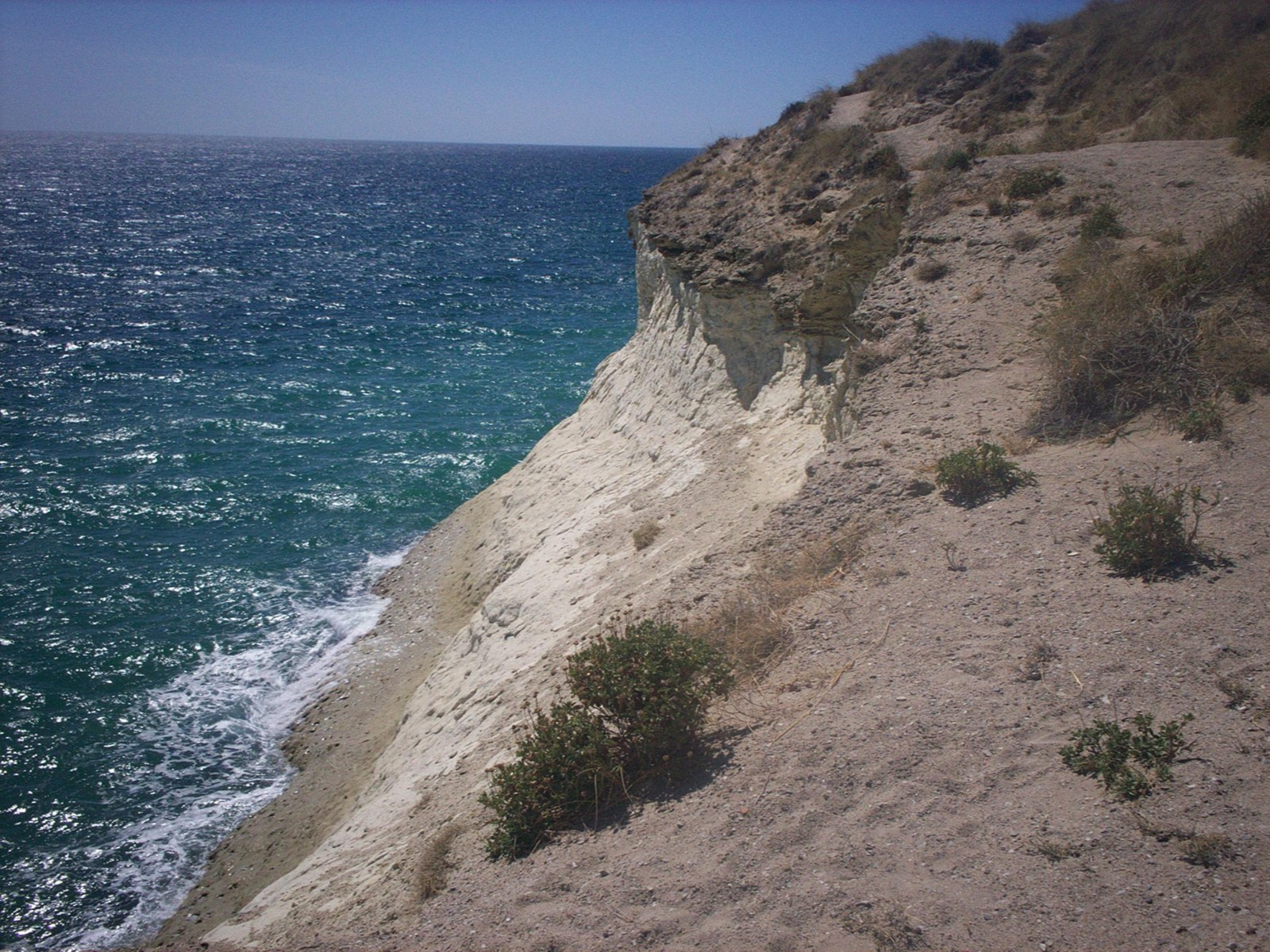
Shore cliffs common along the Patagonian shore.

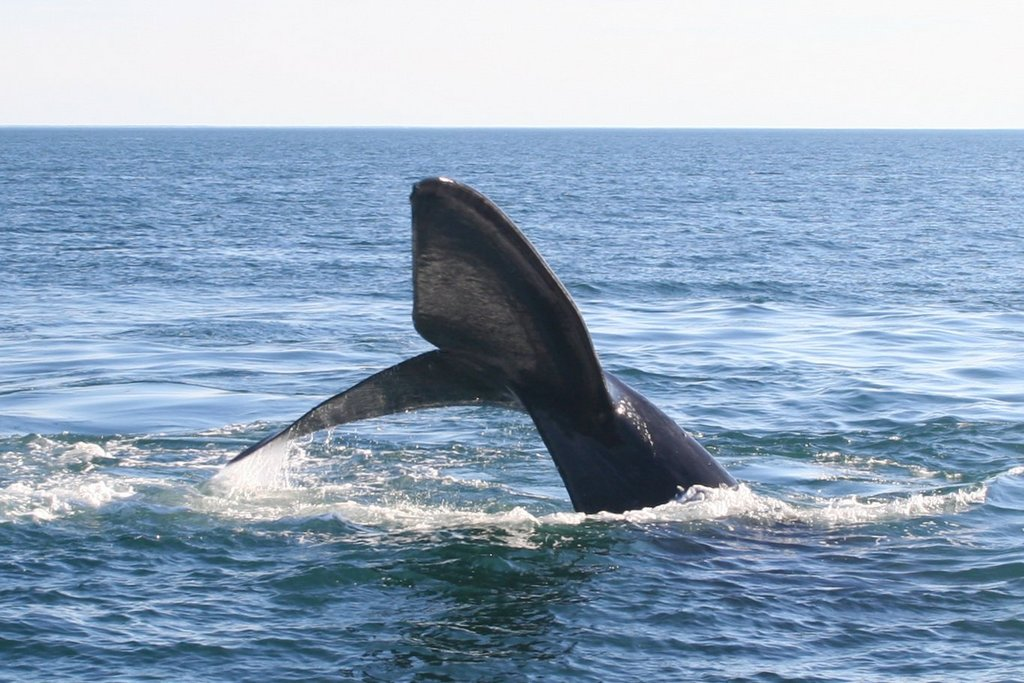
Southern right whale.

== Sport ==
Puerto Madryn is home to two football clubs; Club Social y Atlético Guillermo Brown, who play in Torneo Argentino A and Deportivo Madryn that currently play in Torneo Argentino B.

== Settlements ==
- Puerto Madryn
- Puerto Pirámides
- Mina Guanacache
- Arroyo Verde
- Puerto Lobos
- Riacho San Jose
