= Cabo Tamar oil spill =

1978 oil spill in Chile

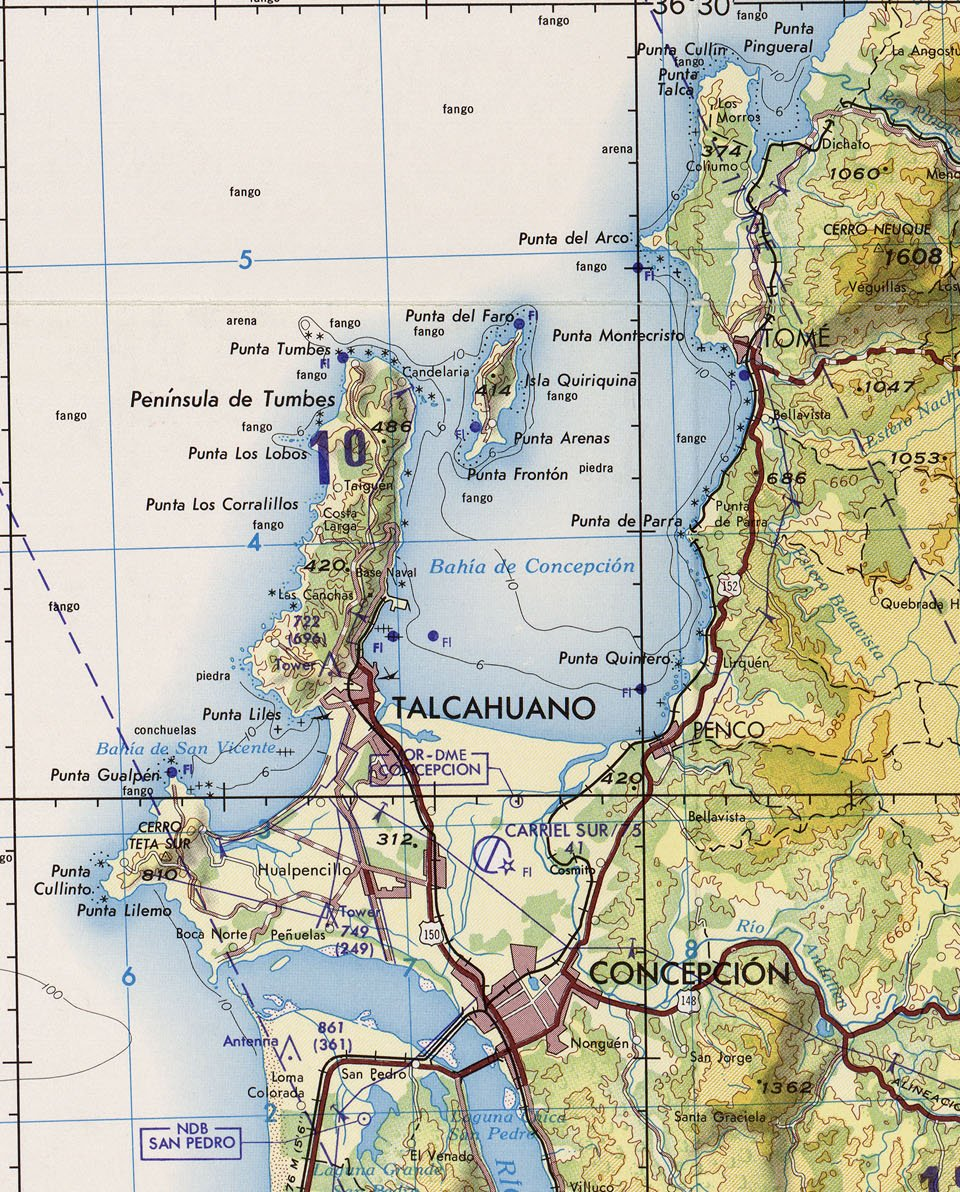

On 7 June 1978, the Chilean Oil tanker Cabo Tamar ran aground at San Vicente Bay, near Talcahuano, Chile, and released 12,000 tons of oil (of the 64,000 ton load).

== See also ==
- VLCC Metula oil spill, biggest oil spill in Chile
- Guamblin Island, second biggest oil spill in Chile
