= Golfo Nuevo =

Coordinates: 42°42′S 65°36′W

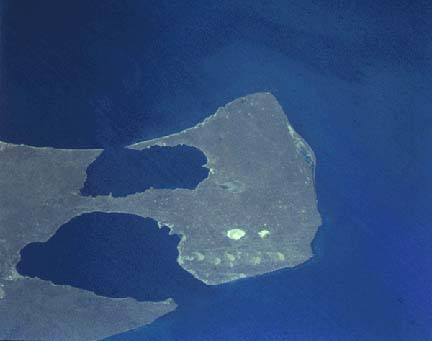
Golfo Nuevo is the enclosed body of water pictured in the lower left-hand corner of this image.

Golfo Nuevo (Spanish for "New Gulf") is a body of water formed by the Península Valdés and Punta Ninfas in the province of Chubut in the Argentine Patagonia. It is located 650 miles (1,050 km) southwest of Buenos Aires, Argentina. Puerto Madryn is its major seaport.

== Wildlife ==
From May to December, the southern right whales migrate to Golfo Nuevo to breed, drawing numerous tourists through Madryn.

== History ==
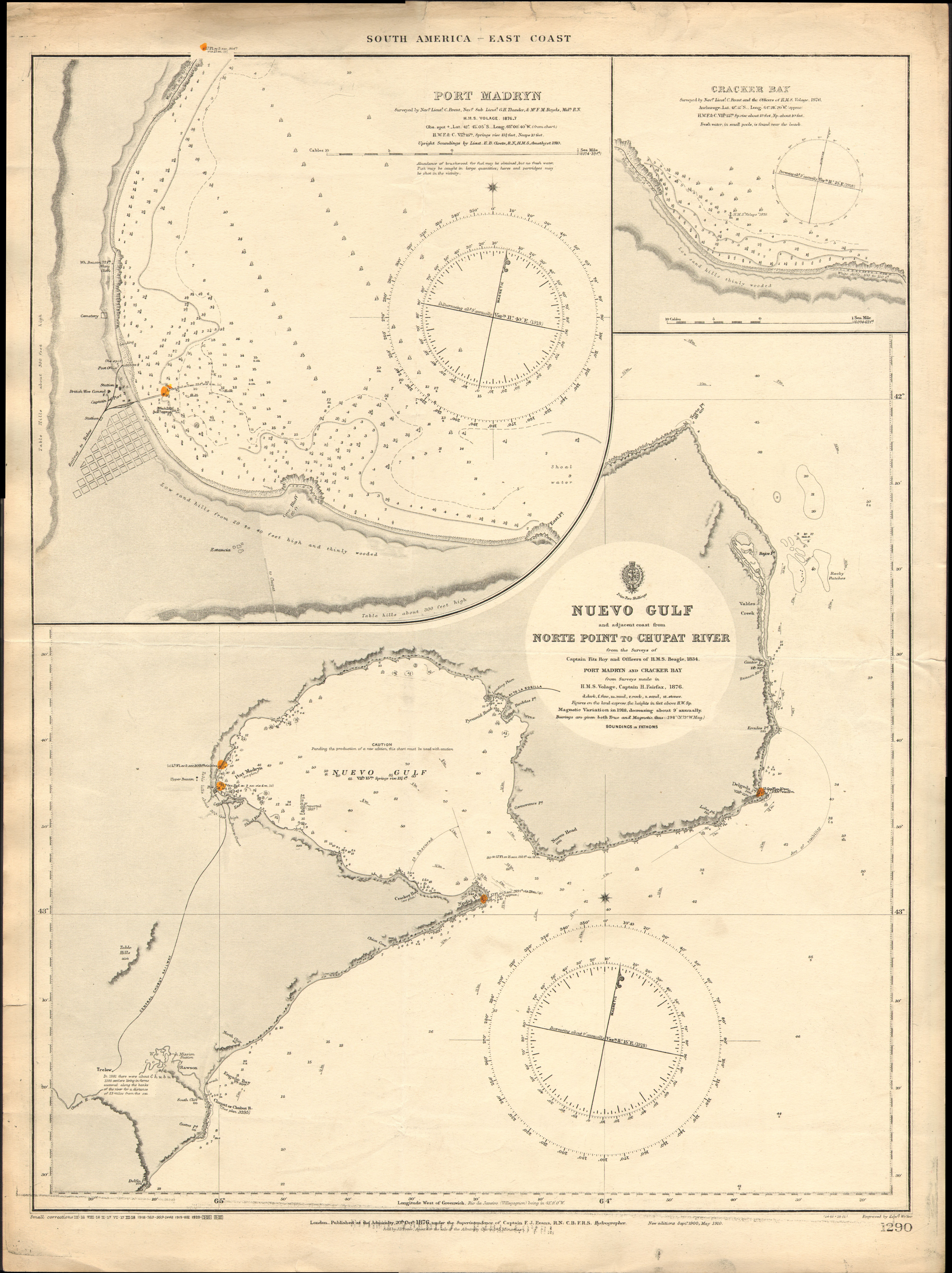
Admiralty Chart of the Gulf from Robert Fitzroy's 1834 survey

The bight was named Bahía Sin Fondo ("Bottomless Bay"; French: Baie Sans Fond or Sansfond) by Ferdinand Magellan when he visited it in 1520. In the 18th century, Welsh colonists renamed it Bahía Nueva (Welsh: Bae Newydd), whence its current name. It was also sometimes known as Bahía de San Matías ("Saint Matthew's Bay"). The gulf was surveyed by Robert Fitzroy in HMS Beagle in 1834. Golfo Nuevo was also the scene of a series of mysterious submarine contacts in 1958 and 1960.
