= Valdés Peninsula =

Peninsula belonging to Argentina

Península Valdés
UNESCO World Heritage Site
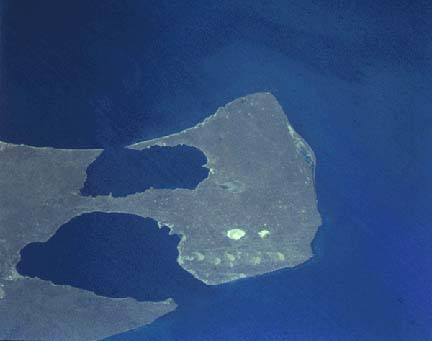
- Peninsula Valdés, photo taken during Space Shuttle program STS-68.

- Location within Chubut Province Location within Argentina
- Location: Biedma Department, Chubut Province, Argentina
- Criteria: Natural: (x)
- Reference: 937
- Inscription: 1999 (23rd Session)
- Area: 360,000 ha (890,000 acres)
- Website: peninsulavaldes.org.ar
- Coordinates: 42°30′S 64°0′W

Ramsar Wetland
- Official name: Humedales de Península Valdés
- Designated: 20 July 2012
- Reference no.: 2070

The Valdés Peninsula (Spanish: Península Valdés) is a peninsula into the Atlantic Ocean in the Viedma Department of northeast Chubut Province, Argentina. It is bordered by San Matías Gulf to the north. It is an important nature reserve which was listed as a World Heritage Site by UNESCO in 1999.

== Geography ==
The peninsula is about 3,625 km^{2} (1,400 sq mi) in size (not taking into account the isthmus of Carlos Ameghino which connects the peninsula to the mainland). The nearest large town is Puerto Madryn. The only town on the peninsula is the small settlement of Puerto Pirámides. There are also a number of estancias, where sheep are raised.

=== Environment ===
Most of the peninsula is barren land with some salt lakes. The largest of these lakes has an elevation of about 40 m below sea level (see extremes on Earth), until recently thought to be the lowest elevation in Argentina and South America (the lowest point actually being Laguna del Carbón, Argentina, which is also the lowest point in all of South America).

=== Wildlife ===
The coastline is inhabited by marine mammals, such as sea lions, elephant seals and fur seals. The adjacent waters contain the most important breeding ground for southern right whales in the world. They can be found in Golfo Nuevo and Golfo San José, protected bodies of water located between the peninsula and the Patagonian mainland. These baleen whales arrive between May and December, for mating and giving birth, because the water in the gulf is quieter and warmer than in the open sea. Orcas can also be found off the coast, in the open sea off the peninsula. They are known to beach themselves on shore to capture sea lions and elephant seals.

The inner part of the peninsula is inhabited by rheas, guanacos and maras. A diverse range of birds lives in the peninsula as well, with at least 181 species recorded, including the Cape petrel. The peninsula, along with neighbouring Punta León and Punta Loma, has been designated an Important Bird Area (IBA) by BirdLife International because it supports significant populations of Magellanic penguins (with about 150,000 breeding pairs), rock and imperial shags, kelp gulls, and South American, Cabot's and royal terns.

=== Climate ===
Valdes Peninsula has a cold desert climate (BWk) bordering on a cold semi-desert climate (BSk). It has a climate typical of northern Patagonia that is modified with interactions between atmospheric circulation patterns and the adjacent ocean. The peninsula is located between the subtropical high-pressure belt (located at 30^{o}S) and the subpolar low-pressure zone (located between 60^{o} and 70^{o}S), resulting in the wind being predominantly from the west. The mean annual temperature is 10.6 °C (51.1 °F), ranging from a mean monthly temperature of 8 °C (46.4 °F) in winter to 18 °C (64.4 °F) in summer. During winter, temperatures fluctuate between 0 and 15 °C (32.0 and 59.0 °F) with frosts being common, averaging 12–20 days during the season. Temperatures in the summer can fluctuate between 15 and 35 °C (59.0 and 95.0 °F).

Mean annual precipitation is low, averaging 240 mm (9.4 in) although this is highly variable from year to year. The interior of the peninsula receives slightly lower precipitation than the coastal areas, receiving 200 to 225 mm (7.9 to 8.9 in) per year. Precipitation is fairly evenly distributed throughout the year though April–June receives the most precipitation. The El Niño Southern Oscillation strongly influences the climate of the peninsula. During an El Niño year, precipitation is higher from November to February.

Climate data for Punta Delgada Lighthouse, Valdes Peninsula
Month	Jan	Feb	Mar	Apr	May	Jun	Jul	Aug	Sep	Oct	Nov	Dec	Year
Record high °C (°F)	35.9 (96.6)	35.6 (96.1)	34.9 (94.8)	30.1 (86.2)	24.5 (76.1)	20.9 (69.6)	17.9 (64.2)	21.9 (71.4)	26.9 (80.4)	30.4 (86.7)	34.9 (94.8)	37.2 (99.0)	37.2 (99.0)
Mean daily maximum °C (°F)	22.8 (73.0)	23.2 (73.8)	21.1 (70.0)	18.6 (65.5)	14.6 (58.3)	12.2 (54.0)	11.2 (52.2)	11.6 (52.9)	13.7 (56.7)	17.2 (63.0)	19.4 (66.9)	21.8 (71.2)	17.3 (63.1)
Daily mean °C (°F)	17.4 (63.3)	17.6 (63.7)	16.1 (61.0)	13.7 (56.7)	10.8 (51.4)	8.2 (46.8)	7.1 (44.8)	7.7 (45.9)	9.2 (48.6)	11.5 (52.7)	13.8 (56.8)	15.7 (60.3)	12.4 (54.3)
Mean daily minimum °C (°F)	13.1 (55.6)	13.3 (55.9)	12.0 (53.6)	10.2 (50.4)	7.0 (44.6)	4.3 (39.7)	3.6 (38.5)	3.2 (37.8)	5.5 (41.9)	7.4 (45.3)	9.8 (49.6)	12.0 (53.6)	8.5 (47.3)
Record low °C (°F)	5.1 (41.2)	5.4 (41.7)	4.3 (39.7)	0.3 (32.5)	−0.1 (31.8)	−3.4 (25.9)	−3.5 (25.7)	−2.9 (26.8)	−4.9 (23.2)	−2.4 (27.7)	1.6 (34.9)	2.7 (36.9)	−4.9 (23.2)
Average precipitation mm (inches)	13.9 (0.55)	10.5 (0.41)	23.5 (0.93)	25.9 (1.02)	25.0 (0.98)	25.2 (0.99)	27.9 (1.10)	14.8 (0.58)	16.5 (0.65)	12.1 (0.48)	13.1 (0.52)	15.1 (0.59)	223.5 (8.80)
Average relative humidity (%)	68.0	68.5	68.5	68.5	72.5	76.5	77.0	72.5	72.5	68.0	69.0	67.5	70.8
Source: Secretaria de Mineria

== Gallery ==
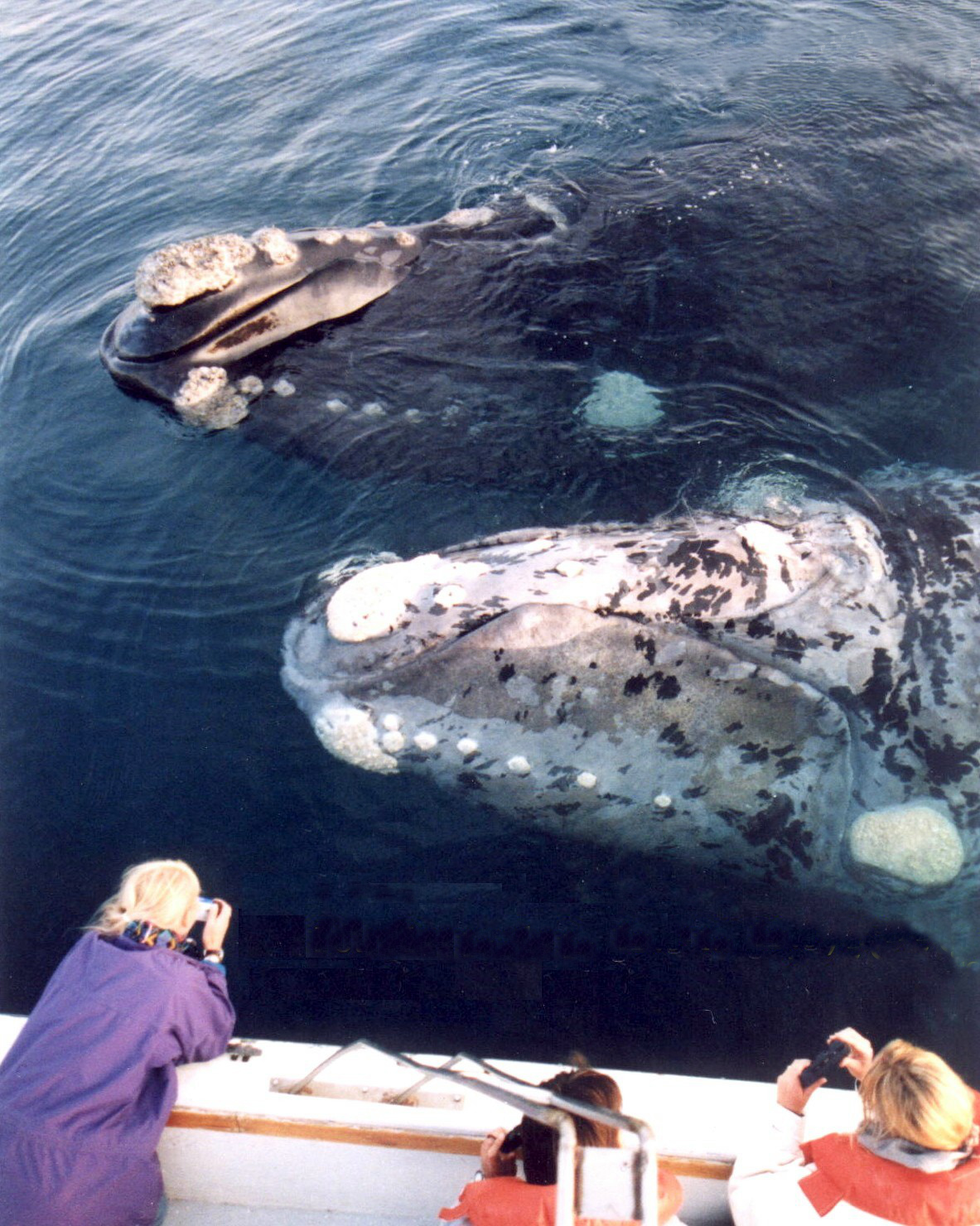
Whale watching

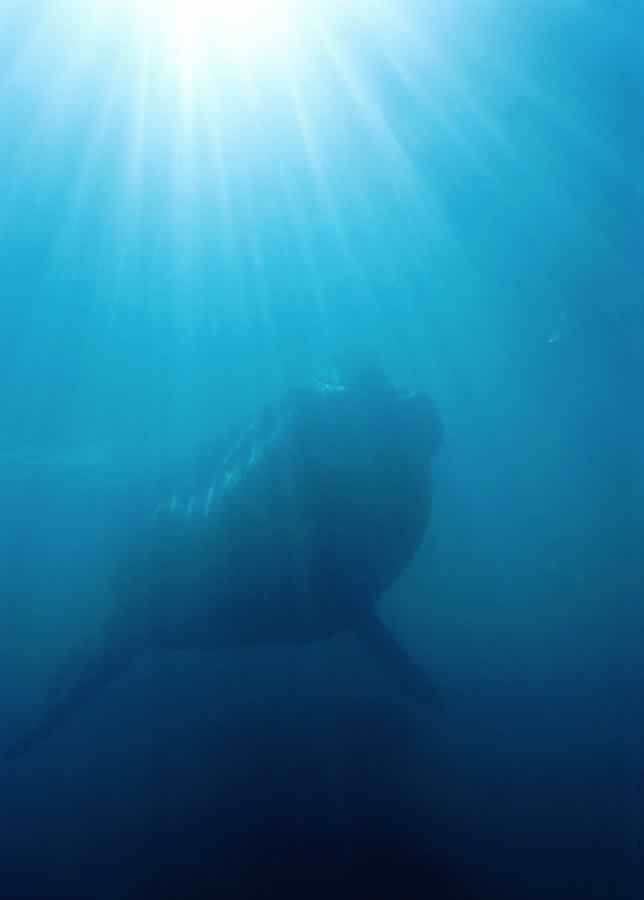
Whale underwater off the peninsula

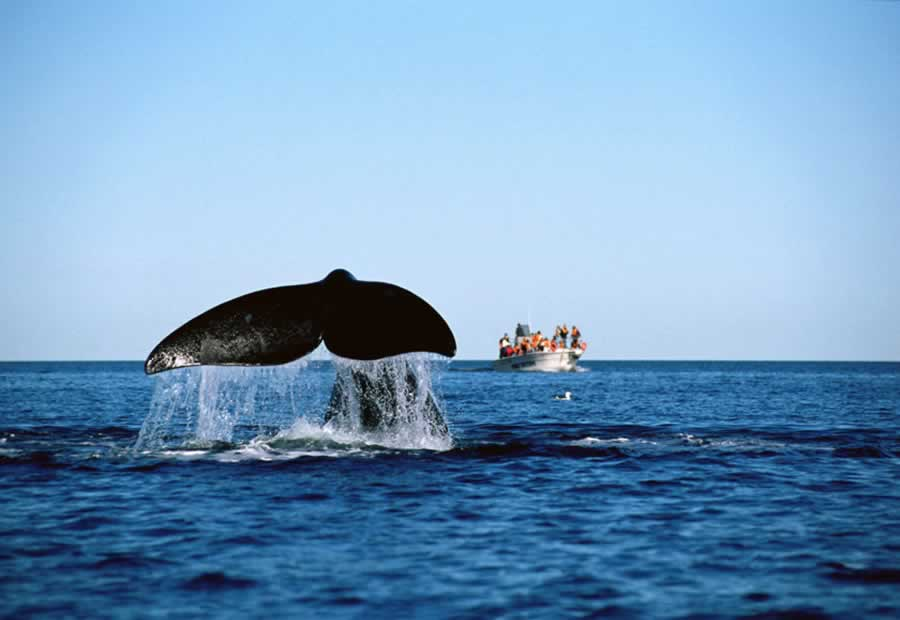
Whale in Valdes Peninsula

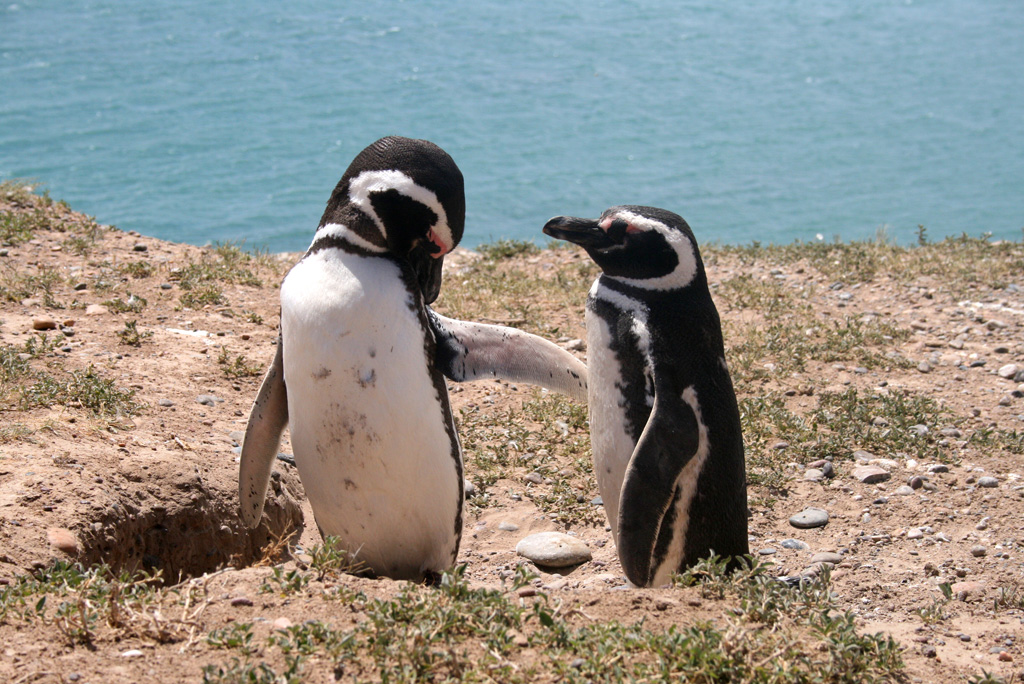
Magellanic penguins

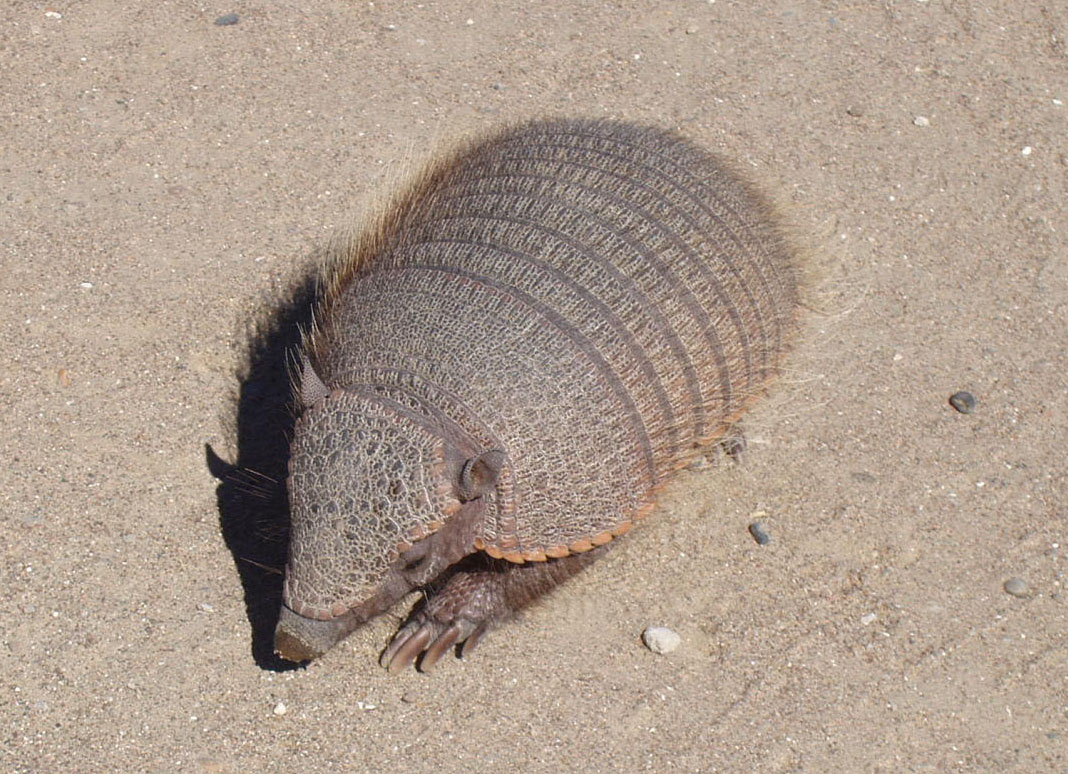
Pichi

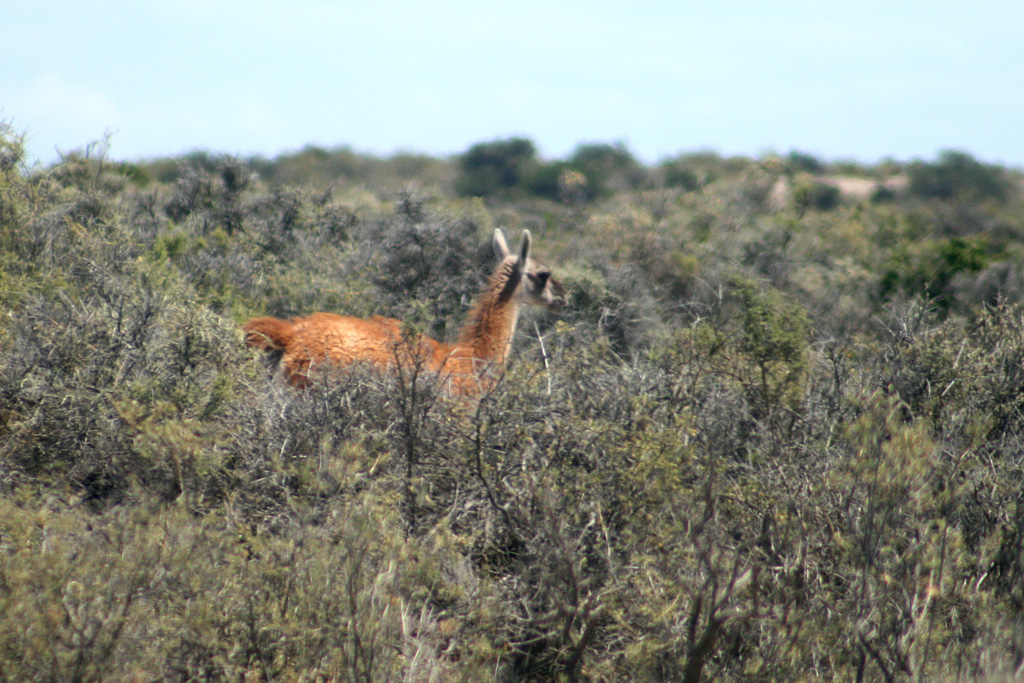
Wild guanaco

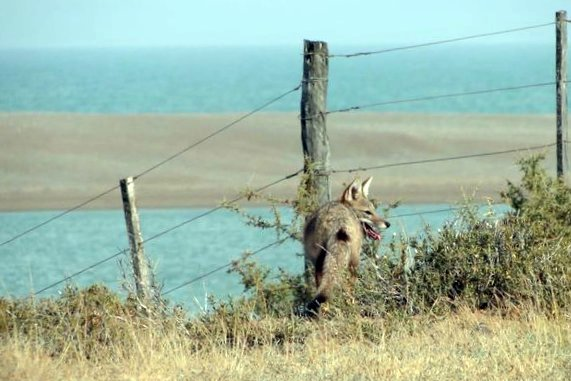
Argentine grey fox

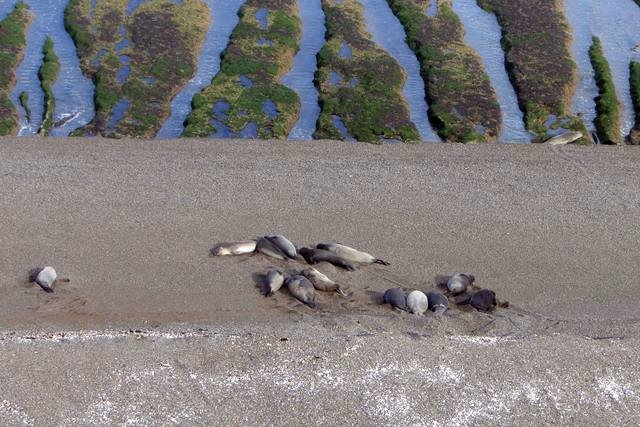
Southern elephant seals

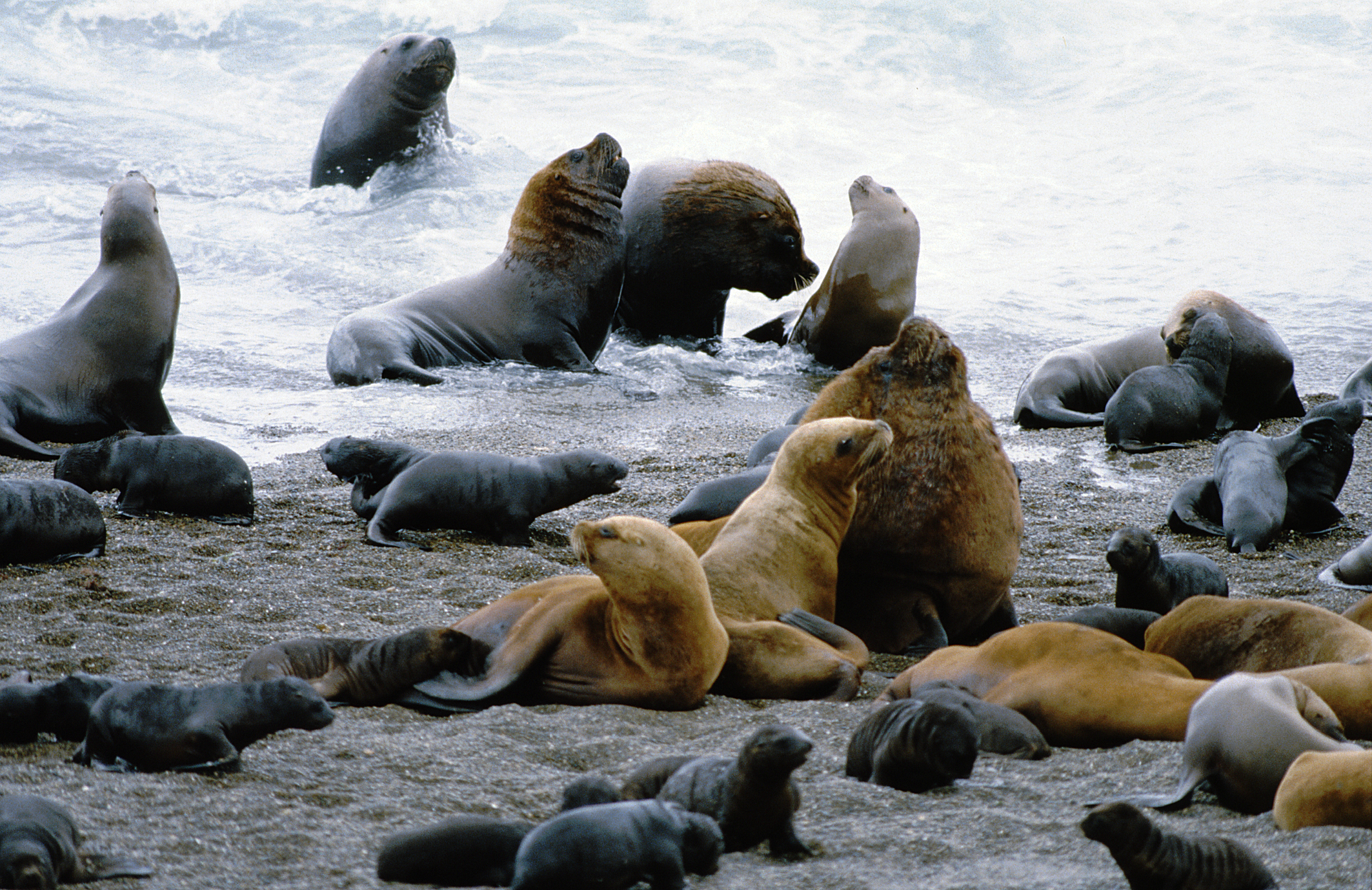
South American sea lions

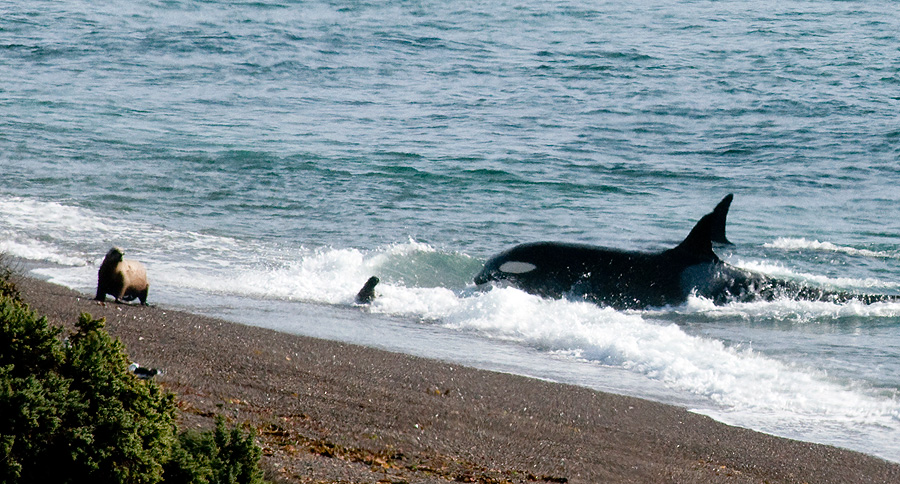
Orca beaching to capture sea lion
