= Guamblin Island =

Island of Chile

Native name: Isla Guamblin
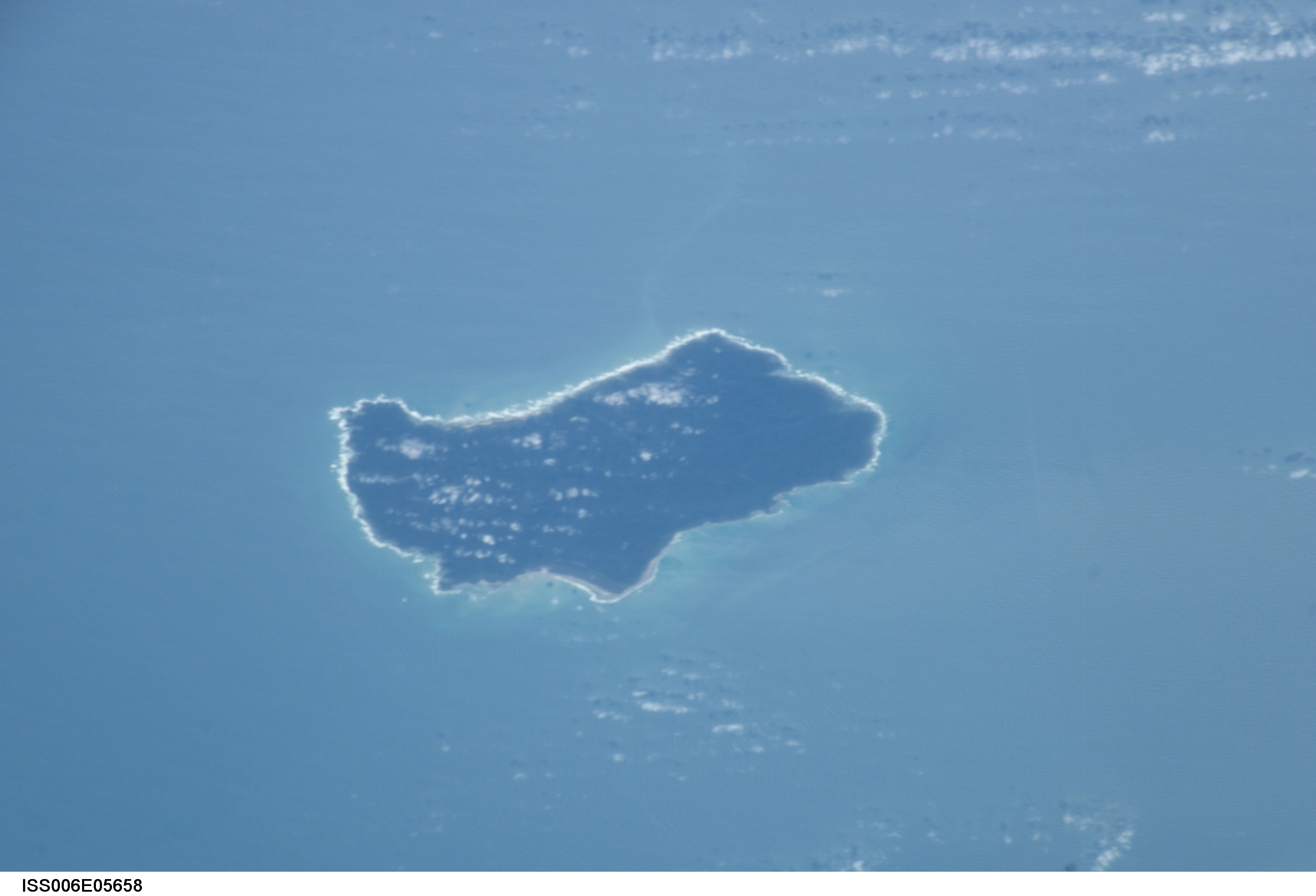
- Guamblin Island

- Location within Chile

Geography
- Coordinates: 44.85°S 75.08°W
- Adjacent to: Pacific Ocean
- Area: 106 km^{2} (41 sq mi)
- Length: 16 km (9.9 mi)N-S
- Width: 8 km (5 mi)W-E
- Highest elevation: 218 m (715 ft)

Administration
- Chile
- Region: Aysén
- Province: Aysén
- Commune: Cisnes

Additional information
- NGA UFI=-883679

Guamblin Island, also known as Socorro Island or Nuestra Señora del Socorro, is a Chilean island located in the Pacific Ocean. The island is designated as a National Park and is recognized as an Important Bird Area. Although Guamblin Island has never been permanently inhabited, it holds historical significance and has been the site of notable events.

== Early history ==
According to experts, Guamblin was occasionally from the 13th or 14th century inhabited temporarily by members of the Chono people. They were a people of hunter-gatherers who lived on the islands in the area and usually moved by canoe.

The island was first seen by Europeans during a Spanish expedition in the years 1557 and 1558. Francisco Cortés Ojea, the commander of one of the ships, named the island Nuestra Señora del Socorro. That is one of the designations of Mary, mother of Jesus.

== A visit by a Dutch ship in 1725 ==
In 1724, the Middelburgsche Commercie Compagnie, a Dutch trading company, dispatched an expedition to the west coast of South America. Two frigates and a smaller ship participated in the expedition. The purpose was to determine whether the company could trade there. Particular attention was paid to the rich silver mines in Peru. To deceive Spanish ships that they might encounter near South America, the three ships were given Spanish-sounding names: Don Carlos, Don Louis and Patache el Mercurio.

From the start, the ships had to contend with unfavorable winds, diseases and other setbacks. Two of the ships failed to pass Cape Horn and sailed back towards the Netherlands. The Don Louis succeeded, but after the difficult passage many members of the crew had died and many others were ill. The ship was leaking and there were hardly any provisions left. On May 22, 1725, the ship anchored at what turned out to be Nuestra Señora del Socorro (Guamblin Island). There was strong surf, but the island could be reached by sloop. As far as could be determined it was uninhabited. In the following days, fresh water and wild celery from the island were transferred to the Don Louis.

On May 30, it was agreed that the ship's steward, Laurens Wartels, and two sailors would stay overnight in a self-built tent on the island so that they had time to collect more vegetables and, if possible, shoot birds. This could be used to make soup for the sick. However, the next day a heavy storm arose, causing most of the ship's anchor ropes to break. It was driven south and eventually ended up in a bay about 120 kilometres (75 mi) from the island. It was not until October 26 that some crew members managed to reach the island again with a small boat. Upon arrival they found the skeletons of the three men left behind. They had apparently succumbed to hunger and cold.

In November, as summer began, the Don Louis sailed north. The ship was seized by the Spanish near Peru. The expedition had ended in complete failure.

== The oil spill incident in 1973 ==
In another unfortunate incident, the Liberian oil tanker Napier ran aground on Guamblin Island in June 1973. This incident resulted in an oil spill of approximately 30,000 metric tons (33,000 short tons) of oil. Following the rescue of the crew, Chilean Hawker Hunters were deployed to set the Napier ablaze and burn off the oil, thereby preventing further pollution.

== National park ==
The island of Guamblín in its entirety has been designated as a national park (Parque Nacional Isla Guamblín) and therefore as a protected nature reserve. It is managed by the Corporación Nacional Forestal. The aim is to protect the biodiversity of flora and fauna and the integrity of the landscape.

Guamblín is, among other things, a breeding ground for the Sooty shearwater (Ardenna grisea), but also for gulls, cormorants and ducks. There is also a large colony of sea lions. The blue whale can be seen between December and April, coming up to about 100 metres (330 ft) from the coast.

The island is largely covered with vegetation, mainly evergreen oceanic trees and shrubs such as the Nothofagus nitida, the Drimys winteri and the Weinmannia trichosperma.

== Accessibility ==
Guamblín is very difficult to reach by boat because mooring is almost impossible due to the roughness of the sea and the rocky coast.

== See also ==
- List of islands of Chile
- Cabo Tamar oil spill
- VLCC Metula oil spill
