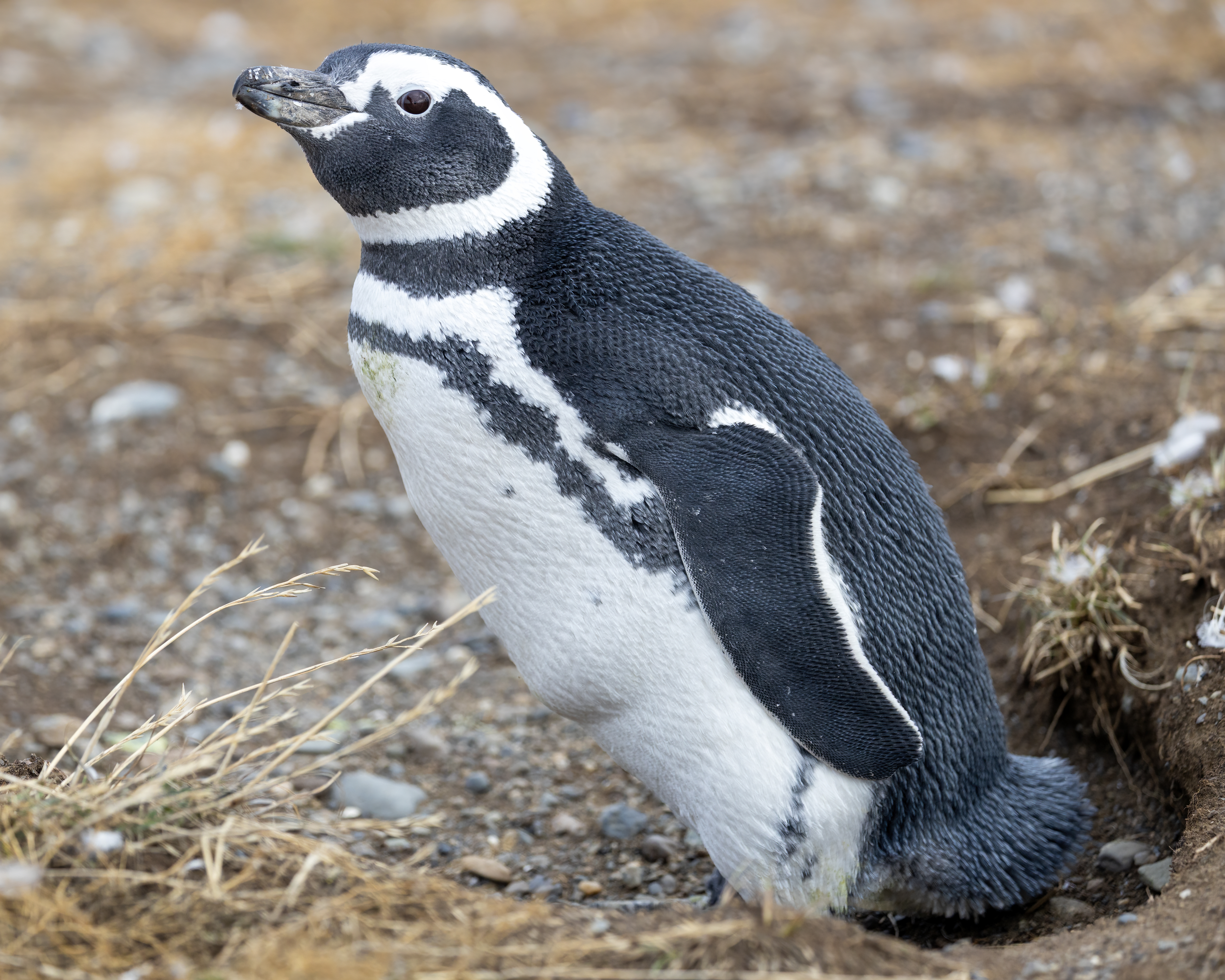
- Non-breeding adult
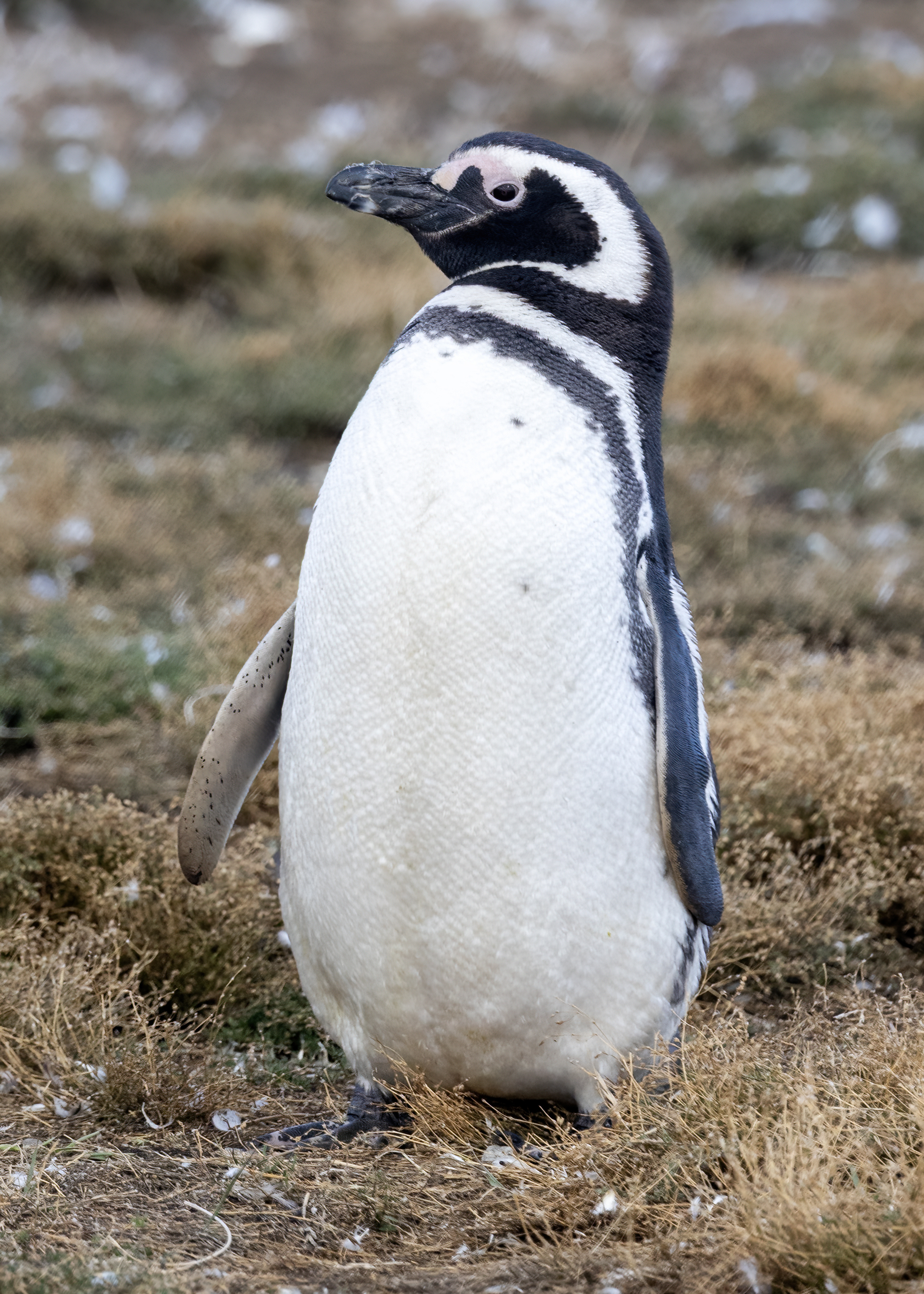
- Breeding adult, showing pink eye patch

Conservation status
- Least Concern (IUCN 3.1)

Scientific classification
- Kingdom: Animalia
- Phylum: Chordata
- Class: Aves
- Order: Sphenisciformes
- Family: Spheniscidae
- Genus: Spheniscus
- Species: S. magellanicus

Binomial name
- Spheniscus magellanicus (Forster, 1781)

= Magellanic penguin =

Species of bird

The Magellanic penguin (Spheniscus magellanicus) is a South American penguin, breeding in coastal Patagonia, including Argentina, Chile, and the Falkland Islands, with some migrating to Brazil and Uruguay, where they are occasionally seen as far north as Espírito Santo. Vagrants have been found in El Salvador, the Avian Island in Antarctica, Australia, and New Zealand. It is the most numerous of the Spheniscus banded penguins. Its nearest relatives are the African penguin, the Humboldt penguin, and the Galápagos penguins. The Magellanic penguin was named after Portuguese explorer Ferdinand Magellan, who spotted the birds in 1520. The species is listed as being of Least Concern by the IUCN.

== Description ==
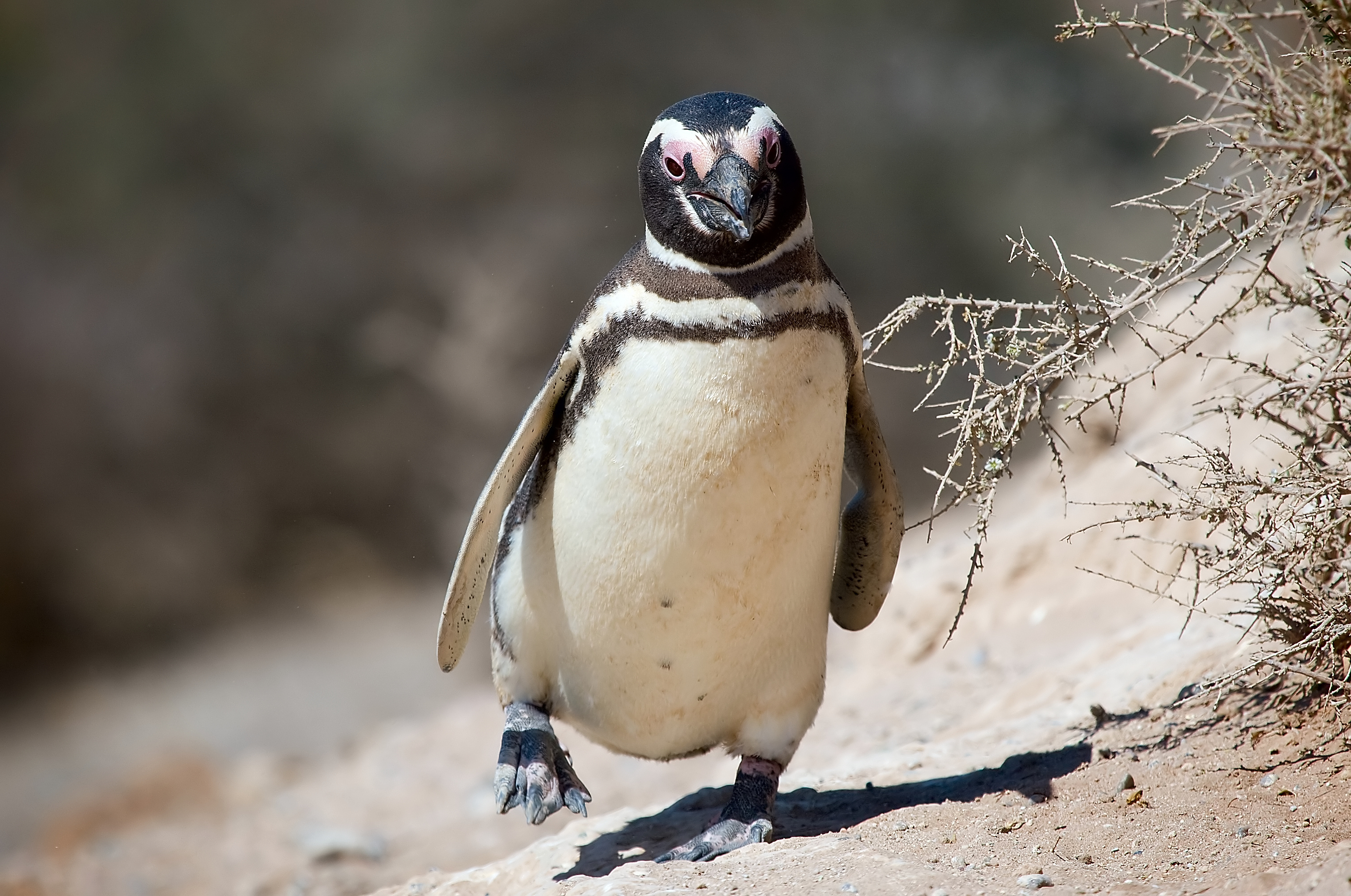
Magellanic penguin on Argentina's coast

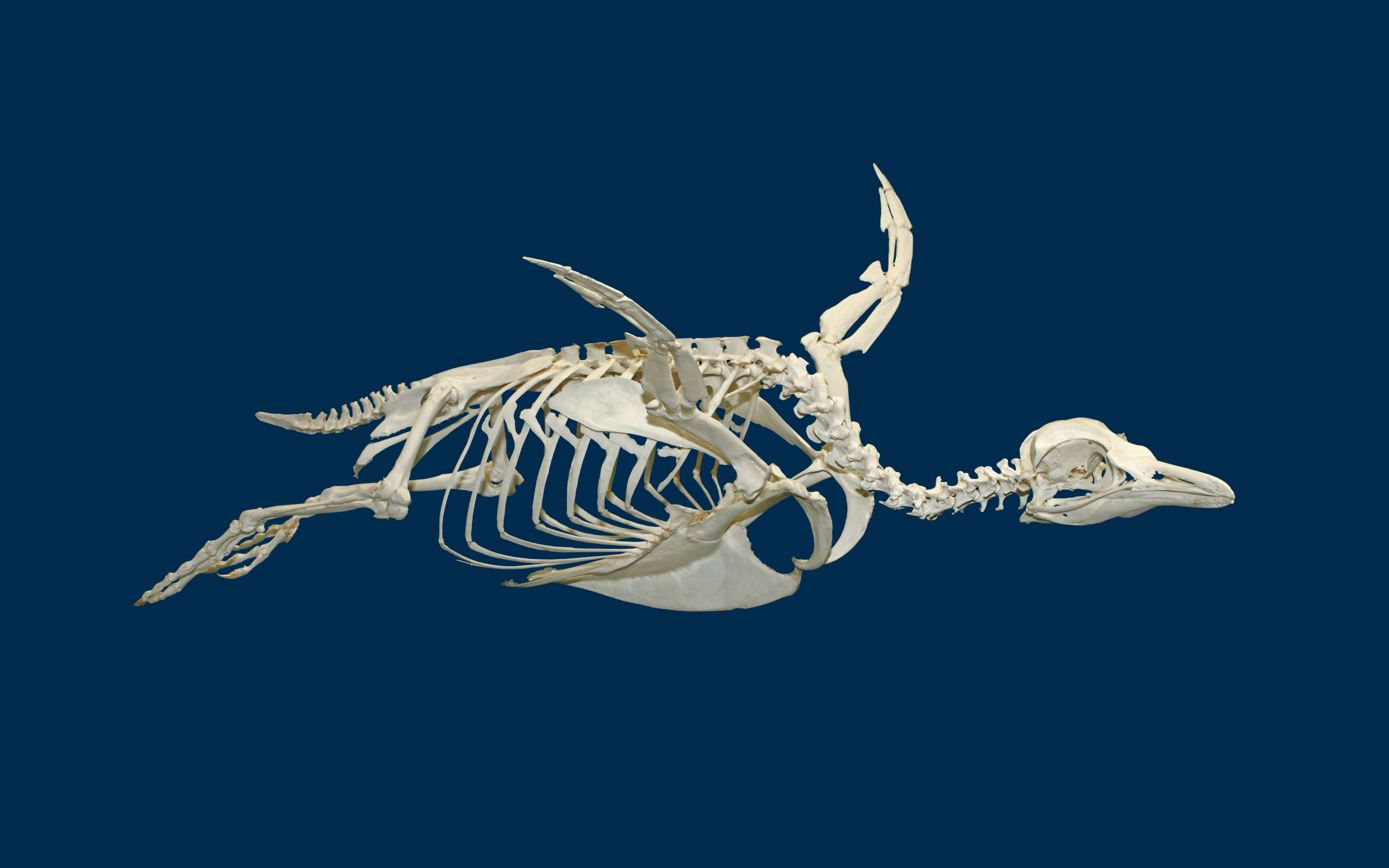
Skeleton of a Magellanic penguin

Magellanic penguins are medium-sized penguins which grow to be 61–76 cm (24–30 in) tall and weigh between 2.7 and 6.5 kg (6.0 and 14.3 lb). The males are larger than the females, and the weight of both drops while the parents raise their young.

Adults have black backs and white abdomens. There are two black bands between the head and the breast, with the lower band shaped in an inverted horseshoe. The head is black with a broad white border that runs from behind the eye, around the black ear-coverts and chin, and joins at the throat. Chicks and younger penguins have grey-blue backs, with a more faded grey-blue colour on their chest. Magellanic penguins can live up to 25 years in the wild, but as much as 30 years in captivity. Captain Eo, a male Magellanic penguin at the San Francisco Zoo, died in 2022 at the age of 40.

Young birds usually have a blotched pattern on their feet, which fades as they grow up into adulthood. By the time these birds reach about ten years of age, their feet usually become all black.

Like other species of penguins, the Magellanic penguin has very rigid wings used to swim under water.

== Diet ==
Magellanic penguins feed in the water, preying primarily on small pelagic fish (Argentine anchoita, silversides, Argentine hake, Falkland sprat, Southern blue whiting, rockcod), hagfish, cuttlefish, squid (Patagonian longfin squid, Gonatus antarcticus, shortfin squid), krill, and squat lobsters, and ingest sea water with their prey. Their salt-excreting gland rids the salt from their bodies. Adult penguins can regularly dive to depths of 20 to 50 m (66 to 164 ft) deep in order to forage for prey. During the breeding season males and females have similar foraging and diving patterns as well as diet composition, however bone tissue analysis suggests that diets diverge post-season when limitations imposed by chick rearing are removed.

Magellanic penguins do not experience a severe shortage of food like the Galapagos penguins, because they have a consistent food supply being located on the Atlantic coast of South America. The presence of the large continental shelf in the Atlantic Ocean lets Magellanic penguins forage far from their breeding colony.

Jellyfish including species in the genera Chrysaora and Cyanea were found to be actively sought-out food items, while they previously had been thought to be only accidentally ingested. Similar preferences were found in the Adélie penguin, yellow-eyed penguin and little penguin.

== Breeding ==
A couple of penguins copulating in their nesting site in Punta Tombo

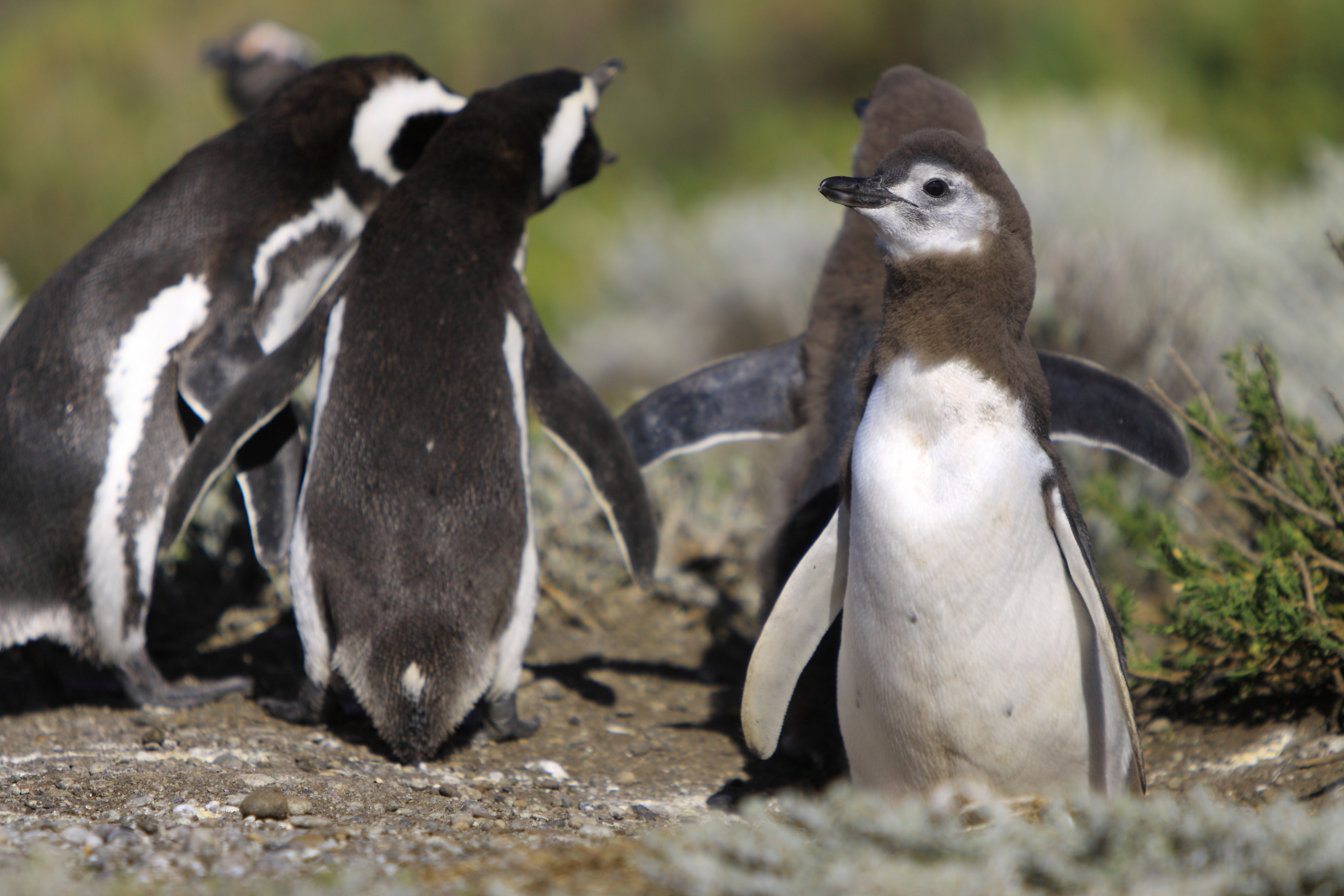
Adults and chicks by their burrow in Cape Virgenes, Patagonia, Argentina

Magellanic penguins travel in large groups when hunting for food. In the breeding season, these birds gather in large nesting colonies at the coasts of Argentina, southern Chile, and the Falkland Islands, which have a density of 20 nests per 100 m^{2} (1,100 sq ft). The breeding season begins with the arrival of adult Magellanic penguins at the breeding colonies in September and extends into late February and March when the chicks are mature enough to leave the colonies. One of the largest of these colonies is located at Punta Tombo. Nests are built under bushes or in burrows.

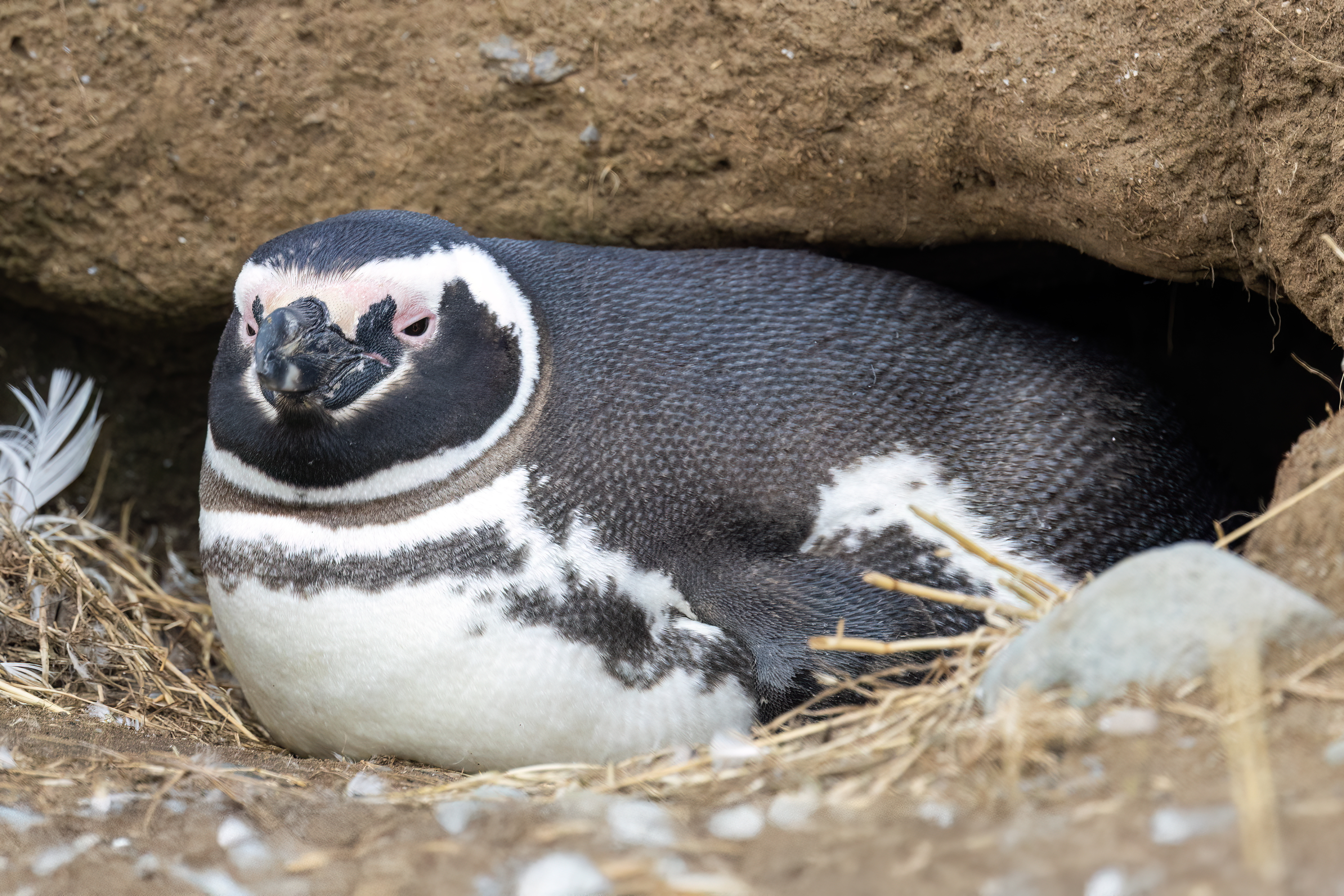
A Magellanic penguin at the entrance of a nest burrow on Magdalena Island in the Strait of Magellan

Two eggs are laid. Incubation lasts 39–42 days, a task which the parents share in 10- to 15-day shifts. The chicks are cared for by both parents for 29 days and are fed every two to three days. Normally, both are raised through adulthood, though occasionally only one chick is raised. A successful Magellanic is considered to be able to raise 0.7 chicks on average per breeding season.

Magellanic penguins lay eggs in warm places where the temperature remains over 20 °C (68 °F).

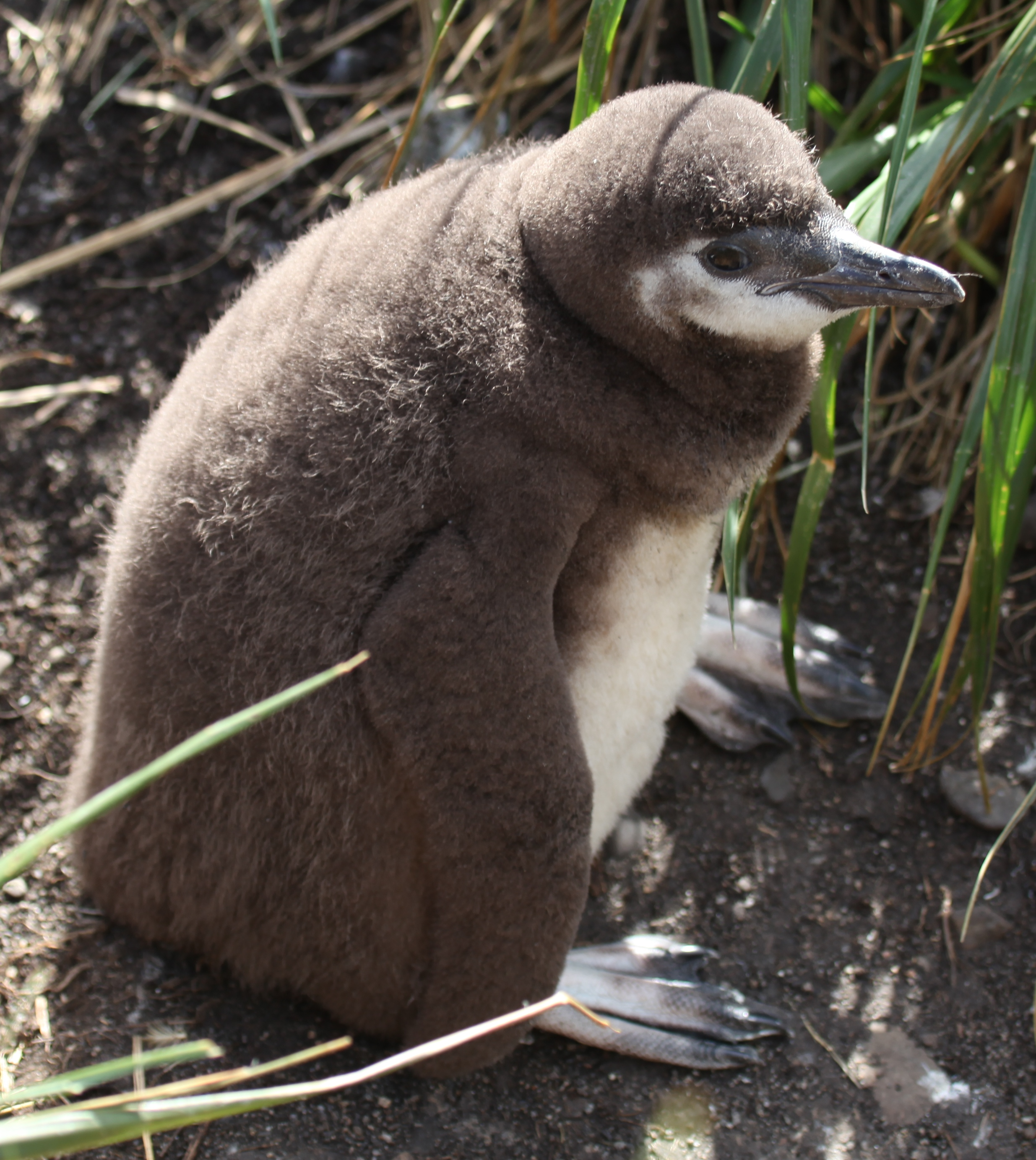
A chick at Isla Martillo in Tierra del Fuego, Argentina

The male and female penguins take turns hatching, as they forage far away from their nests. The males return from the sea on the day the second egg is laid to take their turn incubating The second eggs are generally larger and with higher temperature than the first egg. The first one is more likely to survive, but under some conditions both chicks may be raised successfully. Male and female Magellanic penguins overlap in the at-sea areas they use whilst foraging, and show only small difference in foraging behaviours during early chick-rearing.

Magellanic penguins mate with the same partner year after year. The male reclaims his burrow from the previous year and waits to reconnect with his female partner. The females are able to recognize their mates through their call alone.

Once the breeding season is complete, Magellanic penguins migrate north for the winter, where they feed in waters offshore from Peru and Brazil.

== Conservation status ==
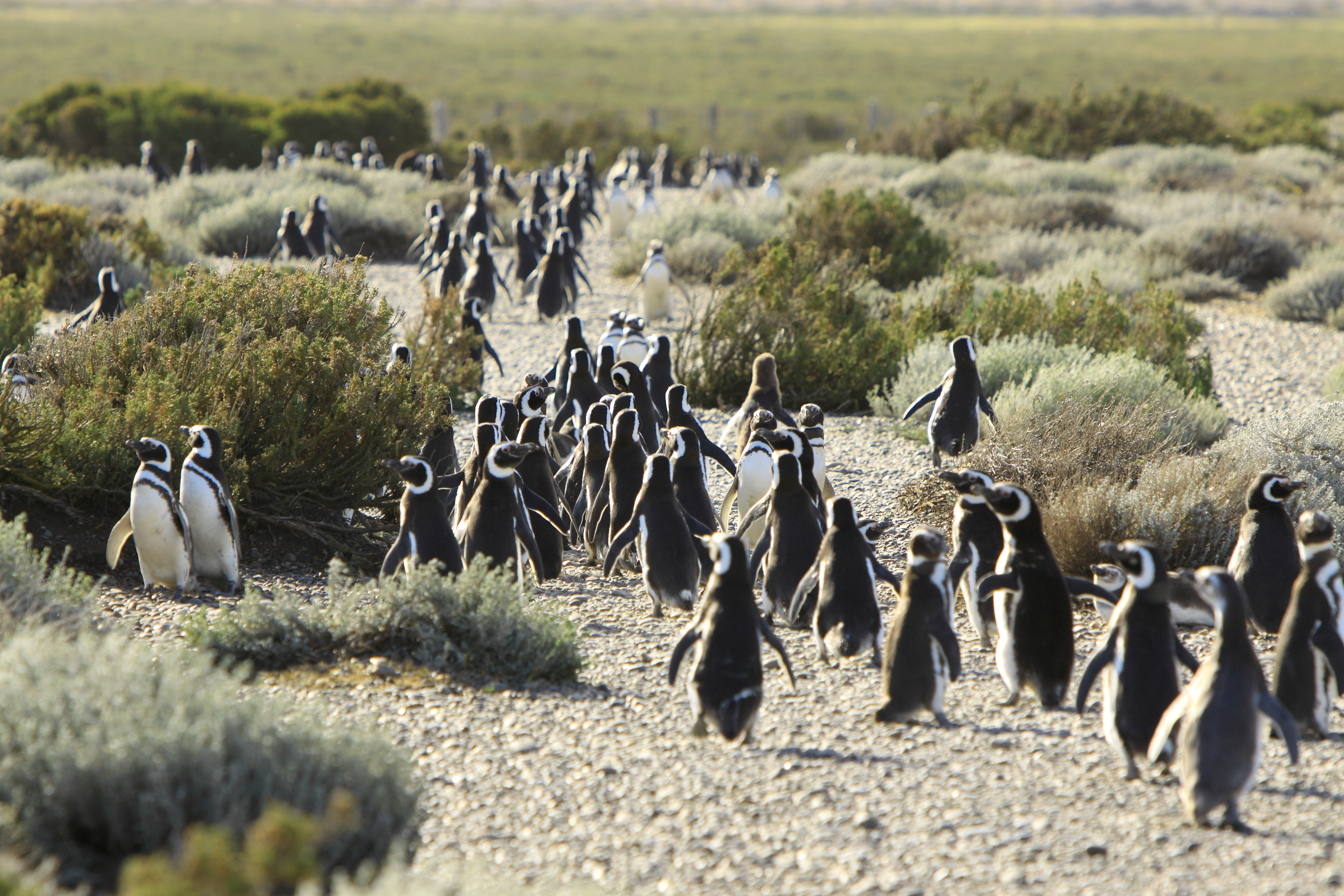
Magellanic penguins at the Strait of Magellan near the archaeological site of Nombre de Jesús

The species is classified as Least Concern and decreasing.

== Threats ==
Magellanic penguin populations face various pressures, including exposure to reported and unreported oil spills, changes in prey availability and climate change. Natural predation occurs by sea lions, giant petrels, and leopard seals which prey on the chicks. The warrah preyed on the penguin prior to its extinction. Its major predator, however, is the puma, which can also take adults; penguins constitute the majority of prey items in puma diet in Patagonia's Bosques Petrificados de Jaramillo National Park and Monte León National Park.

Human interactions can also cause stress to penguin chicks. Newly hatched chicks that are visited by tourists show a stress response, with elevated levels of corticosterone in their blood. The elevated corticosterone is detrimental to the development of muscle strength, growth, and immune function.

=== Oil spills ===
Large breeding colonies are vulnerable to oil spills, which kill 20,000 adults and 22,000 juveniles every year off the coast of Argentina. Chronic pollution by unreported oil discharges made at sea by international shipping is a persistent problem, particularly in the Strait of Magellan.

In Chile, the species is also exposed to oil spills from shipping. Chilean oil spills impacting penguins include spills from the Napier (1973) the VLCC Metula (1974), the Jose Fuchs (2001) and the tanker Berge Nice (2004). The species is also exposed to spills which occur in other countries as penguins follow their annual migratory paths. In 2008, at least 72 Magellanic penguins were oiled and killed near Montevideo, Uruguay after a spill from the oil tanker Syros. After the event, oiled penguins were also found in Brazil, along with others in weakened or malnourished condition, which prompted speculation about the Uruguayan oil spill's impact on prey availability.

Exposure to oil can reduce penguins' immunity and make them vulnerable to fungus, bacteria and lung problems.

Zoo representatives from around the world have adopted Magellanic penguin hatchlings and bred them in captivity, which serves to build insurance populations (though these animals are unable to participate in seasonal migration events or forage for prey, unlike wild populations).

=== Climate change ===
Climate change has displaced fish populations, causing some Magellanic penguins to swim an extra 40 km (25 miles) further from their nests to catch fish. While the penguins are swimming an extra 80 km (50 miles), their mates are sitting on a nest, unable to feed. A colony being tracked by University of Washington professor P. Dee Boersma, about 1,600 km (1,000 miles) south of Buenos Aires, has fallen by more than 20 percent in the past 22 years, leaving 200,000 breeding pairs. Some younger penguins are now moving their breeding colonies north to be closer to fish, but, in some cases, this is putting them on private, unprotected lands. As a result of these changes, some penguins are known to have been lost or confused. At present, 12 of 17 penguin species are experiencing rapid population declines. A recent study of professor Dee Boersma showed that an increase of rainstorms caused by climate change affecting weather patterns has had a large impact in the chicks' population. The chicks have not yet grown waterproof feathers so they are more likely to die of hypothermia when they get wet during big storms.

Increased frequency of extreme events, such as storms, drought, temperature extremes, and wildfires, associated with climate change, increases the reproductive failure in Magellanic penguins.

=== Mass mortalities ===
In 2008, over 400 penguins were found dead on Rio de Janeiro beaches. That year, 100 had also been received by the Niteroi Zoo in an oiled condition and in need of treatment.

In 2010, 550 penguins were found on Brazil's coastline. They were believed to have starved to death. In June 2012, higher numbers were recorded, with 742 Magellanic penguins discovered in a decomposed state on the shores of Brazil. The causes of death were investigated. The birds were young and "natural causes" were assumed. Prior to 2010, only roughly 10 dead penguins would be expected to be found ashore in a typical year.

In early March 2022, 115 penguins were found dead in the coast next to Toltén River, southern Chile. Besides the penguins 104 white-chinned petrel, five guanay cormorant, one Chilean dolphin and one South American sea lion were found dead.

In July 2023, more than 2000 dead penguins were washed up on the shores of Uruguay. According to Uruguayan authorities, 90% of these were juveniles without fat reserves and with empty stomachs. All carcasses tested negative for avian influenza. Other dead seabirds, sea turtles and sea lions were found on the coast of the Maldonado Department.

== Conservation ==
The provincial government of Chubut is committed to the creation of a marine protected area in order to protect the penguins and other marine species near the largest Magellanic breeding colony. The creation of a marine protected area would likely improve the breeding success of the colonies as well as increase prey availability, reduce foraging distance, and increase feeding frequency.

== In popular culture ==
In 2016, videos of a Magellanic penguin who had befriended a Brazilian fisherman went viral. The fisherman had found the penguin close to death and covered in oil, and had nursed it back to health. In 2024, a movie of the story, My Penguin Friend, was released.

The Penguin Lessons is a 2024 comedy-drama film that centers on a Magellanic penguin rescued from an oil slick.
