= Lomonosov (disambiguation) =

Mikhail Lomonosov was a Russian polymath, scientist and writer.

Lomonosov (Russian: Ломоно́сов) may also refer to:

- Lomonosov (surname), including a list of people with the surname
- Lomonosov, Russia (formerly Oranienbaum), a town in Russia
- Lomonosov Moscow State University, university in Moscow, Russia
- Lomonosov Bridge in Saint Petersburg, Russia
- Lomonosov diamond mine in Russia
- Lomonosov Gold Medal, annual award given by the Russian Academy of Sciences
- Akademik Lomonosov, Russian non-self-propelled vessel
- Mikhailo Lomonosov (satellite), Russian scientific satellite
- Lomonosov porcelain: renaming of the Imperial Porcelain Factory, Saint Petersburg from 1925 to 2005

== Geographical features ==
- Lomonosovfonna, ice cap on Spitsbergen, Svalbard
- Lomonosov Ridge in the Arctic Ocean
- Lomonosov Current in the Atlantic Ocean
- Lomonosov Group, volcanic group in the Kuril Islands
- Lomonosov Mountains in Antarctica

== Craters ==
- Lomonosov (lunar crater), lunar crater located just behind the western limb of the Moon, named after polymath
- Lomonosov (Martian crater), medium crater on Mars, named after polymath

== See also ==
- M. V. Lomonosov School of Electrotechnics and Electronics
