= Tsvetana =

Tsvetana or Tzvetana (Bulgarian: Цветана) is a feminine given name found among Bulgarian people. It comes from the word for "flower" in Bulgarian, and it is the feminine form of the masculine name Tsvetan.

Variations of the name: Tsvetina, Tsvetelina, Tsvetomira, Tsvetoslava, Tsvetanka, Tsveta.

Notable people with this given name include:

== Sportspeople ==
- Tzvetana Berkovska (1933–2003), Bulgarian sprinter
- Tsvetana Bozhilova (born 1968), Bulgarian judo practitioner
- Tsvetana Bozhurina (born 1952), Bulgarian volleyball player
- Tsvetana Pironkova (born 1987), Bulgarian tennis player
- Tsvetana Sotirova (born 1939), Bulgarian cross-country skier

== Other ==
- Tzvetana Maneva (born 1944), Bulgarian actress
- Tsvetana Jermanova (born 1928), a Bulgarian anarchist and labor camp survivor
- Tsvetana Paskaleva (born 1960), an Armenian-Bulgarian journalist and documentary filmmaker
