= Tsvetan =

Tsvetan (Bulgarian: Цветан) is a masculine given name derived from 'цвет' (latinized: tsvet) meaning 'flower, blossom'. It may refer to:

- Tsvetan Atanasov (born 1948), Bulgarian football player
- Tsvetan Dimitrov (born 1987), Bulgarian football player
- Tsvetan Filipov (born 1988), Bulgarian football player
- Tsvetan Gashevski (born 1970), Bulgarian arm wrestler
- Tsvetan Genkov (born 1984), Bulgarian football player
- Tsvetan Iliev (born 1990), Bulgarian football player
- Tsvetan Krastev (born 1978), Bulgarian football player and referee
- Tsvetan Radoslavov (1863–1931), Bulgarian teacher and author of the current national anthem of Bulgaria
- Tsvetan Sokolov (born 1989), Bulgarian volleyball player
- Tsvetan Todorov (1939–2017), Franco-Bulgarian philosopher
- Tsvetan Tsvetanov (born 1965), Bulgarian politician
- Tsvetan Vasilev (born 1959), banker
- Tsvetan Veselinov (1947–2018), footballer
- Tsvetan Yonchev (born 1956), footballer
- Tsvetan Yotov (born 1989), Bulgarian football player
- Tsvetan Ivanov (born 1967), Bulgarian model

== See also ==
- Tsvetochny
- Tsvety
