= Lomonosovsky District =

Location of Leningrad Oblast in Russia

Location of Moscow in Russia

Lomonosovsky District is the name of several administrative and municipal districts in Russia. The districts are generally named for Mikhail Lomonosov, a Russian polymath.

== Districts of the federal subjects ==
- Lomonosovsky District, Leningrad Oblast, an administrative and municipal district of Leningrad Oblast
- Lomonosovsky District, Moscow, a district in South-Western Administrative Okrug of Moscow

== City divisions ==
Location of Arkhangelsk in Russia
- Lomonosovsky Territorial Okrug, a territorial okrug of the city of Arkhangelsk, the administrative center of Arkhangelsk Oblast

== Historical districts ==
- Lomonosovsky District, a former district of the federal city of St. Petersburg; since 2003—a part of Petrodvortsovy District

== See also ==
- Lomonosov (disambiguation)
