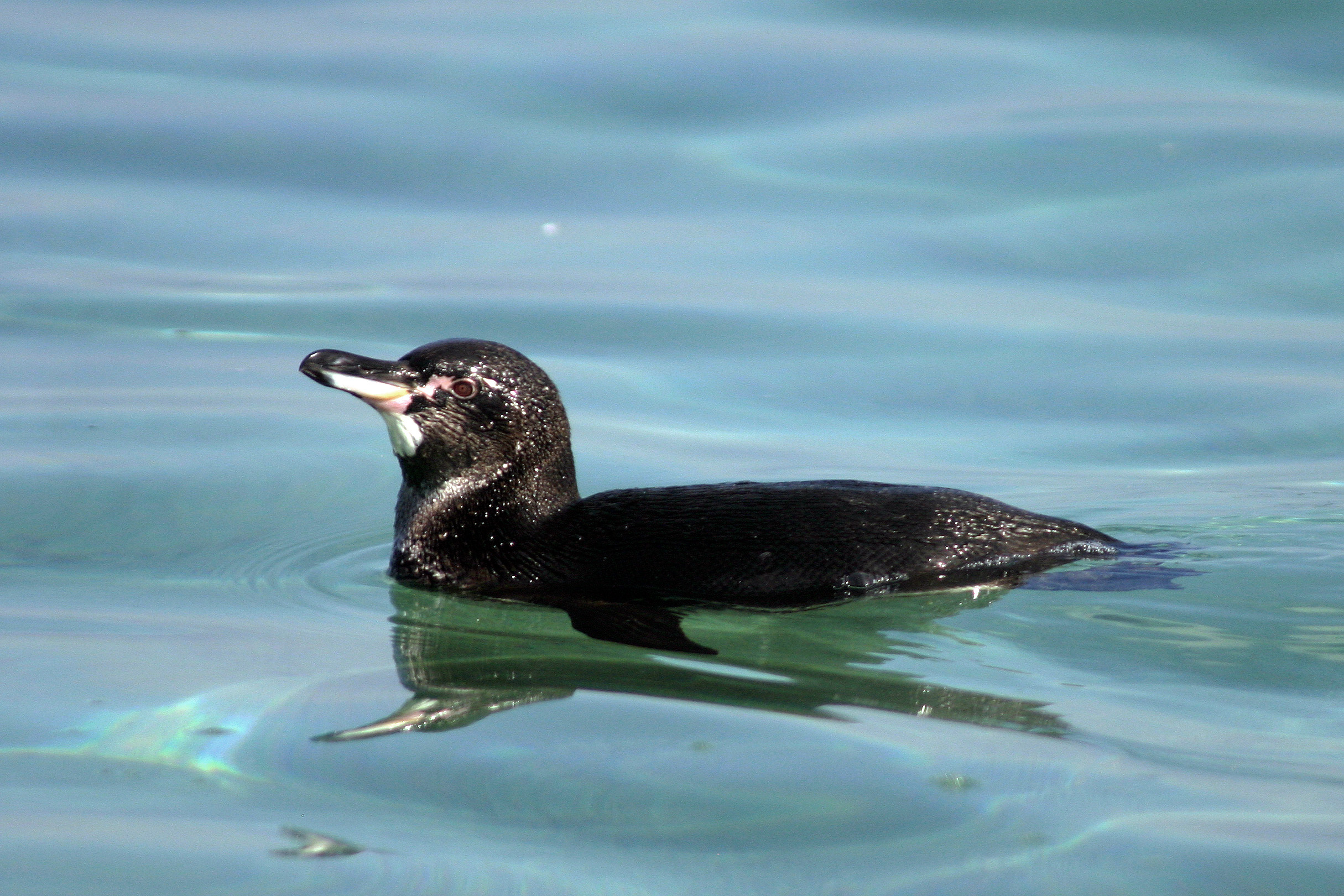
- Male swimming off the coast of Isabela Island near Moreno Point, Galápagos Islands

Conservation status
- Endangered (IUCN 3.1)

Scientific classification
- Kingdom: Animalia
- Phylum: Chordata
- Class: Aves
- Order: Sphenisciformes
- Family: Spheniscidae
- Genus: Spheniscus
- Species: S. mendiculus

Binomial name
- Spheniscus mendiculus Sundevall, 1871
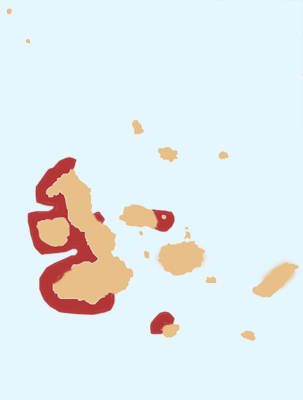
- Distribution of the Galápagos penguin

= Galapagos penguin =

Galápagos penguin Temporal range: Pliocene to recent

Species of bird

The Galápagos penguin (Spheniscus mendiculus) is a penguin endemic to the Galápagos Islands of Ecuador. It is the only penguin found north of the equator. Most inhabit Fernandina Island and the west coast of Isabela Island. The cool waters of the Humboldt and Cromwell Currents allow it to survive despite the tropical latitude. The Galápagos penguin is one of the banded penguins, the other species of which live mostly on the coasts of Africa and mainland South America. Due to their warm environment, Galápagos penguins have developed techniques to stay cool. The feathers on their back, flippers, and head are black, and they have a white belly and a stripe looping from their eyes down to their neck and chin. Each penguin keeps only one mate, and breeds year-round. Because there are no soft areas to nest, their nests are typically in caves and crevices which also provide protection against predators and the harsh environment. The Galápagos penguin has a lifespan of 20 years, but due to predation, life expectancy in the wild could be significantly reduced. They have been critically impacted to the point of endangerment by climate change and pollution caused by plastic waste due to tourism and urbanization.

== Description ==
The average Galápagos penguin is 48–50 centimetres (19–20 in) tall and weighs around 2–4 kilograms (4.4–8.8 lb). It is the second-smallest species of penguin, after the little penguin. Females are usually smaller than males. Galápagos penguins have a black head with a white border running from behind the eye, around the black ear coverts and chin, to join on the throat. The top of the beaks are black and fade into pink on the bottom. They have two black bands across the breast that connect to the back, the lower band extending down the flanks to the thigh. Juveniles differ in having a wholly dark head, grayer on side and chin, and no breast band.

== History ==
The Galápagos penguin is believed to have originated from ancestral banded penguins 1.8 million years ago that dispersed from mainland South America to the Galápagos Islands via the Humboldt current. Geographic isolation within the archipelago allowed the population to evolve into a distinct species. Islands such as Isabela Island contained cold and nutrient-rich waters that provided abundant food, ensuring survival and reproduction of the penguins. The cool waters of the Humboldt Current and Cromwell Current continue to provide the nutrients that support the marine food web Galápagos penguins depend on. Over time, the species developed behavioral and physical adaptations that allow it to survive in a tropical environment, including specialized thermoregulation strategies and a strong dependence on cool ocean currents. Today, the Galápagos penguins are among the smallest penguins species.

== Distribution ==
Approximately 95% of the Galapagos penguin population occurs on Fernandina Island and the western coast of Isabela Island, in the western part of the Galapagos archipelago. These islands are influenced by the Cromwell Current, which brings cold, nutrient-rich water to the surface and supports the marine food web on which the penguins depend. The remaining population is distributed among smaller breeding sites elsewhere in the archipelago. The species' distribution is closely associated with the availability of suitable coastal habitat and food, both of which can vary with oceanographic conditions.

== Behavior ==
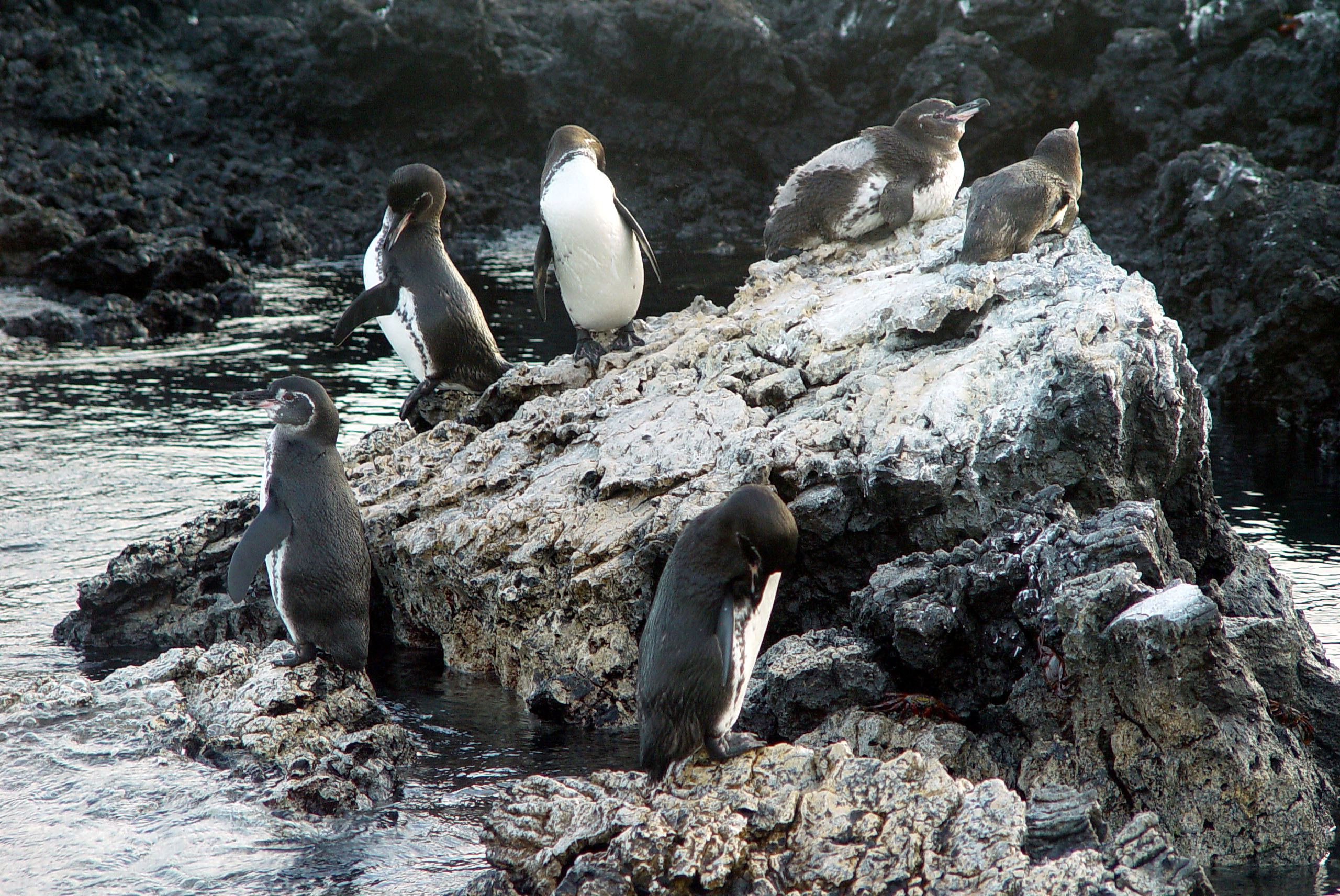
A colony of Galápagos penguins together on a rock in the Galápagos Islands. One penguin can be seen molting.

Galápagos penguins are confined to the Galápagos Islands, foraging in the cool Cromwell Current during the day and returning to the land at night. They eat small schooling fish, mainly mullet, sardines, pilchards and anchovies, and sometimes crustaceans. They play a role in regulating the populations of the marine species they consume. At the same time, the adult Galápagos penguins are a food source for other predators such as sharks and whales. They normally range only a few kilometers from their breeding sites, and depend on the cold, nutrient-rich currents to bring them food.

Air temperatures in the Galápagos remain in the range 15–28 °C (59–82 °F). During El Niño seasons, the penguins defer breeding; their food becomes less abundant, which makes the chance of successfully raising offspring unfavorable compared to the chance of dying in the attempt. This was especially detrimental during the 1982-83 El Niño, when a 77% decline in their population was observed. The penguins usually breed when the sea surface temperature is below 25 °C (77 °F). The strong tropical sun is problematic for this species. Their primary means of cooling off is going in the water, but other behavioral adaptations for thermoregulation come into play when they must remain on land. One method involves stretching out their flippers and hunching forward to keep the sun from shining on their feet, which exchange heat rapidly because they have high blood flow and lack insulation. Another method is to pant, using evaporation to cool the throat and airways. Galápagos penguins protect their eggs and chicks from the hot sun by keeping them in deep crevices in the rocks.

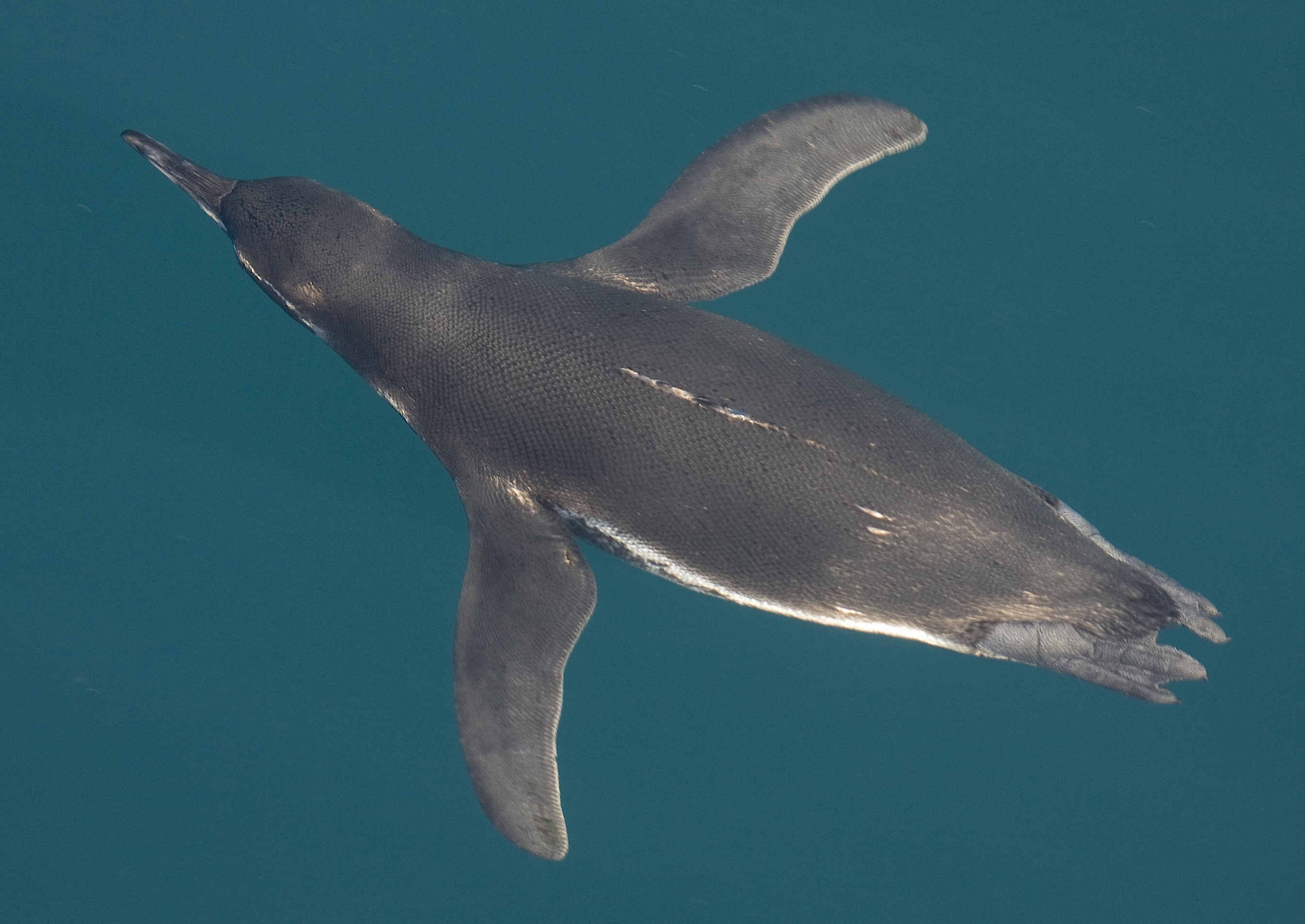
Galápagos penguin swimming in water

The Galápagos penguins' flipper-like wings and streamlined bodies enhance their easy movements in water. Their white and black colors also aid in thermal regulation and camouflaging. All these features promote and ensure survival in the harsh conditions present in their coastal habitat, hence the symbiotic relationship between the Galápagos penguins and their natural environment. The penguins' breeding patterns depend on finding suitable nesting places within the volcanic landscape. The Galápagos penguins find refuge in the cool and dark lava caves, which provide the appropriate conditions for raising their offspring since they offer protection from the sun, ensuring survival. This indicates specific behavioral patterns and features that enhance their adaptability in this particular environment.

=== Breeding and reproduction ===
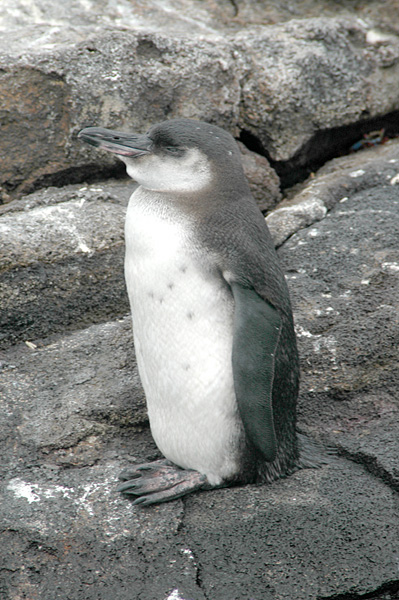
Juvenile before it has banding markings

Galápagos penguins are a monogamous species, each pair mating for life. There are around 1,000 breeding pairs of Galápagos penguins in the world, and breeding depends on certain climate events. During El Niño, birds may not breed due to these climate conditions. After completing courtship, with rituals including bill dueling, flipper patting, and mutual preening, the pair will build and maintain a nest. Most nests are seen between May and July because both quantity of food and climate conditions are typically most optimal. The nests are made within 50 metres (160 ft) of the water on the shore. Adults stay near the breeding area during the year with their mate. It lays one or two eggs in places such as caves and crevices, protected from direct sunlight, which can cause the eggs to overheat. Temperature of surface water also influences reproduction as they prefer temperatures between 17 and 22 °C (63 and 72 °F) to incubate, above 25 °C (77 °F) causes their nests to fail. Incubation takes 38–40 days, with both parents incubating.

One parent will always stay with the eggs or young chicks while the other may be absent for several days to feed. A pair usually rears only one chick. Galápagos penguins will molt before they breed, and are the only penguins to do this twice a year. Molting takes up to 15 days to complete. They do this for their own safety, as food availability in the Galápagos is typically unpredictable. If there is not enough food available, they may abandon the nest.

It takes about 60–65 days for the chicks to become independent. Newly hatched chicks have downy feathers that do not become waterproof until the chicks grow into juveniles. The juvenile plumage, attained by thirty days after a chick hatches, is dark brown or gray above and white below. These feathers are mainly needed to protect the chicks from the strong sun rather than keep them warm.

Bermudian naturalist Louis L. Mowbray was the first to successfully breed the Galápagos penguins in captivity.

=== Population ===
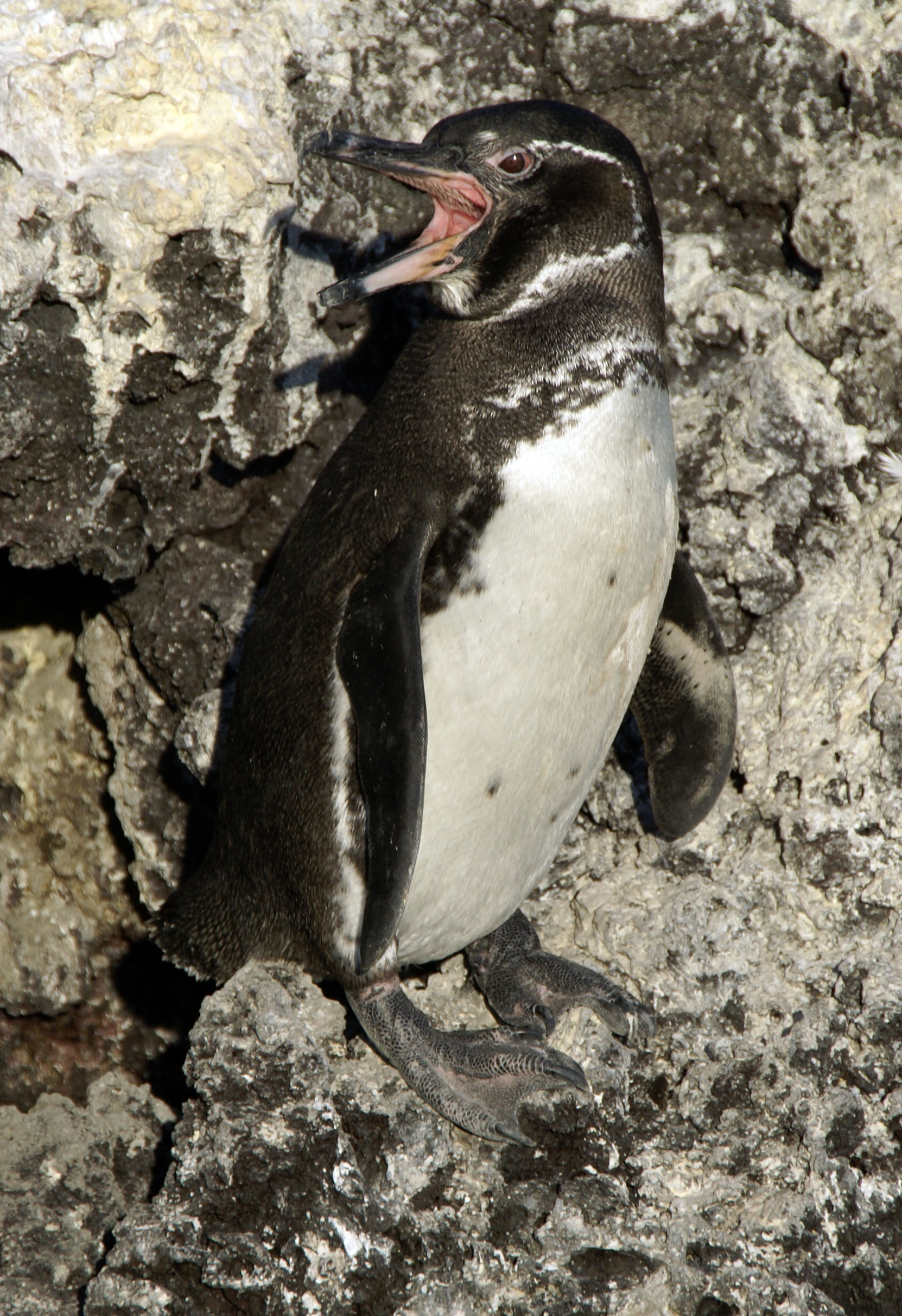
Adult penguin on Isabela Island

Galápagos penguins have a lifespan ranging from 15 to 20 years, but because of environmental factors and predation, their life expectancy is reduced. They are listed on the IUCN Red List of Threatened Species as Endangered. Their mean population size from the years 1993–2003 was an average of 1,500. In 2003 there were an estimated 1,351 penguins and as of 2018 there are around 1,200 mature penguins left. The Galapagos penguin is currently one of the rarest penguin species, next to another penguin species, the yellow-eyed penguin.

The population size on average is about 1,500 individuals per year, depending on the climate events. Population trends were seen to increase and decrease in a span of a year due to La Niña and El Niño events, weather events that affect the conditions on the Galápagos Islands. After a La Niña event, both population size and reproduction were both seen to have an increase in number. El Niño events have been found to reduce Galápagos penguin populations, in some cases nearly as much as 50% decrease was seen in population size. This is due to the warmer climate disrupting the cold water that holds the nutrients that support the marine ecosystem.

== Conservation ==
=== El Niño and climate change ===
The Galápagos penguin is a particularly vulnerable bird species due to its limited range on the Galápagos Islands. With a population of only about 1800, it remains on the endangered species list, and its population will likely fluctuate strongly in response to anthropogenic changes in the region. The primary danger to the Galápagos penguin is the climate phenomena known as El Niño. In 1982–83 and 1997–98, two super El Niño events resulted in Galápagos penguin population declines of 77% and 65%, respectively. Additionally, the years 1965–66, 1968–69, 1972–73, 1976, 1986–87, 1991–92 and 1993 all had relatively weak El Niño events which were associated with slow population recovery. Conversely, during La Niña events when sea surface temperatures are lower than normal and the climate patterns shift, Galápagos penguin populations begin to recover. Anthropogenic climate change has been shown to increase frequency and intensity of El Niño events beyond levels of natural variability which negatively impacts the Galápagos penguin. Warmer temperatures caused by El Niño are associated with poorer female condition and lower adult body weights. Body conditions fluctuate along with the climate events, evidence showing that weight is enhanced during La Nina's cooler temperatures but body weight deteriorates during El Nino when surface level waters are warmed. Under severe conditions, the penguins can even suffer from starvation. This is due to the warmer temperatures of El Niño events resulting in a decrease in upwelling of the cold nutrient rich waters which decreases phytoplankton productivity and results in bottom up trophic disruptions that reduce the food availability for the Galápagos penguin. This lack of food leads to poor breeding success and a disproportionate female death rate, causing population decline and disrupting future recovery by creating uneven sex ratios in the populations. Predictive models suggest future El Niño events will increase in frequency and severity over the next century, posing further threats to the Galápagos penguin. If the pattern of El Niño events from 1965 to 2004 continues, there is a 30% chance of extinction for the Galápagos penguin. If the frequency of strong El Niño events were to double over this same time period, the chance of extinction would be 80%.

=== Disease ===
Another potential threat to the Galápagos penguin is disease. Preliminary studies, such as one conducted in 2001, found no evidence of avian malaria or Marek's disease in Galápagos penguin populations. Despite these findings, the researchers recommended further observations, citing the death of 800 chickens in the Galápagos Islands from Marek's disease, the presence of mosquitos known to carry Avian malaria, and the known impacts of these diseases on other endemic bird populations in Hawaii. Later, a 2009 study revealed the presence of a species of Plasmodium in Galápagos penguins, a genus of blood parasite that causes Avian malaria. The presence of this parasite suggests that diseases are able to travel from other populations to the isolated Galápagos penguin communities and is likely a cause for population decline. Further research suggests that cross-species transmission may occur between endemic Galápagos species and migratory birds such as the Bobolink. Understanding how these diseases reach the Galápagos Islands and transmit between its bird species is a focus for developing conservation strategies for endangered species such as the Galápagos penguin.

=== Other threats ===
Other threats include humans harvesting penguins for oil and other products, competition with fisheries for krill and other fish, habitat loss, increased predation from invasive species, bycatch, and pollution. On Isabela Island, humans may be contributing to the decline of this species due to introduced cats, dogs, and rats which attack penguins, destroy nests, and spread disease. Other threats on land include Sally lightfoot crabs, banded Galapagos snakes, Central Galapagos racers, Galapagos rice rats, Galápagos hawks, and short-eared owls. While in the water, predators include Galapagos sharks, Galapagos fur seals, and Galapagos sea lions. They also face the hazards of unreliable food resources and volcanic activity. Illegal fishing activity may interrupt the penguins' nesting, and they are often caught as bycatch in fishing nets.

These impacts are particularly threatening because of the population structure of the Galápagos penguin. The Galápagos penguin consists of two geographic subpopulations, but studies suggest that there is sufficient gene flow between these populations to treat them together when considering conservation strategies. Additionally, the Galápagos penguin demonstrates relatively low genetic diversity, making it especially vulnerable to disease, predation, and other environmental changes.

As ecological tourism becomes more common on the Galápagos, it is having a more significant impact on native wildlife, including the Galápagos penguins. When incorrectly executed and poorly managed, tourism can contribute to reproductive failure, burrow collapse, or even death to these animals.

Galápagos penguins are protected under the Antarctic Treaty of 1959, which includes all 18 penguin species. Additionally, Galápagos penguins are protected under Ecuadorian jurisdiction; the Galápagos National Park and the Galápagos Marine Reserve are two important entities that are responsible for protecting the Galápagos islands' various species, including the Galápagos penguins. They were able to accomplish this through limiting human activity and interference from outside factors such as fishing and introducing new species to the island.

== Ecology ==
The Galápagos penguin are unique to the Galápagos Islands, predominantly inhabiting Fernandina Island and Isabela Island. These islands offer an environment crucial for these birds' survival and proliferation.

=== Habitat and interaction with the environment ===
The Galápagos penguins have a symbiotic relationship with their habitat. Fernandina and Isabela Islands provide rocky coastlines ideal for nesting, and the surrounding waters, enriched by the Cromwell Current, abound with fish and crustaceans that form their diet. This feeding habit plays a pivotal role in the local marine ecosystem. They help balance the marine food web and contribute to nutrient cycling. The guano produced by these penguins is a rich fertilizer, enhancing the fertility of the coastal soil and indirectly supporting certain plant species native to the islands.

=== Adaptation to island conditions ===
Adapting to the equatorial climate of the Galápagos, these penguins exhibit unique behavioral and physiological traits. Unlike their Antarctic counterparts, they have evolved to withstand warmer temperatures. They pant and seek shade during the hottest parts of the day to regulate body temperature. Physiologically, they have a reduced layer of body fat and smaller size, aiding heat dissipation.

Galápagos penguins breed throughout the year, capitalizing on the fluctuating availability of food resources linked to ocean currents. This flexibility in breeding patterns is a critical adaptation for survival in an environment where food availability is inconsistent.

=== Impact of environmental factors on life expectancy and population ===
Environmental conditions significantly influence the life expectancy and population numbers of Galápagos penguins. Climate events like El Niño significantly affect the marine ecosystem, reducing food availability. During such events, penguin populations face starvation, reduced breeding success, and increased mortality. Furthermore, human-induced factors such as pollution, oil spills, and fishing activities pose additional threats to their survival.

Conservation efforts are crucial for protecting these penguins, which are classified as endangered by the IUCN Red List. Measures include monitoring population trends, habitat preservation, and mitigating human impacts. These efforts are essential to ensure the survival of the Galápagos penguin, a species integral to the biodiversity and ecological balance of the Galápagos Islands.
