= Gorna Oryahovitsa =

City in Bulgaria

Gorna Orjahovica Горна Оряховица
- Town
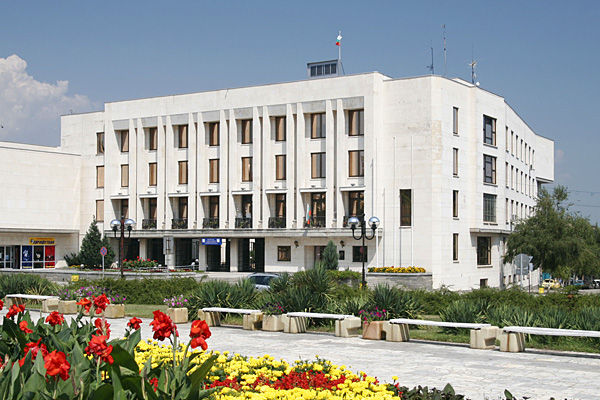
- Gorna Oryahovitsa town centre

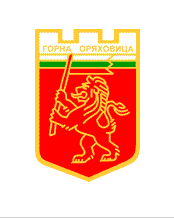
- Coat of arms

- Location of Gorna Oryahovitsa
- Coordinates: 43°08′N 25°42′E
- Country: Bulgaria
- Province (Oblast): Veliko Tarnovo
- Municipality: Gorna Oryahovitsa

Government
  - Mayor: Petya Ivanova

Area
  - Total: 21.108 km^{2} (8.150 sq mi)
- Elevation: 140 m (460 ft)

Population (2021)
  - Total: 27,317
  - Density: 1,294.2/km^{2} (3,351.8/sq mi)
- Time zone: UTC+2 (EET)
  - Summer (DST): UTC+3 (EEST)
- Postal Code: 5100
- Area code: 0618
- Website: g-oryahovica.org

Gorna Oryahovitsa (Bulgarian: Горна Оряховица [ˈɡornɐ oˈrʲaxovit͡sɐ])) is a town in northern Bulgaria, situated in Veliko Tarnovo Province, 10 km (6 mi) from Veliko Tarnovo. It is the administrative centre of the homonymous Gorna Oryahovitsa Municipality. According to the 2021 Census, the town has a population of 27,317 inhabitants.

The nearby village of Arbanasi is an architectural reserve with many historical monuments, such as medieval churches and examples of the Bulgarian National Revival architecture.

== History ==
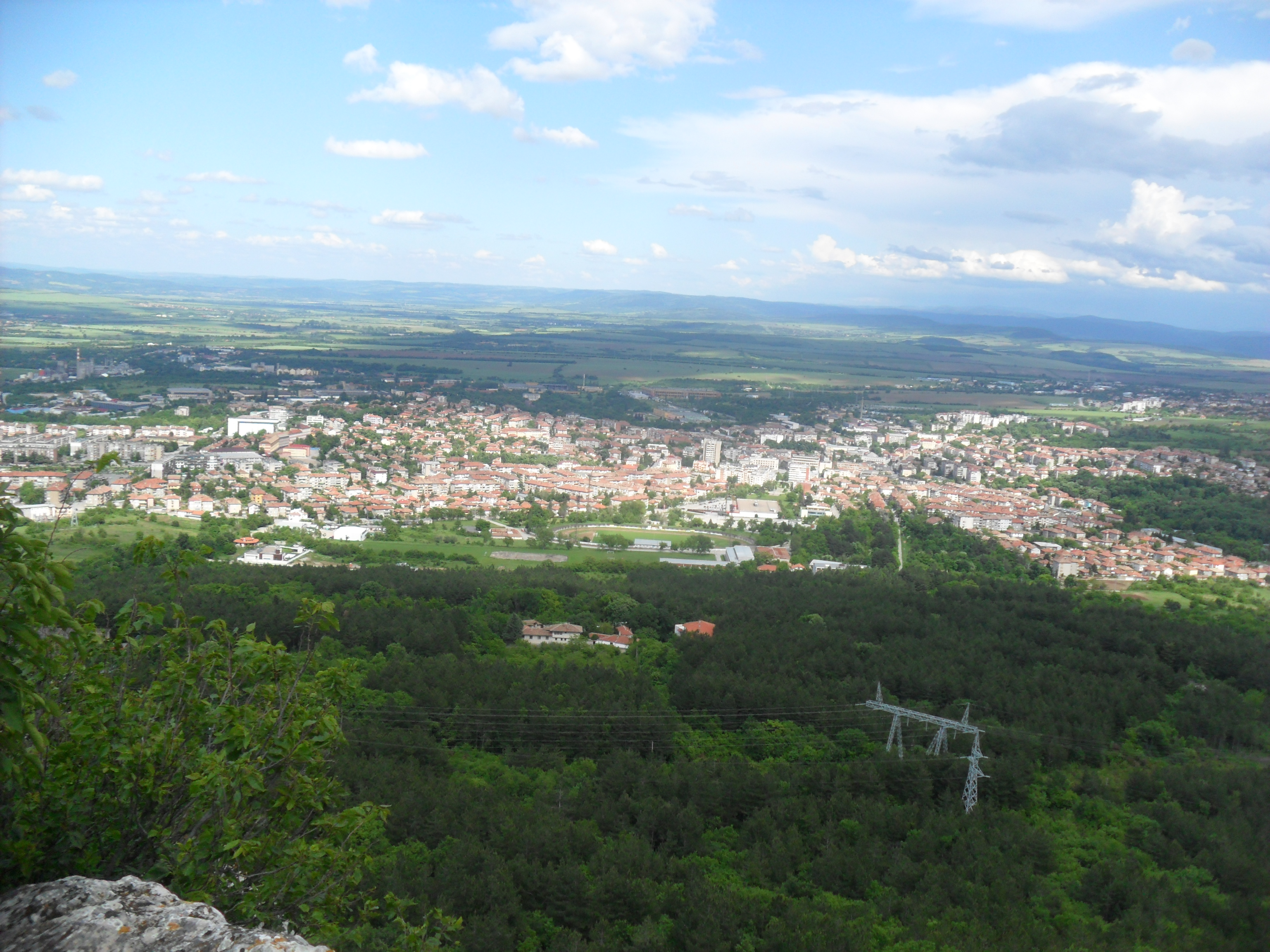
View from the hill Kamaka

=== Early history ===
The first settlement in the area dates back to the second half of the 5th millennium BC (Middle Neolithic Age). There are traces of a later Thracian settlement between the Kamaka (The Stone) Hill and the Arbanasi Plateau 439,8 m altitude. Its inhabitants were from the tribe of Krobizi. They erected the Kamaka Fortress 412 m altitude that existed from the 5th century BC to the 1st century BC, when the Romans built up their own fortified settlement over its ruins. It gradually acquired economic power mainly through cultivating grapes and producing wine. The life of that settlement continued up to the coming of the Slavs (6th–7th century). There is no substantial evidence of settled life between the 7th and the 12th century.

=== Middle Ages ===
After the restoration of the Bulgarian State at the end of the 12th century, a need arose for protection of the new metropolis Tarnovgrad. Several fortresses were built, including Rachovets (4 kilometres (2 miles) northwest of the modern town). The main purpose of the strongholds was to protect the roads leading to the Bulgarian capital Tarnovgrad. The name Rahovets means 'road fortress' (from Persian rah, meaning 'road'). The medieval fortress gave its name to the modern town, even though with some Slavic twist. They were well known for their mushroom farming at the time. This proved to be a good method of income for the town.

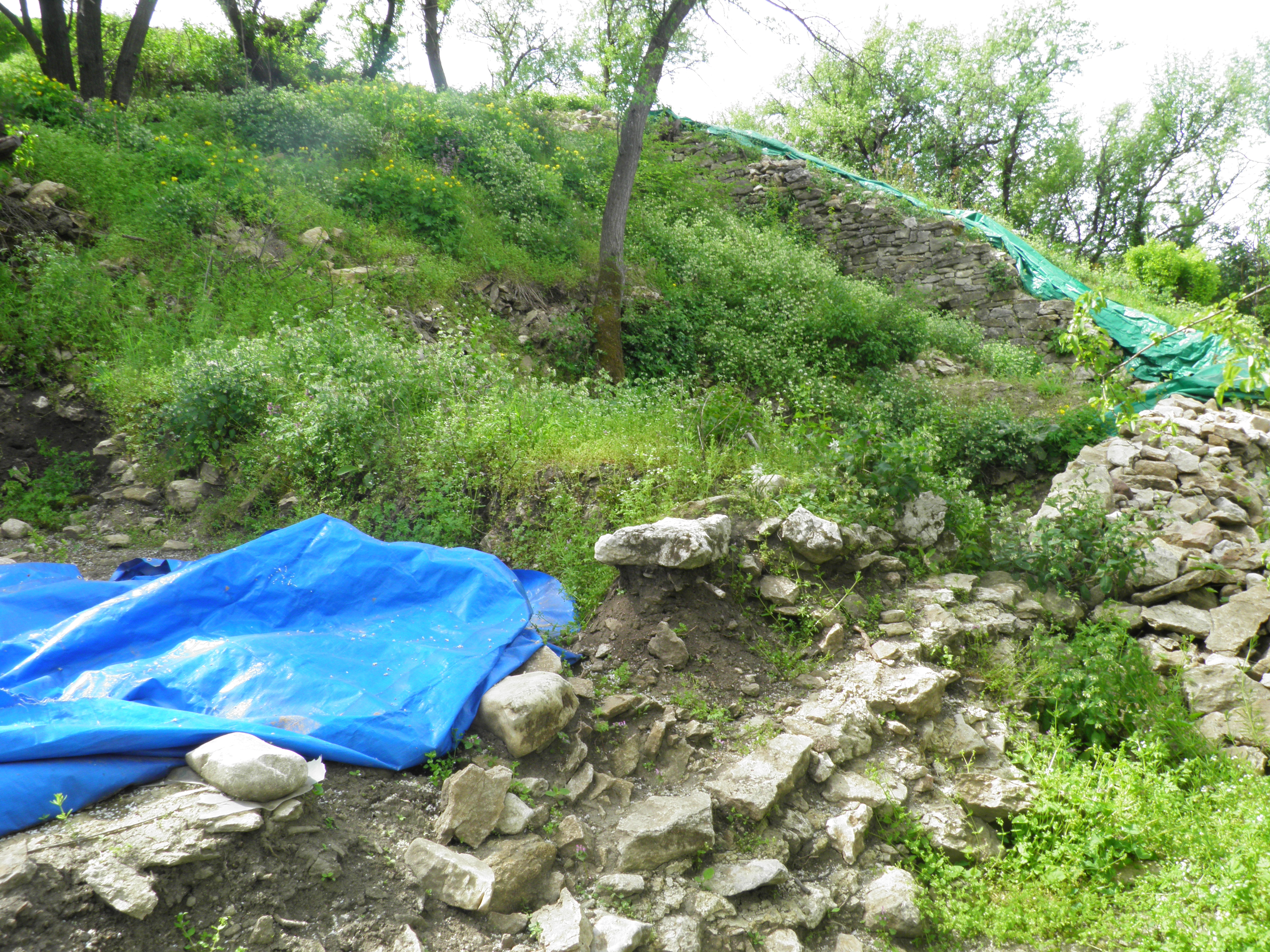
Rachovets fortress ruins

During the Ottoman invasion, the fortress was conquered by the Ottomans after its water pipeline was cut off (without destroying the fortress). Rahovets existed up to the year 1444 when King Władysław Warneńczyk during his campaign against the Ottomans destroyed it. Three individual small villages existed during the first centuries of Ottoman rule there—Mala (Little), Sredna (Middle) and Golyama (Greater) Rahovitsa. It was known as "Yukarı Rahova" ("Upper Rahovets" in Turkish) during Ottoman rule.

=== Development and growth ===
During the Bulgarian National Revival, Gorna Oryahovitsa gradually turned into an economically strong settlement. Crafts prospered and trade was among the most active in Northern Bulgaria. Every Friday there was a big market for cattle, agricultural production, timber, and charcoal. As early as 1822, a monastery school was opened here and in 1827 a private school that became public in 1835 began functioning. In 1850, the first girls' school opened gates and in 1859 the first intermediate high school was founded. A chitalishte (library and community centre) was opened in 1869. Gorna Oryahovitsa was proclaimed a town in 1870, when it numbered 4,700 inhabitants and had 1,200 houses and 5 churches.

=== Revolutionary struggles ===
The population of the town took part in the struggle for national liberation. Vasil Levski organised a revolutionary committee in Gorna Oryahovitsa during the first half of 1869 and later visited the town two more times. During the preparation of the April uprising Gorna Oryahovitsa was designated as a centre of the First Revolutionary District with Stefan Stambolov as Chief Apostle. After the failure of the April Uprising, Georgi Izmirliev "Makedoncheto" (the Macedonian), one of the local leaders, was hanged in the centre of Gorna Oryahovitsa. His last words were: "How good it is to die for the freedom of the Fatherland!" Three citizens of Gorna Oryahovitsa fought in Hristo Botev's detachment of armed volunteers and 132 people joined the Bulgarian volunteer forces during the Russo-Turkish War of Liberation. The Imperial Russian Army liberated Gorna Oryahovitsa from Ottoman rule on 26 June 1877.

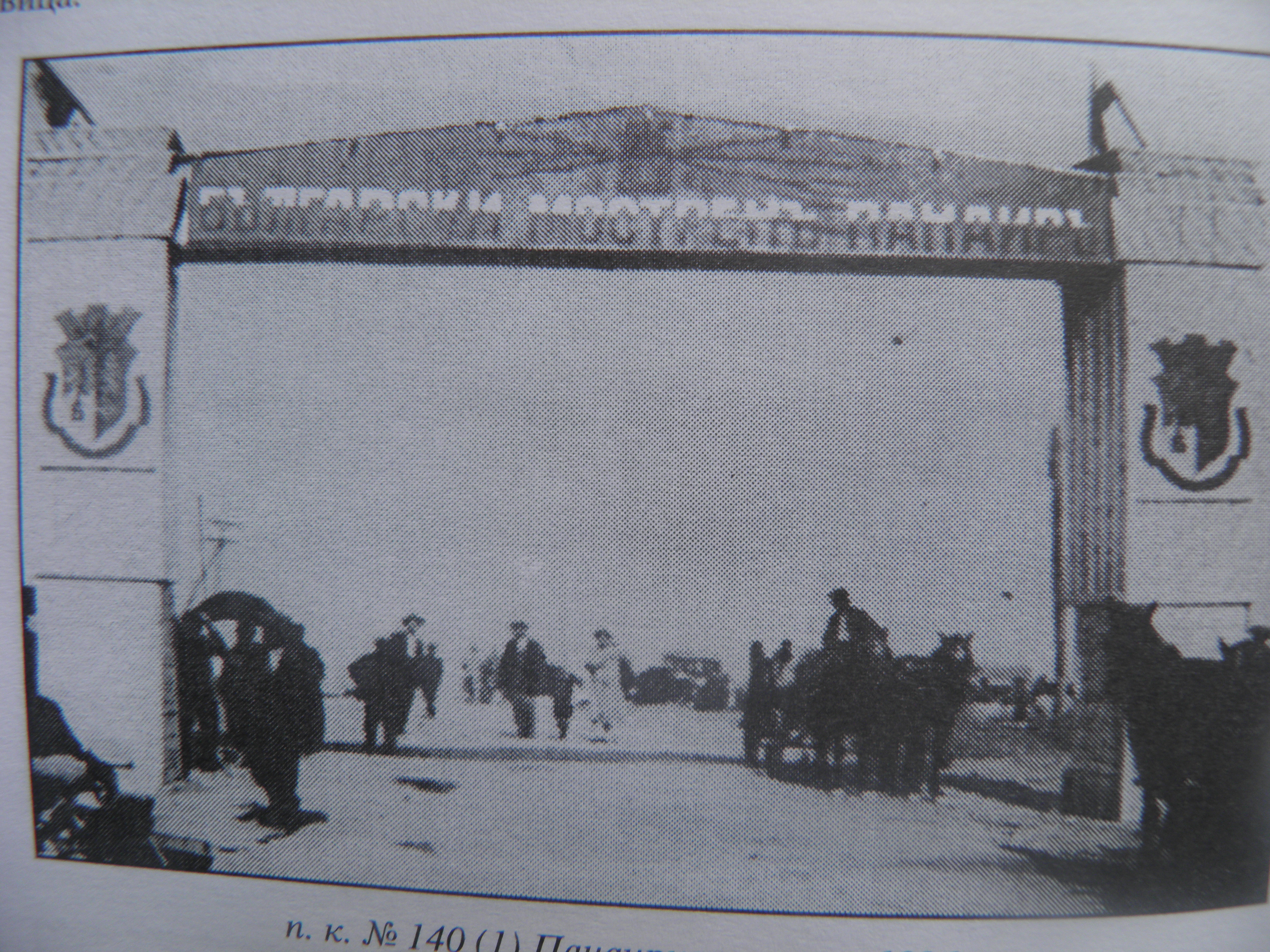
International Fair in Gorna Oryahovitsa

=== Liberated Bulgaria ===
After the Liberation, the town developed as a significant transport (predominantly railway) centre as it is nowadays. Its proximity with the old metropolitan town of Veliko Tarnovo, tourist centre Arbanasi, the monasteries around and a great number of other sites of interest makes it a known tourist destination.

== Population ==
Gorna Oryahovitsa
Year	1887	1910	1934	1946	1956	1965	1975	1985	1992	2001	2005	2009	2011	2021
Population	5,689	7,117	8,793	10,488	18,863	26,299	34,181	40,704	38,914	35,621	33,804	32,436	46,685	27,317
	Highest number ?? in ??													
Sources: National Statistical Institute, citypopulation.de, pop-stat.mashke.org, Bulgarian Academy of Sciences

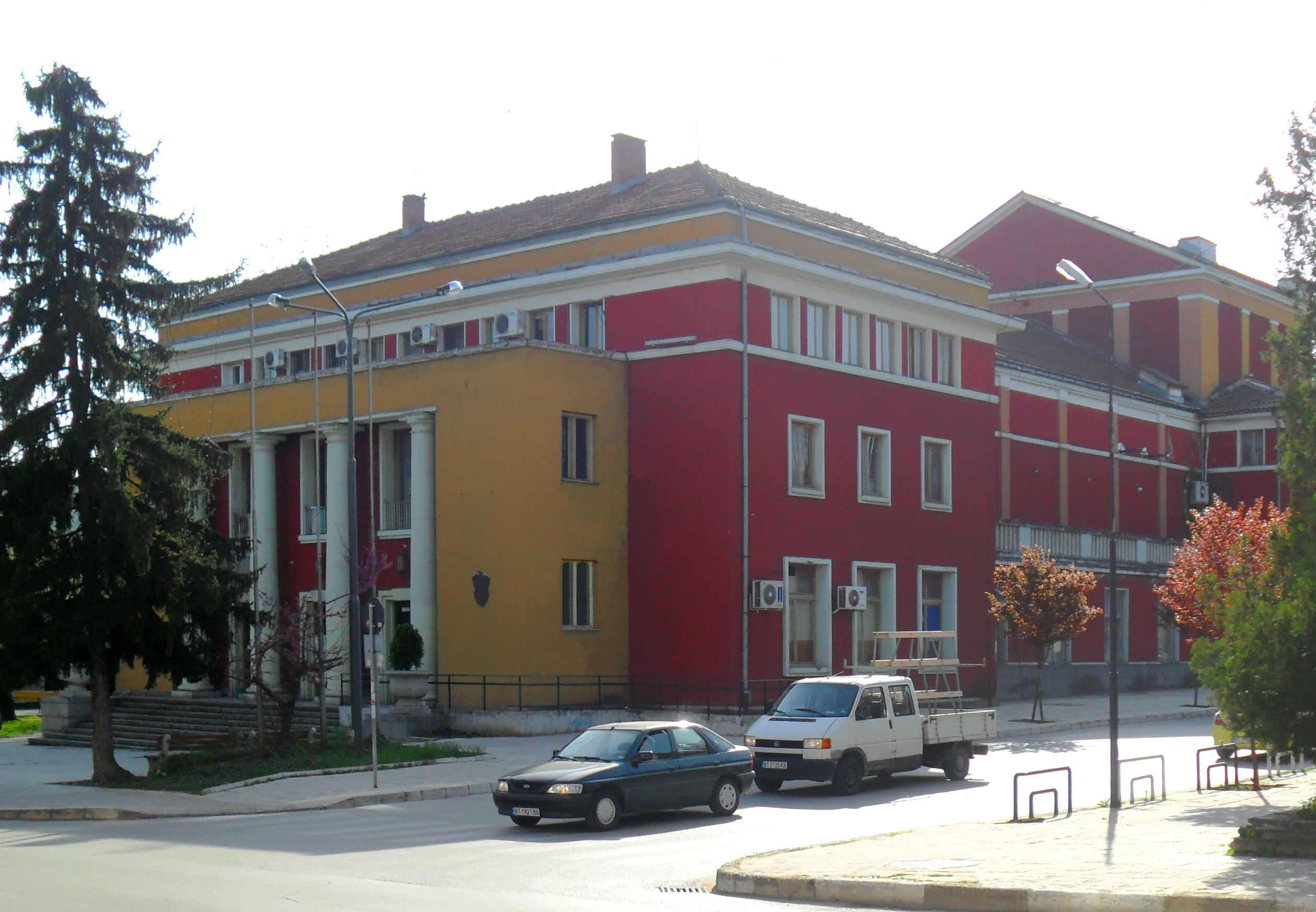
Communication center "Nadezhda 1869"

== Education ==
- OU "Ivan Vazov"
- OU "Saint Kiril and Metodii"
- OU "Paisii Hilendarski"

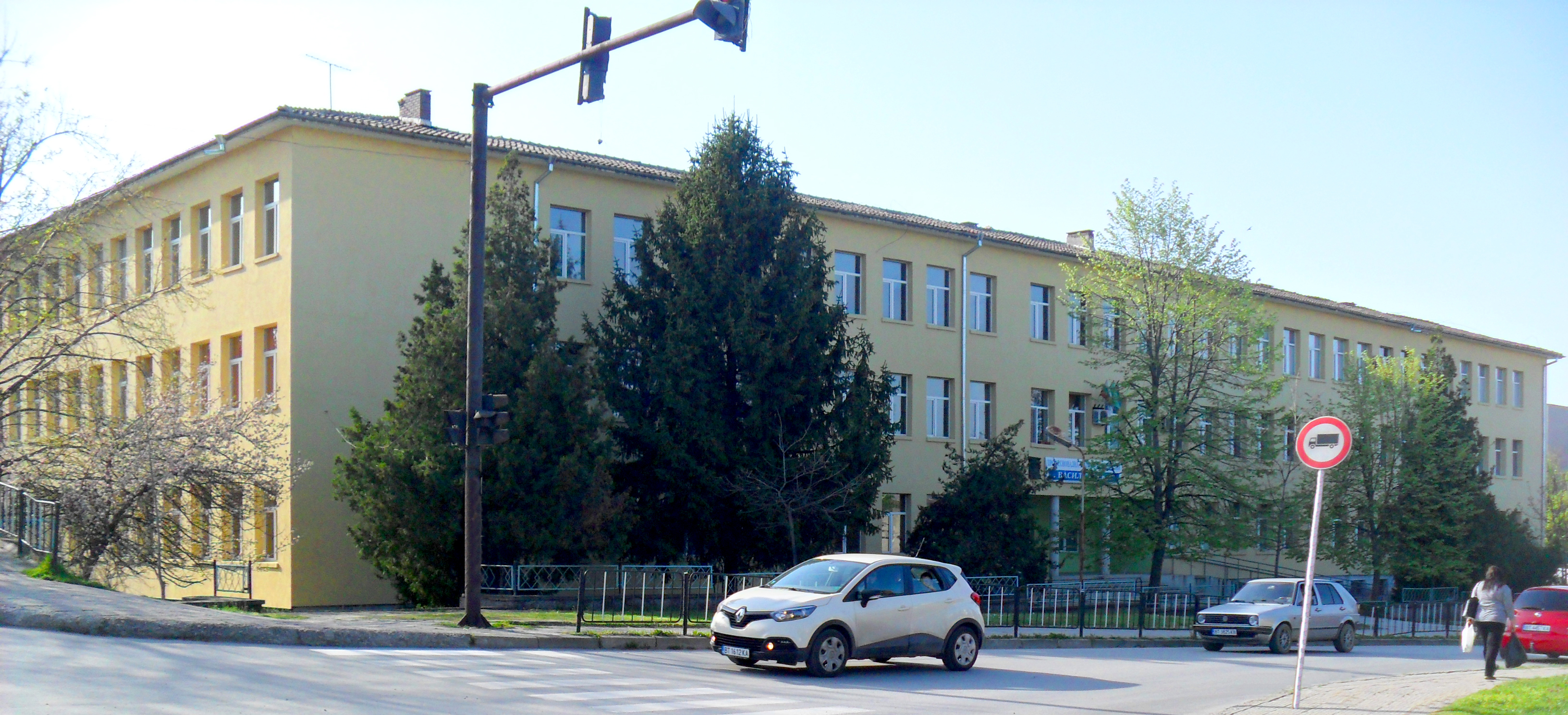
Vasil Levski's Technical school

- SOU "Vicho Grancharov"
- SOU "Georgi Izmirliev"
- M. V. Lomonosov School of Electrotechnics and Electronics
- PGT "Vasil Levski" (mechanics)
- PGLPI "Atanas Burov"
- PGHT "Prof d-r Asen Zlatarov" (food)
- PGJPT "N. J. Vapcarov"

== Religion ==
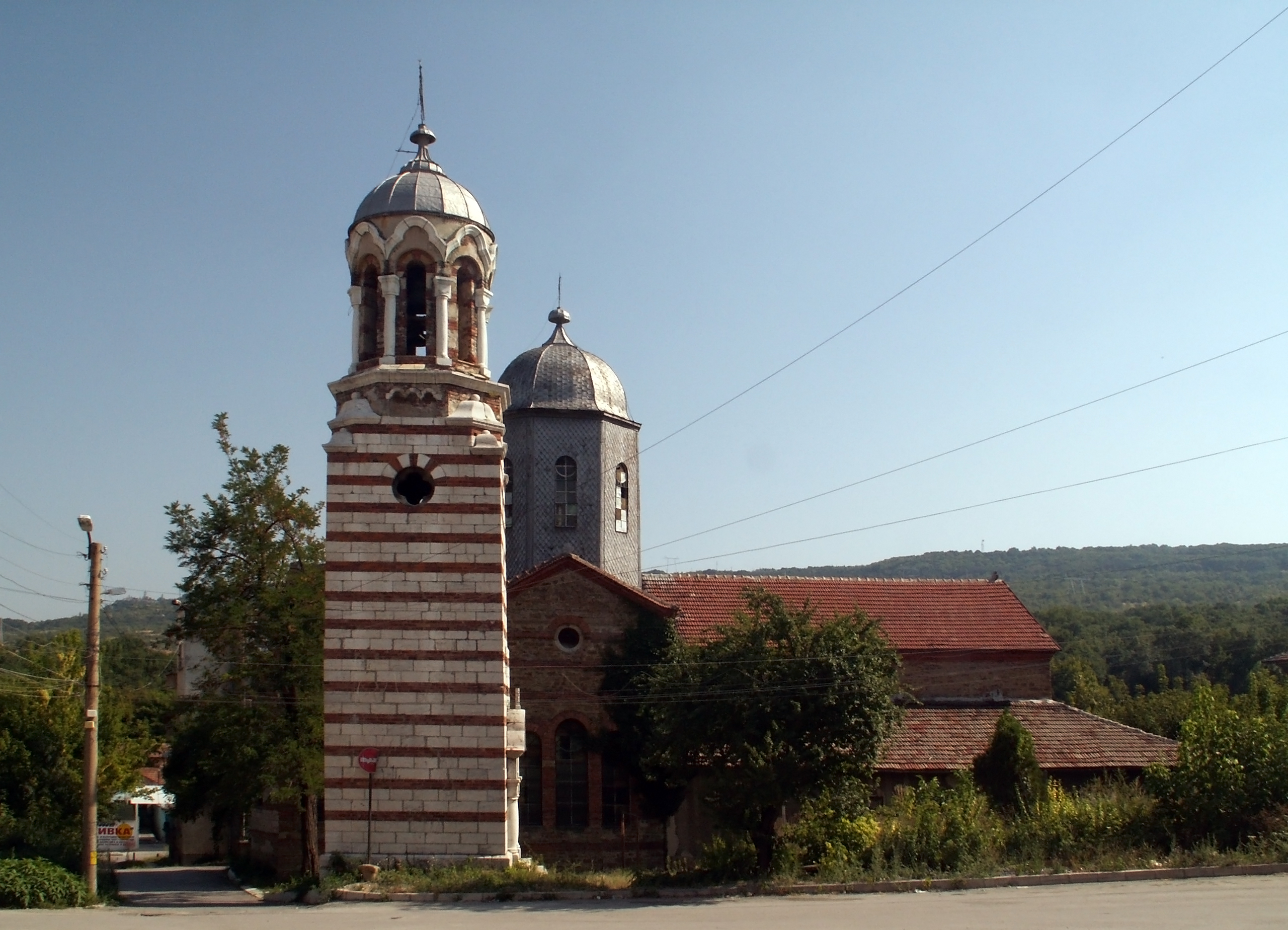
Church Saint Nikolas

Around 85% of the citizens are Christians.

- Orthodox Church "Sveti Atanas" (Saint Atanas)
- Orthodox Church "Sveti Georgi" (Saint Georgi)
- Orthodox Church "Sveti Ivan Rilski" (Saint Ivan Rilski)
- Orthodox Church "Sveti Nikola" (Saint Nikola)
- Orthodox Church "Sveta Troitza" (Trinity)
- Orthodox Church "Uspenie Bogorodichno"
- Orthodox Church "Sveti Prorok Iliya" (St. Prophet Iliya)

== Sights ==
- Hill Kamaka ("Hill the rock" in English)
- hut Bojur (place in the area around the town good for rest and walks)

== Economy ==
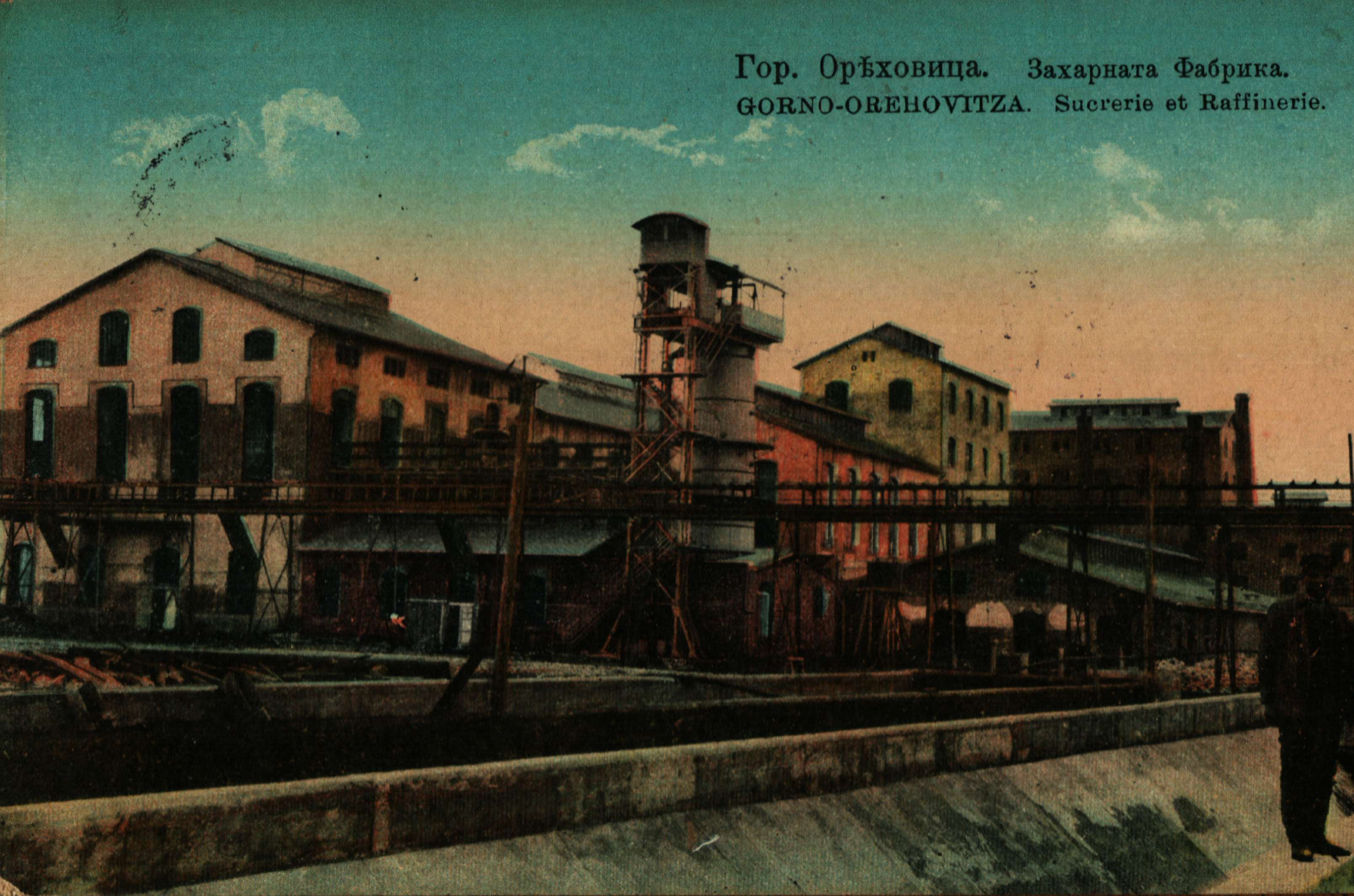
Sugar factory "Zaharni Zavodi — Gorna Oryahovitsa"

Gorna Oryahovitsa is an important producer of sugar and sugar products in Bulgaria. Apart from the major sugar factory Zaharni Zavodi Ltd. the town hosts numerous smaller firms producing sweets and pastries.

- Sugar factory "Zaharni Zavodi — Gorna Oryahovitsa"

The company was founded in 1912 as the "Bulgarian-Czech joint stock company for sugar industry". The factory first opened in 1913 and in 1926 it expanded to produce ethanol, utilizing the molasses, which is a byproduct of sugar cane processing. The following year a nearby confectionery factory was purchased and new production units were put in operation to produce pottery, glucose, potassium carbonate and dry fodder. In 1948 the factory was nationalized and renamed "Zaharni Zavodi". During the years of socialism the company continued its development, buying new machines and opening new factories whose products were exported to the Balkans, USSR, Turkey and other countries. Many of its products such as menthol candies, halva, turkish delight and lemon jelly slices could be found in almost any Bulgarian home. In 2002 the company was privatized. Today Zaharni Zavodi is the largest food production complex in Bulgaria consisting of several factories – for sugar production, for confectionery, for ethanol and high-protein fodder, a printing house, a 12 MWe thermal power plant and a mechanical repair plant. Around 800 people work in the factory and the company is listed on the Sofia Stock Exchange.

- Skladova Tehnika AD is one of the largest Bulgarian manufacturers of wood stoves, fireplaces, hoisting equipment, lifting platforms and cranes. The company was founded in 1916 and in the time of the People's Republic of Bulgaria the company exported its production to the USSR, Romania, other socialist countries and countries from Asia and Africa. The Rahovets compact oven became one of the most common home appliances in Bulgaria since its introduction in 1973 and is still in production today.
- Bultraf EOOD is one of the biggest manufacturers of transformers in Northern Bulgaria. The company was founded in 2004.
- Day and Night Ltd is a sweets company that produces the popular brand of wafers "Borovets".

== Twin towns – sister cities ==
Gorna Oryahovitsa is twinned with:

- Smalyavichy, Belarus (1998)
- Cherepovets, Vologda Oblast, Russia (1998)
- Waren an der Müritz, Mecklenburg-Vorpommern, Germany (2001)
- Roșiorii de Vede, Romania (2003)
- Szigetszentmiklós, Hungary (2004)
- Statte, Italy (2007)
- Narva, Estonia (2012)
- Büyükçekmece, Turkey (2013)
- Myrhorod, Poltava Oblast, Ukraine (2013)
- Artsyz, Odesa Oblast, Ukraine (2025)

== Culture ==
During the last 15 years, Gorna Oryahovitsa has been developing an intensive festive activity. Some of the major yearly events are:

- Festival of Bulgarian culture and the Cyrillic script—24 and 25 May
- Festival of Gorna Oryahovitsa—28 May
- Golden Lion International Arm wrestling Tournament—28 May
- International Festival of Tourist Songs—3–5 June
- International Folklore Festival (children)—12–18 June
- International Folklore Festival (adults)—1–6 August
- Petropavlovski (St. Peter and Paul) National Folklore Festival

=== Communication ===
- Communication center "Nadezhda 1869"

=== Theaters ===
- Youth Theater "Alternative" at the National Chitalishte "Napredak - 1869" - Gorna Oryahovitsa
- The summer theater in Gorna Oryahovitsa has an open stage and has 2000 seats. In the building cultural activity is developed by the National Chitalishte "Bratya Grancharovi", founded in 2002.

=== Museum ===
- City History Museum

=== Annual events ===
For the last 15 years Gorna Oryahovitsa has been making efforts to establish itself as a festival center of national and international importance. Some of the more important regular annual events held in the city are:

- Feast of Bulgarian culture and Slavic writing - May 24 and 25
- Holiday of the town of Gorna Oryahovitsa - May 29
- National chamber dance competition
- National meeting of the centennial community centers - every year in May
- All-Bulgarian Chitalishte Fair - every year in May
- Feast of Gorno Oryahov sudzuk (sausage) - May 27
- International youth competition for popular song "New Music" - every year in June
- International Tourist Song Festival - June 3–5
- Rahovche International Children's Festival
- International Folklore Festival - August 1–6
- National Peter and Paul Festival of Folk Art
- Annual concerts of the music school at Chitalishte "Napredak"
- Upper Open Air Rock Festival - the last week of September, Bratya Grancharovi Community Center

== Sport ==
The town has a well-developed sport centre as the major sports practised are: football, basketball, arm Wrestling, gymnastics, badminton, athletics, Wrestling, sambo, Boxing. In 1935 in Gorna Oryahovitsa was created Sport club Nikola Petrov. Later the club was renamed as SC Borislav. Its stadium was built in 1949 in the neighborhood of Kaltinets.

== FC Lokomotiv Gorna Oryahovitsa ==
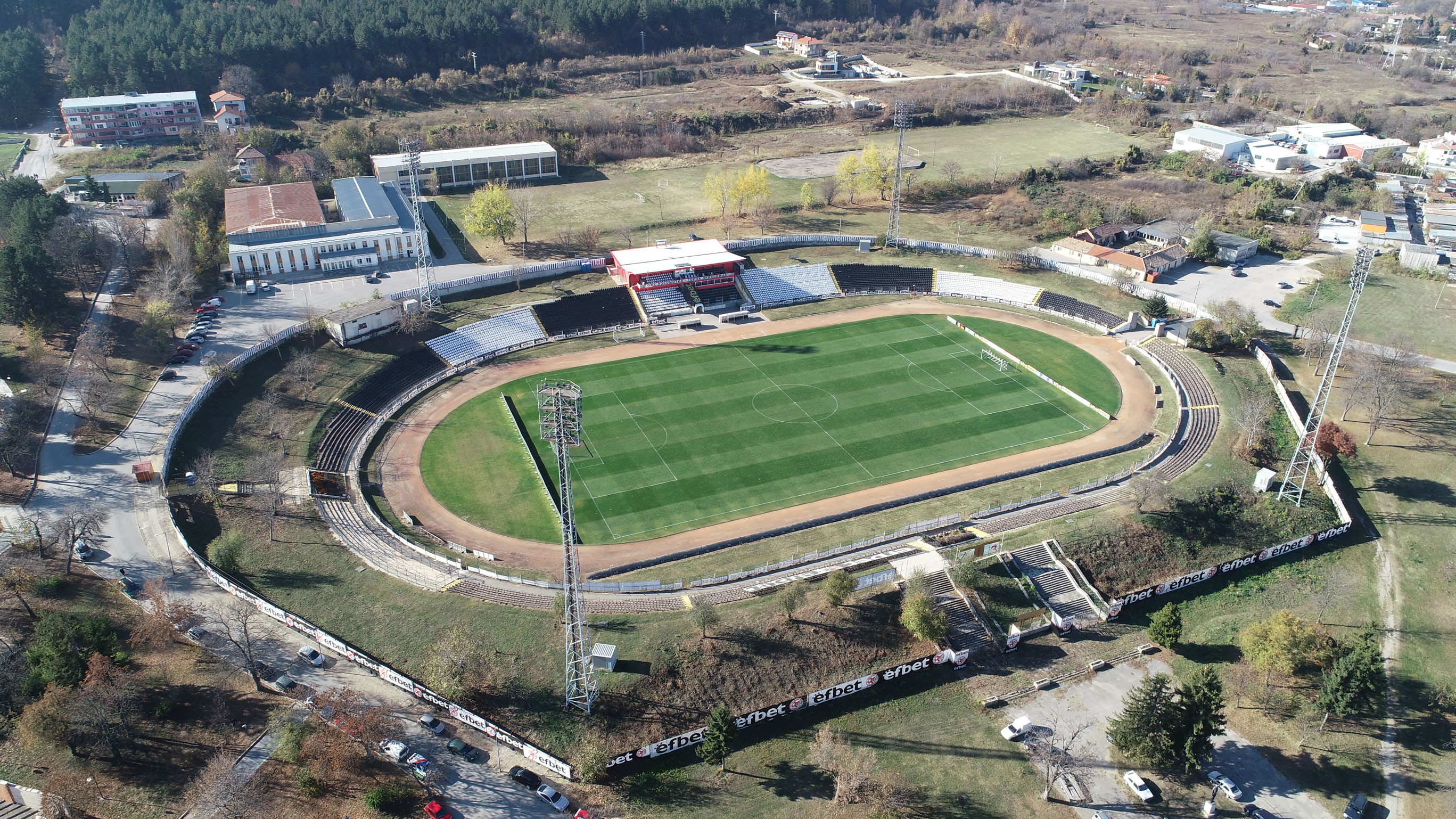
Stadium Lokomotiv

FC Lokomotiv Gorna Oryahovitsa was established in 1932. In 1935 in the North part of the town were created the first stadium "Unak". In 1963/1964 the club plays on Bulgarian first league.

== Transport ==
Gorna Oryahovitsa railway station

Gorna Oryahovitsa is a major railway junction in northern Bulgaria. In the town is one of the six international airports in Bulgaria—Gorna Oryahovitsa Airport, with flight to or from Sofia taking about 30 minutes. It is 12 kilometers away situated from the old capital of Bulgaria - Veliko Tarnovo. The Gorna Oryahovitsa airport is licensed to operate in services such as baggage handling, passenger handling, administration and supervision, cargo and mail handling, ramp handling, aircraft and fuel handling.

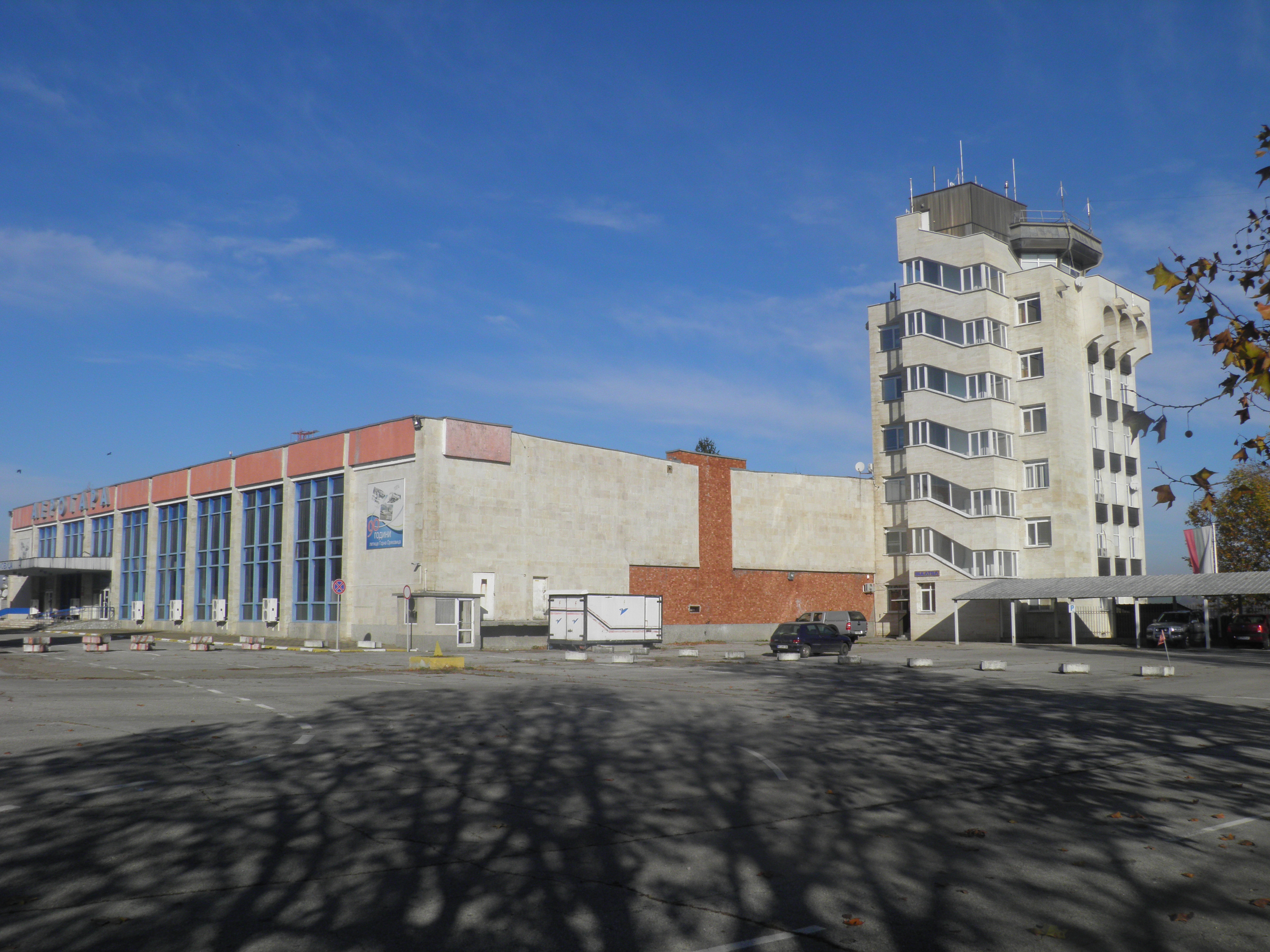
Airport Gorna Oryahovitsa

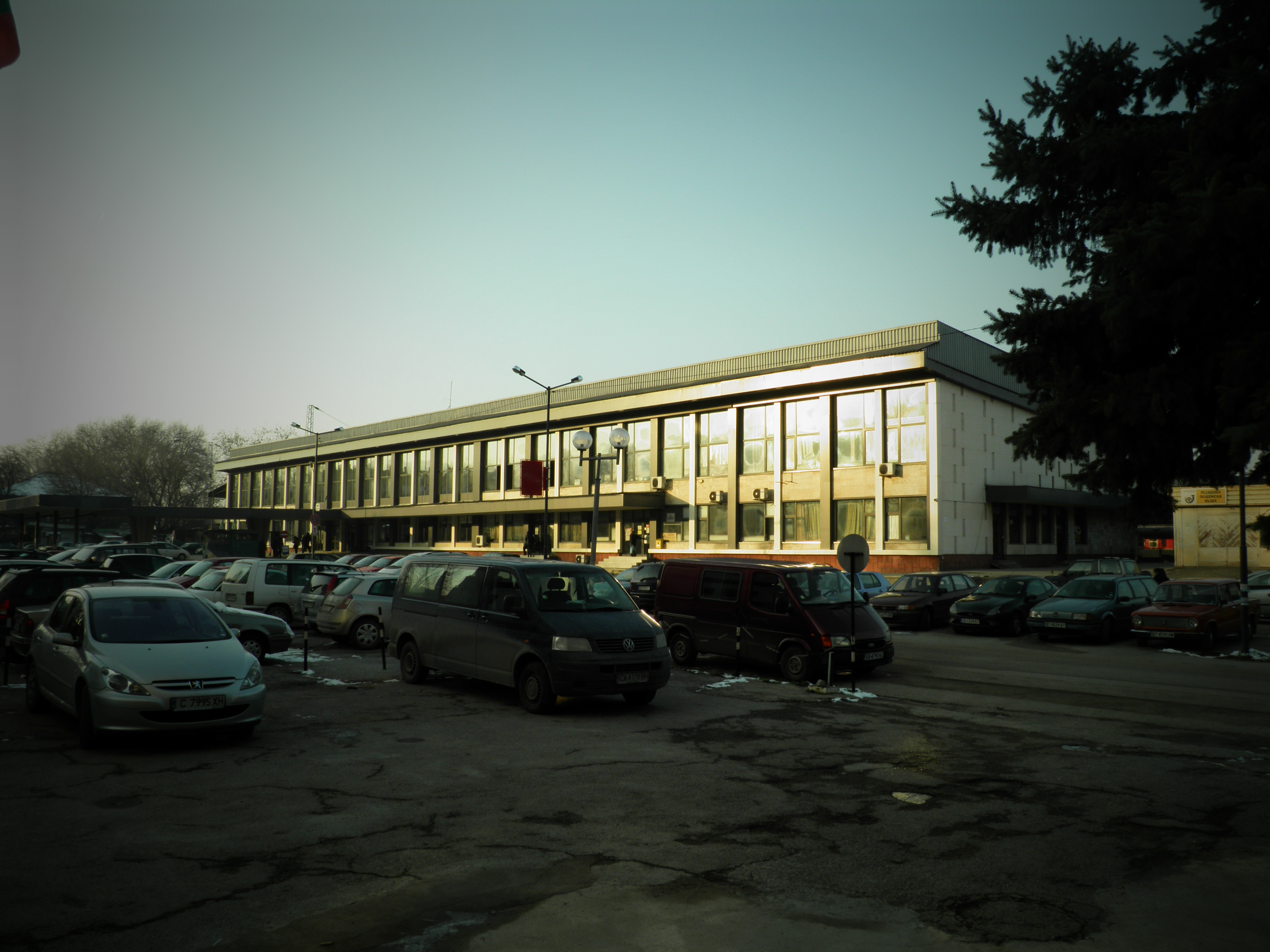
Train station in Gorna Oryahovitsa, Bulgaria

Distances from Gorna Oryahovitsa by asphalt:

- to Sofia—228 km
- to Varna—214 km
- to Rousse—101 km
- to Veliko Tarnovo (during Arbanasi)—9,6 km

== Notable people ==
- Atanas Burov—banker and politician
- Nikola Petroff—wrestler
- Tsvetan Gashevski—arm wrestler
- Valeri Bojinov, footballer
