= Subsurface ocean current =

Oceanic currents that flow beneath surface currents

A subsurface ocean current is an oceanic current that runs beneath surface currents. Examples include the Equatorial Undercurrents of the Pacific, Atlantic, and Indian Oceans, the California Undercurrent, and the Agulhas Undercurrent, the deep thermohaline circulation in the Atlantic, and bottom gravity currents near Antarctica. The forcing mechanisms vary for these different types of subsurface currents.

== Density current ==
The most common of these is the density current, epitomized by the Thermohaline current. The density current works on a basic principle: the denser water sinks to the bottom, separating from the less dense water, and causing an opposite reaction from it. There are numerous factors controlling density.

=== Salinity ===
One is the salinity of water, a prime example of this being the Mediterranean/Atlantic exchange. The saltier waters of the Mediterranean sink to the bottom and flow along there, until they reach the ledge between the two bodies of water. At this point, they rush over the ledge into the Atlantic, pushing the less saline surface water into the Mediterranean.

=== Temperature ===
Another factor of density is temperature. Thermohaline (literally meaning heat-salty) currents are very influenced by heat. Cold water from glaciers, icebergs, etc. descends to join the ultra-deep, cold section of the worldwide Thermohaline current. After spending an exceptionally long time in the depths, it eventually heats up, rising to join the higher Thermohaline current section. Because of the temperature and expansiveness of the Thermohaline current, it is substantially slower, taking nearly 1000 years to run its worldwide circuit.

== Turbidity current ==
One factor of density is so unique that it warrants its own current type. This is the turbidity current. Turbidity current is caused when the density of water is increased by sediment. This current is the underwater equivalent of a landslide. When sediment increases the density of the water, it falls to the bottom, and then follows the form of the land. In doing so, the sediment inside the current gathers more from the ocean bed, which in turn gathers more, and so on. As a limited amount of sediment can be carried by a certain amount of water, more water must become laden with sediment, until a huge, destructive current is washing down some marine hillside. It is theorized that submarine depths, such as the Marianas Trench have been caused in part by this action. There is one additional effect of turbidity currents: upwelling. All of the water rushing into ocean valleys displaces a significant amount of water. This water literally has nowhere to go but up. The upwelling current goes almost straight up. This spreads the nutrient rich ocean life to the surface, feeding some of the world’s largest fisheries. This current also helps Thermohaline currents return to the surface.

== Ekman Spiral ==
An entirely different class of subsurface current is caused by friction with surface currents and objects. When the wind or some other surface force compels surface currents into motion, some of this is translated into subsurface motion. The Ekman Spiral, named after Vagn Walfrid Ekman, is the standard for this transfer of energy. The Ekman Spiral works as follows: when the surface moves, the subsurface inherits some -but not all- of this motion. Due to the Coriolis Effect, however, the current moves at a 45˚ angle to the right of the first (left in the Southern Hemisphere). The current below is slower yet, and moves at a 45˚ angle to the right. This process continues in the same manner, until, at about 100 meters below the surface, the current is moving in the opposite direction of the surface current.

== Subsidence ==
The final type of subsurface current is subsidence, caused when forces push water against some obstacle (like a rock), causing it to pile up there. The water at the bottom of the pileup flows away from it, causing a subsidence current.

== Wave Patterns ==
Various subsurface currents conflict at times, causing bizarre wave patterns. One of the most noticeable of these is the Maelstrom. The word is derived from Nordic words meaning to grind and stream. Essentially, the maelstrom is a large, very powerful whirlpool, a large swirling body of water being drawn down and inward toward its center. This is usually the result of tidal currents.

== Effect ==
Subsurface currents have a large effect on life on earth. They flow beneath the surface of the water, allowing them to be relatively free of external influence. Thus, they function like clockwork, providing nutrient transportation, water transfer, etc., as well as affecting the ocean floor and submarine processes.

== See also ==
- Oceanography
