= Cromwell Current =

Eastward-flowing subsurface current in the Pacific Ocean

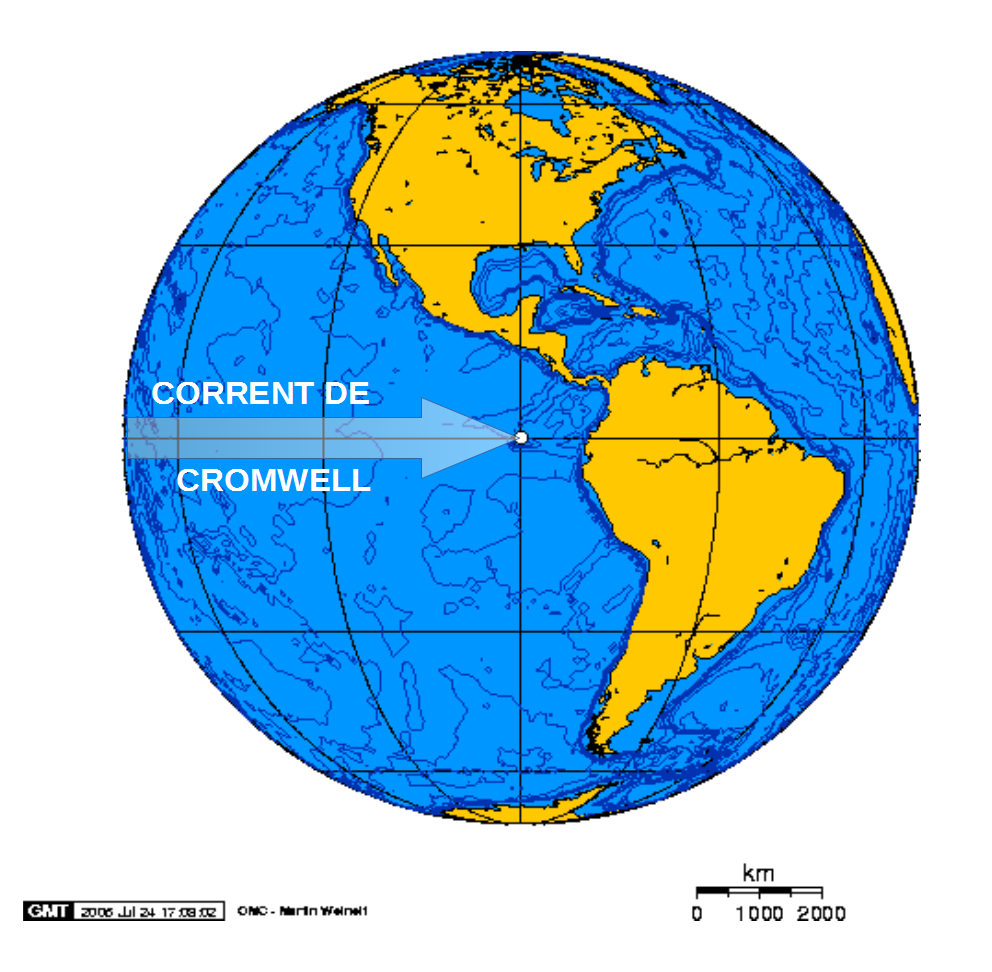

The Cromwell Current (also called Pacific Equatorial Undercurrent or just Equatorial Undercurrent) is an eastward-flowing subsurface current that extends the length of the equator in the Pacific Ocean.

The Cromwell Current was discovered in 1952 by Townsend Cromwell, a researcher with the Honolulu Laboratory of the Fish and Wildlife Service (later the United States Fish and Wildlife Service). It is 250 miles (220 nmi; 400 km) wide and flows to the east. It is hidden 300 feet (91 m) under the surface of the Pacific Ocean at the equator and is relatively shallow compared to other ocean currents being only 100 feet (30 m) from top to base. It is a powerful current with top velocities of up to 1.5 m/s (2.9 knots; 3.4 mph). The current's core coincides with the thermocline and its distance from the parallel Equatorial Counter Current is approximately 300 kilometres (190 mi; 160 nmi). It has 1,000 times the volume of the Mississippi River and its length is 3,500 miles (3,000 nmi; 5,600 km).

== Discovery ==
In 1951 researchers on board a Fish and Fish and Wildlife Service fisheries research vessel were engaged in exploratory longline fishing when they noticed that the gear deep under water drifted eastwards. This was considered unusual because the surface currents of the Pacific Ocean flow westwards at the equator, following the direction of the winds. In 1952 Townsend Cromwell led a research party to investigate how the currents of the ocean varied as a function of depth. They discovered a fast-flowing current that flowed eastwards in the deep surface layers.

== Mechanism ==
It is difficult to explain the Cromwell Current easily. At least two different mechanisms are at work in order to guarantee the constant eastward current: (a) Because the Cromwell Current is located on the equator, the Coriolis force is equal to zero and does not act upon a water parcel. This means that the east–west pressure gradient functions without being diverted from the high-pressure area in the west toward the low-pressure area in the east, simply following the gradient. The cause of the pressure gradient is at least partially the trade winds blowing from the east westward. (b) Any water parcel flowing eastward from the west that would somehow be perturbed from its path would be diverted northward if north of the equator and southward if south of the equator. In such a case the local Coriolis force would force the parcel immediately back into the main current that flows from west to east.

== Detailed data ==
- Depth: The surface currents flow west. There is reversal point about 40 metres (130 ft) down, where the water starts to flow east. The current goes down to about 400 metres (1,300 ft).
- Flow rate: The total flow is up to around 30,000,000 cubic metres (1.1×10^{9} cu ft) per second. The top speed is around 1.5 m/s (2.9 knots; 3.4 mph), which is about twice as fast as the westerly surface current.
- Length: 13,000 kilometres (7,000 nmi; 8,100 mi)

== Interaction with El Niño ==
El Niño is a reversal of the normal situation in the Pacific Ocean. Surface water is blown westwards by the prevailing winds and deeper water is forced upwards to replace it. Every now and then, the surface water sloshes back across the ocean, bringing warm water temperatures along the eastern coasts of the Pacific. In non-El Niño years, the Cromwell Current is forced to the surface by underwater seamounts near the Galapagos islands (this is called upwelling.) However, during El Nino years the current does not upwell in this way. The waters around the islands are therefore considerably warmer during El Niño years than during normal years.

== Effect on wildlife ==
The Cromwell Current is both oxygen- and nutrient-rich. A large number of fish are concentrated in it. Upwelling occurs near the Galapagos Islands. This brings food supplies to the surface for Galápagos penguin. Upwelling, however, is a sporadic phenomenon; it fails to occur on a regular basis, and so the food supply comes and goes. The penguins have several adaptations to cope with this, including versatility in their breeding habits.

== Possible effect on climate ==
The effect of this current on world climate is not well understood.

== See also ==
- Lomonosov Current – Deep current in the Atlantic Ocean. from the coast of Brazil to the Gulf of Guinea
- Ocean current – Directional mass flow of oceanic water
- Ocean gyre – Any large system of circulating ocean surface currents
- Physical oceanography – Study of physical conditions and processes within the ocean
