= Rachovets (fortress) =

Ancient Thracian and Ottoman fortress in Bulgaria

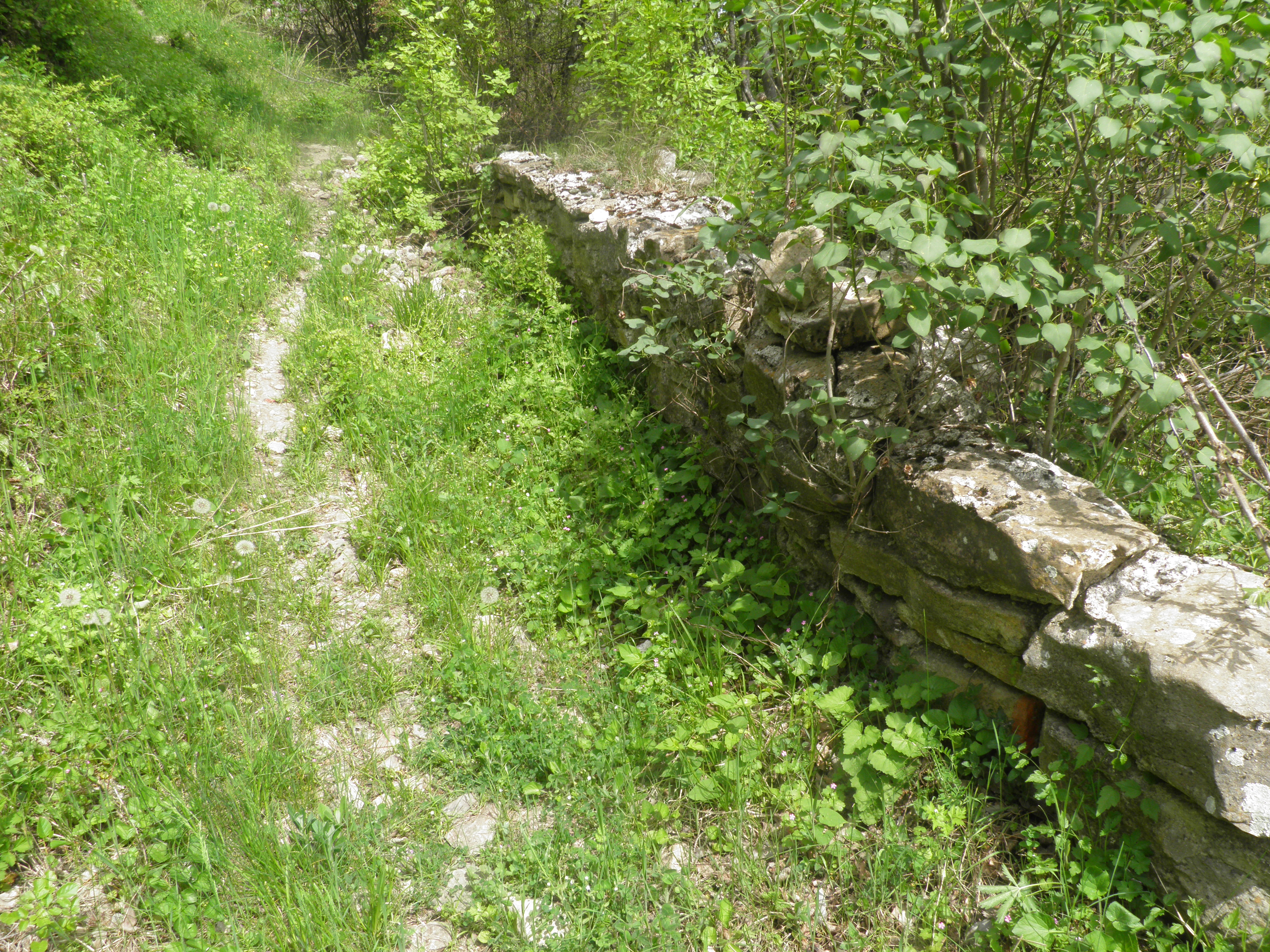
North ruins Rahovets fortress

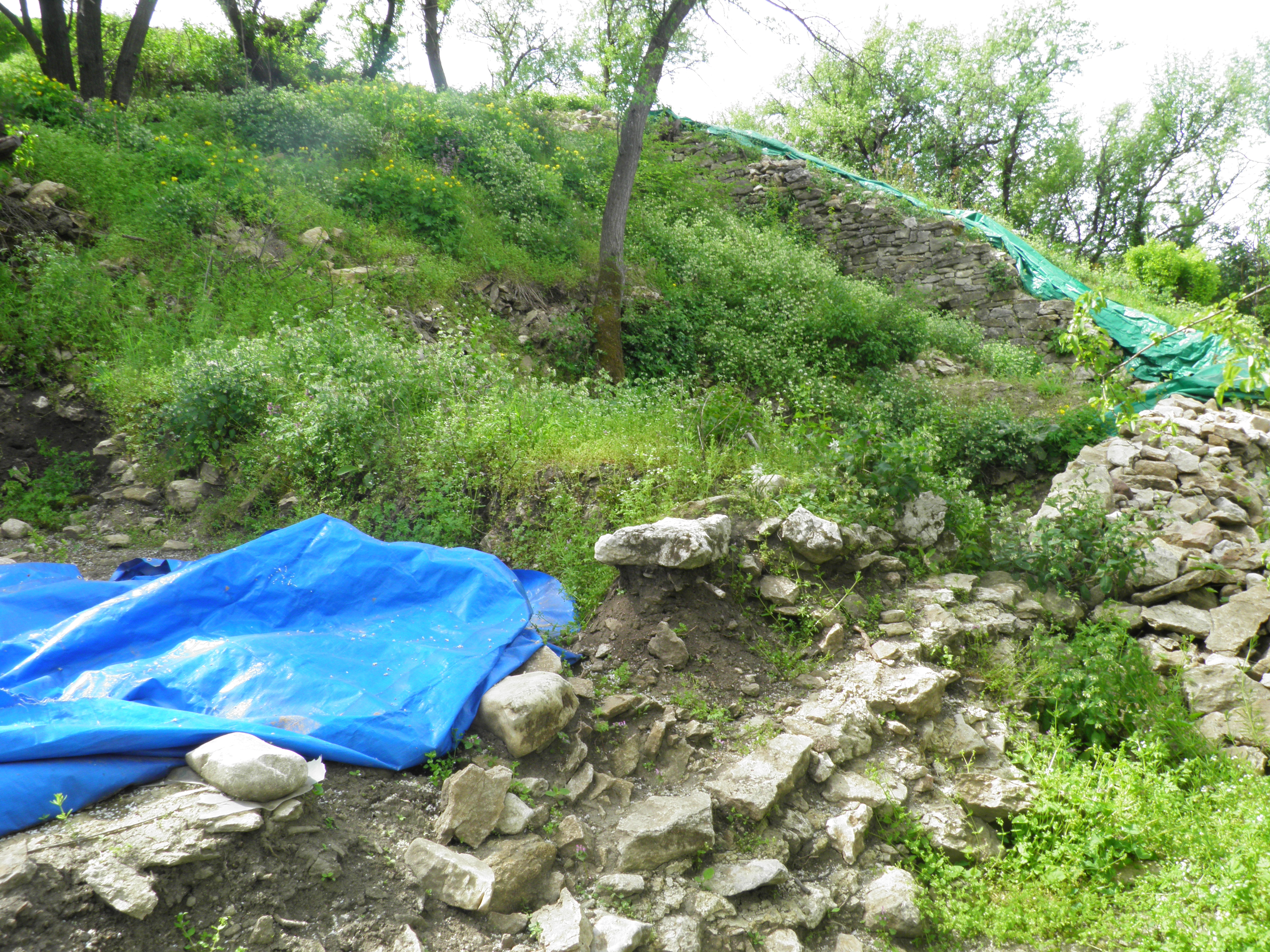
Rahovets fortress ruins

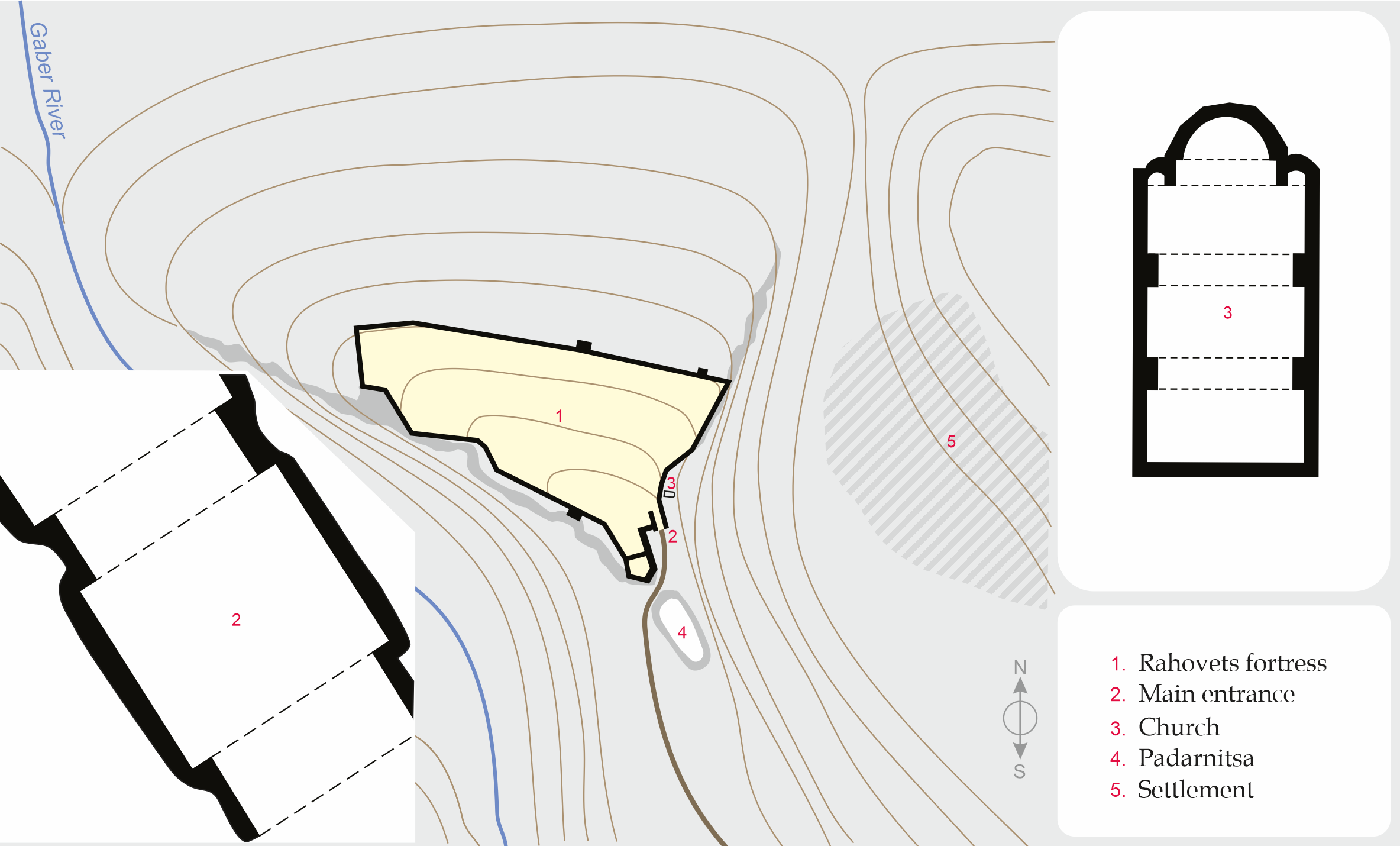
Plan of fortress Rahovets based on a scheme made by Karel Škorpil

Rahovets (Bulgarian: Раховец, Ряховец) was an ancient Thracian, medieval and Ottoman fortress in Northeastern Bulgaria. It is located on a hill close to the town of Gorna Oryahovitsa (2 km) and Veliko Tarnovo (5 km).

== Name ==
There is a dispute between historians as to where the name of the Ryahovets fortress comes from. According to some of them, it comes from the word Орех (oreh, 'walnut') related to the analogy "bony", "healthy as a walnut", which the fortress can certainly claim. According to other researchers, however, it comes from the word Рях (ryah, 'road').

== Complex ==
The fortress has an irregular shape, reminiscent of a triangle with a sharp point pointing south. Its maximum dimensions are 159x271 meters and covers an area of 23 acres. The fortress walls are made of quarry stones welded with white mortar. Their thickness reaches 3.88 meters. The fortification has three entrances. The main entrance is to the south.

== History ==
According to archeological research, the fortress was originally built by the Thracians. During the Roman Empire, the fortress continued to be used, and was especially intensive in the 3rd and 4th centuries. East under the fortification from this period is a rustic villa with bathroom and pool. Archaeological finds are also found from the early Byzantine era, as well as from the 9th and 10th centuries during the First Bulgarian Empire. Rahovets gained its greatest importance during the Second Bulgarian Empire, when it was the main post controlling the northern approaches to the capital Tarnovo. After the Ottoman invasion, the fortress continued to exist for another 50 years with a garrison, until its destruction in late September 1444 by the troops of Władysław III of Poland during his campaign against the Ottoman Empire. Then the fortress was finally abandoned. The earthquake in Gorna Oryahovitsa in 1913 destroyed the walls and towers of Rahovets.

== Archaeological research ==
The first research of Rahovets was made by Karel Škorpil. Detailed excavations of part of the fortress were made in 1985-1991. In 2015, after a 25-year hiatus, regular archaeological research began. Then the fortress Ryahovets was declared a cultural value of national importance.

== Sources ==
- Alexiev, J., Bachvarov, Iv., Vachev, H. Archaeological excavations of the fortress Rahovets. Collection Rahovets. Veliko Tarnovo, 1994
- Alexiev, J. Bachvarov, Iv., Excavations of the Ryahovts Fortress near Gorna Oryahovitsa, ARD 1985, Veliko Tarnovo 1986
- Alexiev, J. Bachvarov, Iv., Excavations of the Ryahovts Fortress near Gorna Oryahovitsa, ARD 1986, Razgrad 1987
- Alexiev, J. Bachvarov, Iv. Vachev, H. Excavations of the Ryahovts Fortress near Gorna Oryahovitsa, ARD 1987, Blagovegrad 1988
- Alexiev, J. Bachvarov, Iv. Vachev, H. Excavations of the Ryahovts Fortress near G. Oryahovitsa, ARD 1988, Kardzhali 1989
- Alexiev, J. Bachvarov, Iv. Vachev, H. Excavations of the Ryahovts Fortress near the town of Gorna Oryahovitsa, ARD 1989, Kyustendil 1990
- Petrakiev, I. Ivanova, M. Medieval fortress "Ryahovets", Gorna Oryahovitsa, ARD 2015, Sofia 2016
- Petrakiev, I. Ivanova, M. Medieval fortress "Ryahovets", Gorna Oryahovitsa, ARD 2016, Sofia 2017
- Petrakiev, I. Ivanova, M. Medieval fortress "Ryahovets", near the town of Gorna Oryahovitsa, ARD 2017, Sofia 2018
