= Tsvetochny =

Tsvetochny (masculine), Tsvetochnaya (feminine), or Tsvetochnoye (neuter) may refer to:

- Tsvetochny, Republic of Adygea, a settlement in the Republic of Adygea, Russia
- Tsvetochny, Kursk Oblast, a settlement in Kursk Oblast, Russia
- Tsvetochnoye, a settlement in Omsk Oblast, Russia
- Tsvetochny passage, street in Yuzhnoye Tushino District, Russia
