= M. V. Lomonosov School of Electrotechnics and Electronics =

Coordinates: 43.1283°N 25.6920°E

M. V. Lomonosov College of Electrical and Electronic Engineering
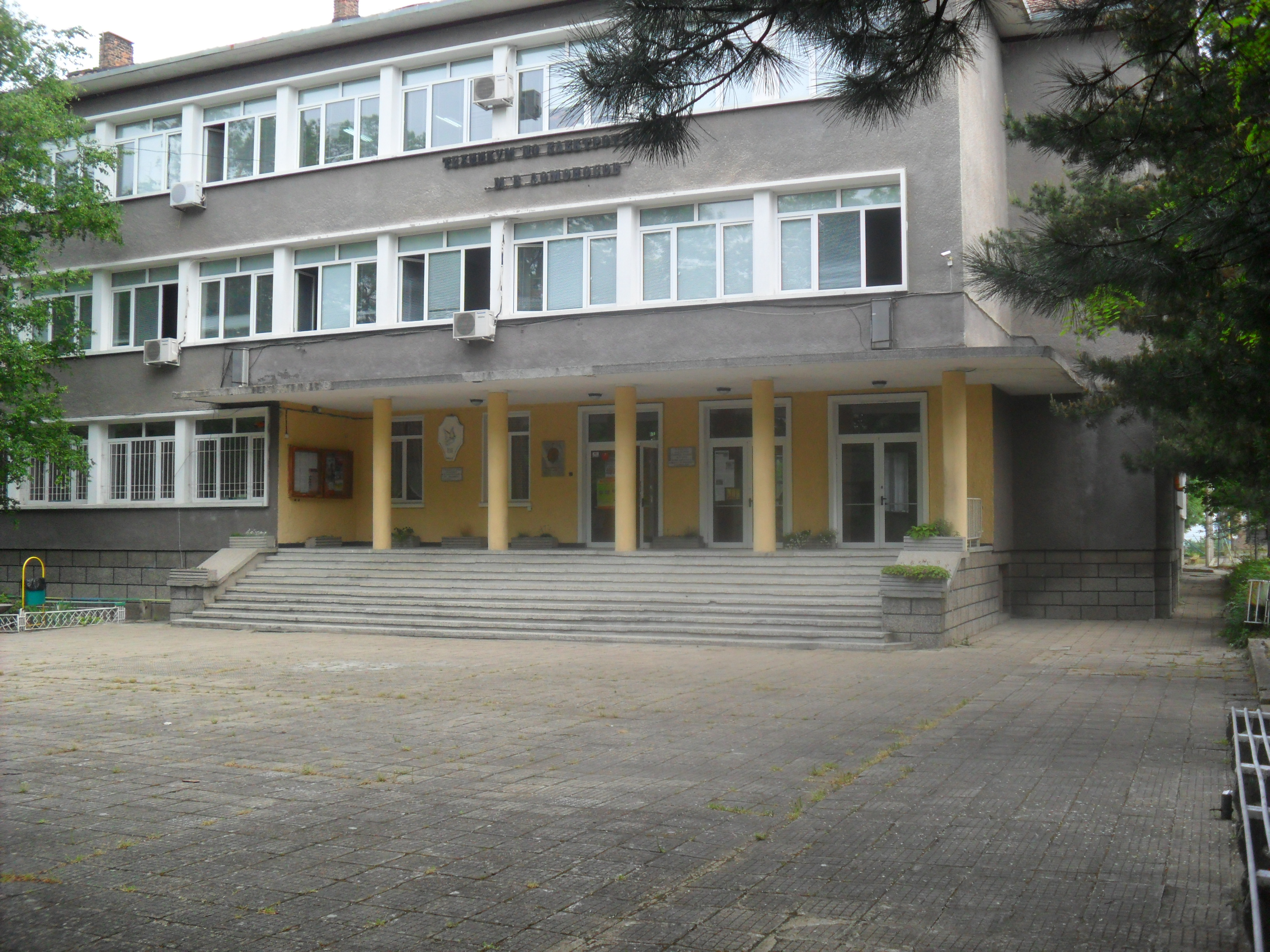
- Nikola Petrov 31; Bulgaria

Information
- Type: Engineering College
- Established: 1959
- Head of school: Philip Philipov
- Enrollment: 500
- Affiliation: Government
- Website: http://lomonosov-go.com/

The M. V. Lomonosov School of Electro-technics and Electronics (Bulgarian: Професионална гимназия по електротехника и електроника,( Professional College of Electrical and Electronic engineering ) is a Bulgarian professional Engineering school and one of the most selective technical schools in Bulgaria. The school is located in Gorna Oryahovitsa.

== History ==
=== Technicum for electrotechnics ===
M. V. Lomonosov College of Electrical and Electronics was founded in 1959 by the engineer Marco Genchev, as a successor to the Technical College in Gorna Oryahovitsa. Initially, lessons were taught in the building of "Georgi Izmirliev" School and in Gorna Oryahovitsa. The first year of instruction began on 15 September 1959.

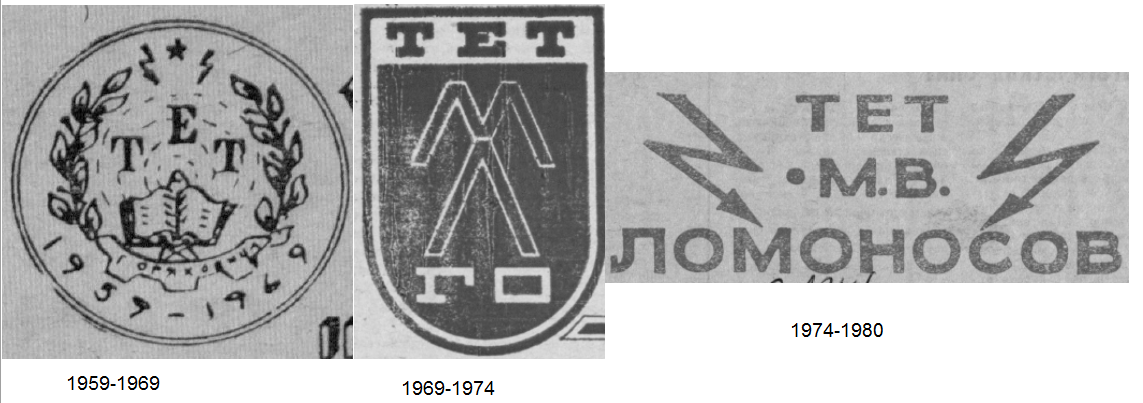
Symbols of M.V.Lomonossov`s school in Gorna Oryahovitsa

Teachers were "specialized" in subjects such as mathematics, history and foreign languages. Over fifty percent of the teachers were engineers, from a variety of engineering disciplines, including electrical, power and radio technology. The planning and construction of a dedicated building complex began in 1960.

In 1961, a meeting of the school committee chose a patron for their school. They chose Russian scientist Mikhail Lomonosov; in the 1962-1963 the official name of the school was M. V. Lomonosov School of Electricity (in Bulgarian:Техникум по електротехникe "Михайло Василиевич Ломоносов" (ТЕТ "В.М.Ломоносов")).

In 1965, the new building and park were finished. The building contained laboratories for radio, television, power electronics, and the study and applications of general electronics. The school had its own production center. Students took a role in manufacturing industrial solder, electric motors, radio antennas and other electronic items during their studies.

Teacher of Bulgarian language and literature, Yordan Yordanov, composed the first school song. At the end of the 1960s, it had created professional relationships with other technical schools in Bulgaria and East Europe. The most thorough collaboration was with the School of Electrical in Odessa.

In 1971 the northern portion of the school complex was completed. The construction included classrooms and further laboratories for technical studies. At that time the school offered were radio and television technology, electrical power, electrics and electrical machines. In 1973, a cinema was added, with seating for 500. From 1973 to 1974, the first cultural meeting exhibition occurred, showcasing student projects. From 1975 to 1976, a commemorative ceremony was held for the Bulgarian heroes of the April uprising.

=== School of Electrotechnics and Electronics ===
In 2001, the name of the school was changed to M. V. Lomonosov Professional High School of Electronics. Computer technologies, communications and computer networking were added to the school's curriculum in 2000. In 2006 the program added the Show of Electronics (Bulgarian: Шоуто на Жичка и Електричка, Shouto Na Zhuchka I Elektrichka). Since the founding of the school, around 10,000 students have graduated.

== Directors ==
- Marco Genchev Iliev (1959–1973)
- Dimitar Kovachev (1973–1984)
- Konstantin Konstantinov(1984–1989)
- Kina Markova (1989–1998)
- Dimitar Yonov (1998–2009)
- Kina Koltarska (2010)
- Filip Filipov (2010-)

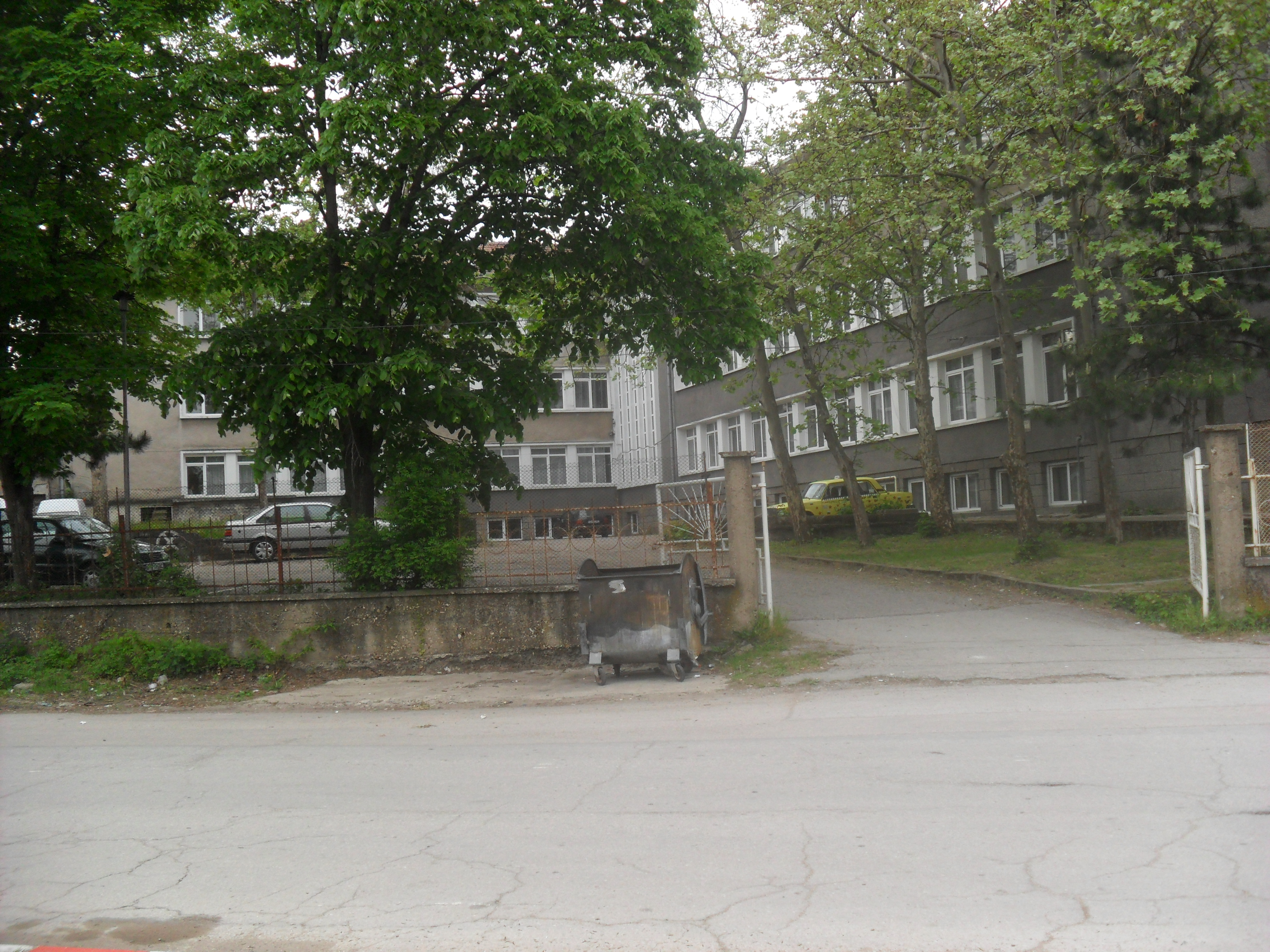
May 2015

== Courses ==
- Computer technology
- Computer networks
- New energy sources
- Electric systems
- Telecommunications
- Radio and television technology (ex-course)
- Electrical machines and appliances (ex-course)
- Electro-calculating technology (ex-course)

== Memberships ==
- The school has been a member of UNESCO since 1982.
- M. V. Lomonosov School of Electrotechnics and Electronics is member of United schools by United Nations
