= Lomonosov (surname) =

Lomonosov (masculine, Russian: Ломоносов) or Lomonosova (feminine, Russian: Ломоносова) is a Russian surname. Notable people with the surname include:

- Mikhail Lomonosov (1711–1765), Russian polymath, scientist, and writer
- Sergey Lomonosov (1799–1857), Russian diplomat
- Yury Lomonosov (1876–1952), Russian railway engineer
