= Tsvetan Gashevski =

Bulgarian arm wrestler

- Born: Sofia, Bulgaria
- Occupation: Arm wrestler

Tsvetan Gashevski (Bulgarian: Цветан Гашевски) (born 15 July 1970 in Sofia) is a Bulgarian arm wrestler. He lives and works in Gorna Oryahovitsa and he is one of the founders of the Gorna Oryahovitsa Arm Wrestling Club. Gashevski started his sport career with athletics but soon switched to Arm wrestling where he soon achieved great results - multiple Champion of Bulgaria in the 75 kg category (right hand).

== International competitions ==
| Year | Competition | Venue | Position | Notes |
|---|---|---|---|---|
| 1992 | International tournament | Geneva, | 1st | |
| 1992 | International tournament | Moscow, Russia | 3rd | |
| 1994 | European Championship | Sweden | 2nd | |
| 1994 | World Championship | Israel | 2nd | |
| 1995 | European Championship | Moscow, Russia | 1st | |
| 1996 | European Championship | Lithuania | 1st | |
| 1997 | European Championship | Lithuania | 1st | |
| 1998 | European Championship | Lithuania | 1st | |
| 2000 | World Championship | Rovaniemi, Finland | 1st | |
| 2001 | European Championship | Poland | 1st | |
| 2001 | World Championship | Gdynia, Poland | 1st | |
| 2003 | World Championship | Ottawa, Canada | 1st | Right hand (75kg) |
| 2004 | World Championship | Durban, South Africa | 1st | Right hand (75kg) |
| 2006 | World Championship | Manchester, England | 2nd | Right hand (75kg) |
| 2015 | World Championship | Kuala Lumpur, Malaysia | 2nd | Right hand (75kg) |
| 2021 | World Championship | Bucharest, Romania | 2nd | Right hand (80kg) |

He was one of the Top 10 sportspersons of Gorna Oryahovitsa in the 20th century and was awarded the prize of Gorna Oryahovitsa for sporting achievements in 2001 and made an Honorary Citizen of Gorna Oryahovitsa in 2002.

=== Notable matches ===
| Year | Opponent | Result | Hand | Outcome | Event |
|---|---|---|---|---|---|
| 2024 | Roby Russell | Won | Right Hand | 3-1 | Knuckles Up 4 |
| 2023 | Craig Tullier | Won | Right Hand | 3-0 | The High Five Arm Wrestling |
