= Lomonosov Current =

Deep current in the Atlantic Ocean. from the coast of Brazil to the Gulf of Guinea

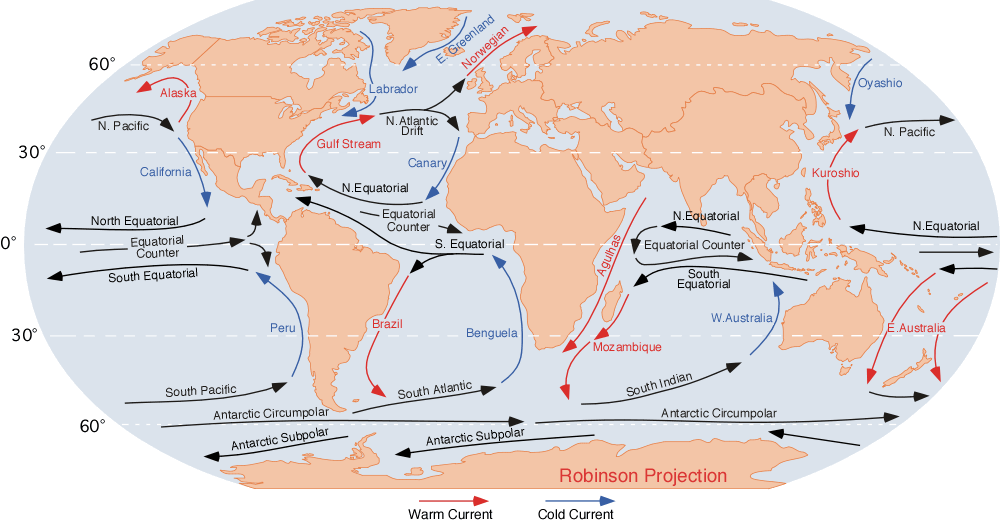
Ocean currents

The Lomonosov current (also called Lomonosov Under Current or Equatorial Under-Current) is a deep current in the Atlantic Ocean.

The Lomonosov current was discovered in 1959 during the 5th cruise of the research vessel Mikhail Lomonosov by an expedition of the Marine Hydrophysical Institute of the USSR Academy of Sciences, based in Sevastopol. Researchers onboard set four buoy stations containing current chart recorders at 30°W. One of them, that was set at the intersection of this meridian with the equator under the thin layer of the South Equatorial Current had recorded the strong current eastwards. Its average flow speed was 96 cm per second and maximal speed — 119 cm per second. It is named after Mikhail Lomonosov.

The Lomonosov current is 200 km wide, 150m thick and flows to the east. It starts near the coast of Brazil at some 5°N, crosses the equator and ends at some 5°S in the Gulf of Guinea. Its speed ranges from 60 to 130 cm per second, maximal speed being achieved at depths between 50 m and 125 m. Transport of the Lomonosov current ranges from 22.5 to 28.3 Sverdrup.

== See also ==
- Cromwell current, deep current in the Pacific Ocean
- Ocean current
- Oceanic gyres
- Physical oceanography
