= Tsvetochnoye =

Tsvetochnoye Цветочное
- Selo
- Location within Volgograd Oblast Location within Russia
- Coordinates: 50°20′N 46°45′E
- Country: Russia
- Region: Volgograd Oblast
- District: Staropoltavsky District
- Time zone: UTC+4:00

Tsvetochnoye (Russian: Цветочное) is a rural locality (a selo) in Gmelinskoye Rural Settlement, Staropoltavsky District, Volgograd Oblast, Russia. The population was 89 as of 2010. There are 2 streets.

== History ==
The village was founded as a small farmstead named Blumenfeld (am Mius) by Volga German colonists on the banks of the Yeruslan River. The parish was Lutheran and it was severely effected by the Povolzhye famine in 1921.

== Geography ==
Tsvetochnoye is located in steppe, on Transvolga, on the left bank of the Kuba River, 35 km southeast of Staraya Poltavka (the district's administrative centre) by road. Gmelinka is the nearest rural locality.
