= 1940 Swiss military referendum =

Referendum in Switzerland

| 1 December 1940 |
- Introduction of compulsory military preliminary training

Results
| Choice | Votes | % |
|---|---|---|
| Yes | 345,430 | 44.27% |
| No | 434,817 | 55.73% |
| Valid votes | 780,247 | 97.76% |
| Invalid or blank votes | 17,838 | 2.24% |
| Total votes | 798,085 | 100.00% |
| Registered voters/turnout | 1,254,578 | 63.61% |

A referendum on the military was held in Switzerland on 1 December 1940. Voters were asked whether they approved of amending articles 103 and 104 of the federal law that detailed the organisation of the Swiss military. The proposal was rejected by 55.7% of voters.

== Background ==
The referendum was an optional referendum, which only required a majority of the vote in favour, as opposed to a mandatory referendum, which required both a majority of the popular vote and majority of the cantons to be in favour.

== Results ==
| Choice | Votes | % |
|---|---|---|
| For | 345,430 | 44.3 |
| Against | 434,817 | 55.7 |
| Blank votes | 14,716 | – |
| Invalid votes | 3,122 | – |
| Total | 798,085 | 100 |
| Registered voters/turnout | 1,254,578 | 63.6 |
Source: Nohlen & Stöver
