= Apoplania penai =

Scientific classification
- Kingdom: Animalia
- Phylum: Arthropoda
- Class: Insecta
- Order: Lepidoptera
- Family: Neopseustidae
- Genus: Apoplania
- Species: A. penai

Binomial name
- Apoplania penai Davis & Nielsen , 1980

Species of archaic bell moth

Apoplania penai is a species of moth belonging to the family Neopseustidae. It was described by Donald R. Davis and Ebbe Nielsen in 1980. It is known from Argentina, south to Esquel and Chile, south to Chiloé Island.
