= 1949 Swiss referendums =

Four referendums were held in Switzerland during 1949. The first two were held on 22 May on revising article 39 of the federal constitution concerning the Swiss National Bank and a federal law amending a 1928 law on measures against tuberculosis, with both rejected by voters. The third was held on 11 September on a popular initiative "for the recurrence to direct democracy" and was narrowly approved. The final one was held on 11 December on a federal law to amend the employment status of federal civil servants, and was also approved.

== Background ==
The referendum on revising the constitution was a mandatory referendum. Together with the popular initiative, both required a double majority; a majority of the popular vote and majority of the cantons. The decision of each canton was based on the vote in that canton. Full cantons counted as one vote, whilst half cantons counted as half. The referendums on federal laws on tuberculosis and civil servants were both optional referendums, which required only a simple majority of votes in favour.

== Results ==
=== May: Constitutional amendment on the Swiss National Bank ===
Choice	Popular vote		Cantons		
Choice	Votes	%	Full	Half	Total
For	293,650	38.5	1	1	1.5
Against	468,823	61.5	18	5	20.5
Blank votes	81,909	–	–	–	–
Invalid votes	1,485	–	–	–	–
Total	845,867	100	19	6	22
Registered voters/turnout	1,385,582	61.0	–	–	–
Source: Nohlen & Stöver

=== May: Federal law on tuberculosis ===
Choice	Votes	%
For	202,863	24.8
Against	613,552	75.2
Blank votes	28,241	–
Invalid votes	1,211	–
Total	845,867	100
Registered voters/turnout	1,385,582	61.0
Source: Nohlen & Stöver

=== September: popular initiative ===
Choice	Popular vote		Cantons		
Choice	Votes	%	Full	Half	Total
For	280,755	50.7	11	3	12.5
Against	272,599	49.3	8	3	9.5
Blank votes	35,655	–	–	–	–
Invalid votes	1,941	–	–	–	–
Total	590,950	100	19	6	22
Registered voters/turnout	1,389,856	42.5	–	–	–
Source: Nohlen & Stöver

=== December: Federal law on civil servants ===
Choice	Votes	%
For	546,160	55.3
Against	441,785	44.7
Blank votes	14,552	–
Invalid votes	1,865	–
Total	1,004,362	100
Registered voters/turnout	1,394,818	72.0
Source: Nohlen & Stöver
