= 1890 Swiss insurance referendum =

Referendum in Switzerland concerning accident and health insurance

2 October 1890
- Federal decree regarding the supplement to the Federal Constitution of 29 May 1874 by an addition regarding the legislative right on accident and health insurance

Results
Choice	Votes	%
Yes	283,228	75.44%
No	92,200	24.56%
Valid votes	375,428	94.70%
Invalid or blank votes	21,020	5.30%
Total votes	396,448	100.00%
Registered voters/turnout	663,531	59.75%

A referendum on accident and health insurance was held in Switzerland on 2 October 1890. Voters were asked whether they approved of a federal resolution on amending the constitution with regard to accident and health insurance. It was approved by a majority of voters and cantons.

== Background ==
The referendum was a mandatory referendum, which as it pertained to the constitution, required both a majority of voters and cantons, as opposed to an optional referendum, which required only a majority of the public vote.

== Results ==
Choice	Popular vote		Cantons		
Choice	Votes	%	Full	Half	Total
For	283,228	75.4	18	5	20.5
Against	92,200	24.6	1	1	1.5
Blank votes	12,409	–	–	–	–
Invalid votes	8,611	–	–	–	–
Total	396,448	100	19	6	22
Registered voters/turnout	663,531	59.7	–	–	–
Source: Nohlen & Stöver
