= 1933 Swiss federal salaries referendum =

Referendum in Switzerland

28 May 1933
- Federal Act on the Temporary Reduction of Pay, Salaries and Wages of Persons in the Service of the Federal Government

Results
Choice	Votes	%
Yes	411,536	44.89%
No	505,190	55.11%
Valid votes	916,726	98.59%
Invalid or blank votes	13,123	1.41%
Total votes	929,849	100.00%
Registered voters/turnout	1,154,963	80.51%

A referendum on federal salaries was held in Switzerland on 28 May 1933. Voters were asked whether they approved of a federal law that would lower the salaries of federal officials on a temporary basis. The proposal was rejected by 55.1% of voters.

== Background ==
The referendum was an optional referendum, which only a majority of the vote, as opposed to the mandatory referendums, which required a double majority; a majority of the popular vote and majority of the cantons.

== Results ==
Choice	Votes	%
For	411,536	44.9
Against	505,190	55.1
Blank votes	11,164	–
Invalid votes	1,959	–
Total	929,849	100
Registered voters/turnout	1,154,963	80.5
Source: Nohlen & Stöver
