= 1877 Swiss referendum =

A three-part referendum was held in Switzerland on 21 October 1877. A federal law on working in factories was approved by voters, whilst a federal law on compensation for not serving in the military and a federal law on the political rights of settled and travelling people and the loss of rights for Swiss citizens were both rejected.

== Background ==
The referendum was classed as an optional referendum, which meant that only a majority of the public vote was required for the proposals to be approve, as opposed to the mandatory referendums that required both a majority of voters and cantons to approve the proposals.

== Results ==
=== Federal law on working in factories ===
Choice	Votes	%
For	181,204	51.5
Against	170,857	48.5
Invalid/blank votes		–
Total	352,061	100
Registered voters/turnout		
Source: Nohlen & Stöver

=== Federal law on compensation for not serving in the military ===
Choice	Votes	%
For	170,223	48.4
Against	181,383	51.6
Invalid/blank votes		–
Total	351,606	100
Registered voters/turnout		
Source: Nohlen & Stöver

=== Federal law on the political rights of settled and travelling people and on the loss of rights of Swiss citizens ===
Choice	Votes	%
For	131,557	38.2
Against	213,230	61.8
Invalid/blank votes		–
Total	344,787	100
Registered voters/turnout		
Source: Nohlen & Stöver
