= 1912 Swiss insurance referendum =

Referendum in Switzerland

4 February 1912
- Federal law on health and accident insurance

Results
Choice	Votes	%
Yes	287,565	54.36%
No	241,416	45.64%
Valid votes	528,981	98.09%
Invalid or blank votes	10,292	1.91%
Total votes	539,273	100.00%
Registered voters/turnout	839,212	64.26%

A referendum on insurance was held in Switzerland on 4 February 1912. Voters were asked whether they approved of a federal law on health and accident insurance. The proposal was approved by 54.4% of voters.

== Background ==
The referendum was an optional referendum, which only a majority of the vote, as opposed to the mandatory referendums, which required a double majority; a majority of the popular vote and majority of the cantons.

== Results ==
Choice	Votes	%
For	287,565	54.4
Against	241,816	45.6
Blank votes	6,735	–
Invalid votes	3,557	–
Total	539,273	100
Registered voters/turnout	839,212	64.3
Source: Nohlen & Stöver
