= 1906 Swiss foodstuffs referendum =

Referendum in Switzerland

10 June 1906
- Federal law on the movement of food and everyday objects

Results
Choice	Votes	%
Yes	245,397	62.58%
No	146,760	37.42%
Valid votes	392,157	97.21%
Invalid or blank votes	11,260	2.79%
Total votes	403,417	100.00%
Registered voters/turnout	784,769	51.41%

A referendum on foodstuffs was held in Switzerland on 10 June 1906. Voters were asked whether they approved of a new federal law concerning foodstuffs and basic commodities. The proposal was approved by 62.6% of voters.

== Background ==
The referendum was an optional referendum, which only a majority of the vote, as opposed to the mandatory referendums, which required a double majority; a majority of the popular vote and majority of the cantons.

== Results ==
Choice	Votes	%
For	245,397	62.6
Against	146,760	37.4
Blank votes	9,363	–
Invalid votes	1,897	–
Total	403,417	100
Registered voters/turnout	784,769	51.4
Source: Nohlen & Stöver
