= Financial referendum =

The financial referendum (also known as a budget referendum) is a form of the referendum and an instrument of direct democracy. It always relates to parts of the public budget of a government and allows citizens to vote directly on individual budget items.

Certain initial conditions are usually defined as a prerequisite for holding a financial referendum. In most cases, only budget items that exceed a certain absolute amount or a certain proportion of the total budget or investments that will burden the budget for a number of years can be subjected to a financial referendum.

The financial referendum may be either optional or mandatory. In its optional form a specified number of signatures from voters must be collected within a certain time period to trigger a vote on a budget item. A mandatory financial referendum automatically leads to a vote as soon as the conditions regarding the amount and duration of a budget item are met. Budget items that do not meet the specified conditions or that the local authority is legally obliged to do cannot be subject to a financial referendum.

== Switzerland ==
The financial referendum in Switzerland exists in all cantons and many municipalities. It does not exist however at the federal level. While a few cantons have used the instrument since the 19th century, it has only spread throughout Switzerland since the 1970s. Most cantons and municipalities do not allow both the optional or the mandatory financial referendum. In a few cantons both types exist, whereby higher requirements apply to the obligatory type.

An example from the Canton of Zurich, which included the financial referendum in the complete revision of its constitution in 2005:

Art. 39, point d):

Upon request, the following will be submitted to the people for a vote:

1. New one-off expenses of more than 6 million francs

2. new recurring expenses of more than 600,000 francs

The introduction of the financial referendum at federal level has been discussed in Switzerland for several decades, but has so far been rejected by a majority of Swiss political parties. Critics argue that a federal financial referendum could hinder the Federal Council in its freedom of action, and delay or even block important investments.

== United States ==
Colorado and some local governments have enacted a Taxpayer Bill of Rights which mandates any tax and spending increases exceeding a certain limit be approved by referendum.

== Effects and reception ==
Financial referendums have a moderating and disciplining effect on public funds and reduce centralization of government spending. Disproportionately high or unpopular expenditure will most likely not be approved by the citizens in referendums, and referendums are associated with significantly lower public expenditure and taxes. Controlling for other factors of spending and demographics, data from Swiss cantons shows having mandatory financial referendums cause an average reduction of government spending by 19%.

Proponents of the financial referendum argue it has features of citizen participation. Comparable to other procedures of citizen participation, it expands the democratic influence and citizens beyond the framework of the legislation to other socio-political issues. Its proponents therefore see the financial referendum as an important step towards further deepening democracy. It strengthens citizens' preoccupation with community finances and promotes awareness of public investment. Due to the largely positive experience with the financial referendum in Switzerland, some civil society organizations in Germany and Austria are calling for it to be introduced there as well. In many cases this would require a change in their respective constitutions because these often explicitly prohibit votes on parts of the budget, or simply no regulations exist for holding a financial referendum.

Critics of the financial referendum mostly argue that it could block important investments and limit the administration's ability to act. In addition, in contrast to the administration and parliament, citizens are often not in a position to objectively assess the appropriateness of larger budget expenditures.

== See also ==
- Direct democracy
- Participatory budgeting
