= 1889 Swiss insolvency referendum =

Referendum in Switzerland concerning insolvency and debt

| 17 November 1889 |
- Federal Law on Debt Enforcement and Bankruptcy

Results
| Choice | Votes | % |
|---|---|---|
| Yes | 244,317 | 52.86% |
| No | 217,921 | 47.14% |
| Valid votes | 462,238 | 98.64% |
| Invalid or blank votes | 6,380 | 1.36% |
| Total votes | 468,618 | 100.00% |
| Registered voters/turnout | 661,225 | 70.87% |

A referendum on a federal law on insolvency and debt was held in Switzerland on 17 November 1889. The new law was approved by 52.9% of voters.

== Background ==
The referendum was an optional referendum, which meant that only a majority of the public vote was required for the proposals to be approved, as opposed to a mandatory referendum, which required both a majority of voters and cantons.

== Results ==
| Choice | Votes | % |
|---|---|---|
| For | 244,317 | 52.9 |
| Against | 217,921 | 47.1 |
| Blank votes | 3,833 | – |
| Invalid votes | 2,547 | – |
| Total | 468,618 | 100 |
| Registered voters/turnout | 661,225 | 70.9 |
Source: Nohlen & Stöver
