= 1884 Swiss referendum =

A four-part referendum was held in Switzerland on 11 May 1884. All four were rejected by voters.

== Background ==
All four referendums were optional referendums, which meant that only a majority of the public vote was required for the proposals to be approved, as opposed to a mandatory referendum which required both a majority of voters and cantons.

== Results ==
=== Question I ===
Question I asked whether a federal law on the organisation of the federal departments for justice and the police should be enacted.

Choice	Votes	%
For	149,729	41.1
Against	214,916	58.9
Invalid votes	16,495	–
Total	381,140	100
Registered voters/turnout	634,299	60.1
Source: Nohlen & Stöver

=== Question II ===
Question II asked voters whether they approved of a federal resolution on patent taxes for salesmen.

Choice	Votes	%
For	174,195	47.9
Against	189,550	52.1
Invalid votes	17,370	–
Total	381,115	100
Registered voters/turnout	634,299	60.1
Source: Nohlen & Stöver

=== Question III ===
Question III asked voters whether they approved of an amendment to the federal criminal law made on 4 February 1853.

Choice	Votes	%
For	159,068	44.0
Against	202,773	56.0
Invalid votes	19,146	–
Total	380,987	100
Registered voters/turnout	634,299	60.1
Source: Nohlen & Stöver

=== Question IV ===
Question IV asked voters whether they approved of a federal resolution on a 10,000 CHF contribution to the cost of the Swiss embassy in Washington, D.C.

Choice	Votes	%
For	137,824	38.5
Against	219,728	61.5
Invalid votes	23,455	–
Total	381,007	100
Registered voters/turnout	634,299	60.1
Source: Nohlen & Stöver
