= 1944 Swiss unfair competition referendum =

Referendum in Switzerland

29 October 1944
- Unfair Competition Act

Results
Choice	Votes	%
Yes	343,648	52.92%
No	305,770	47.08%
Valid votes	649,418	96.29%
Invalid or blank votes	25,051	3.71%
Total votes	674,469	100.00%
Registered voters/turnout	1,324,498	50.92%

A referendum on unfair competition was held in Switzerland on 29 October 1944. Voters were asked whether they approved of a new federal law on unfair competition. The proposal was approved by 52.9% of voters.

== Background ==
The referendum was an optional referendum, which only a majority of the vote, as opposed to the mandatory referendums, which required a double majority; a majority of the popular vote and majority of the cantons.

== Results ==
Choice	Votes	%
For	343,648	52.9
Against	305,770	47.1
Blank votes	22,482	–
Invalid votes	2,569	–
Total	674,469	100
Registered voters/turnout	1,324,498	50.9
Source: Nohlen & Stöver
