= Referendum =

Direct vote on a specific proposal

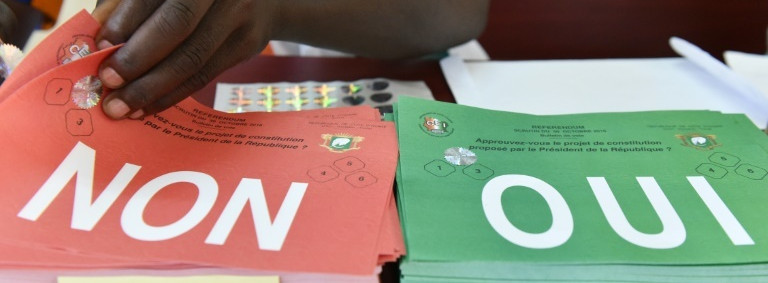
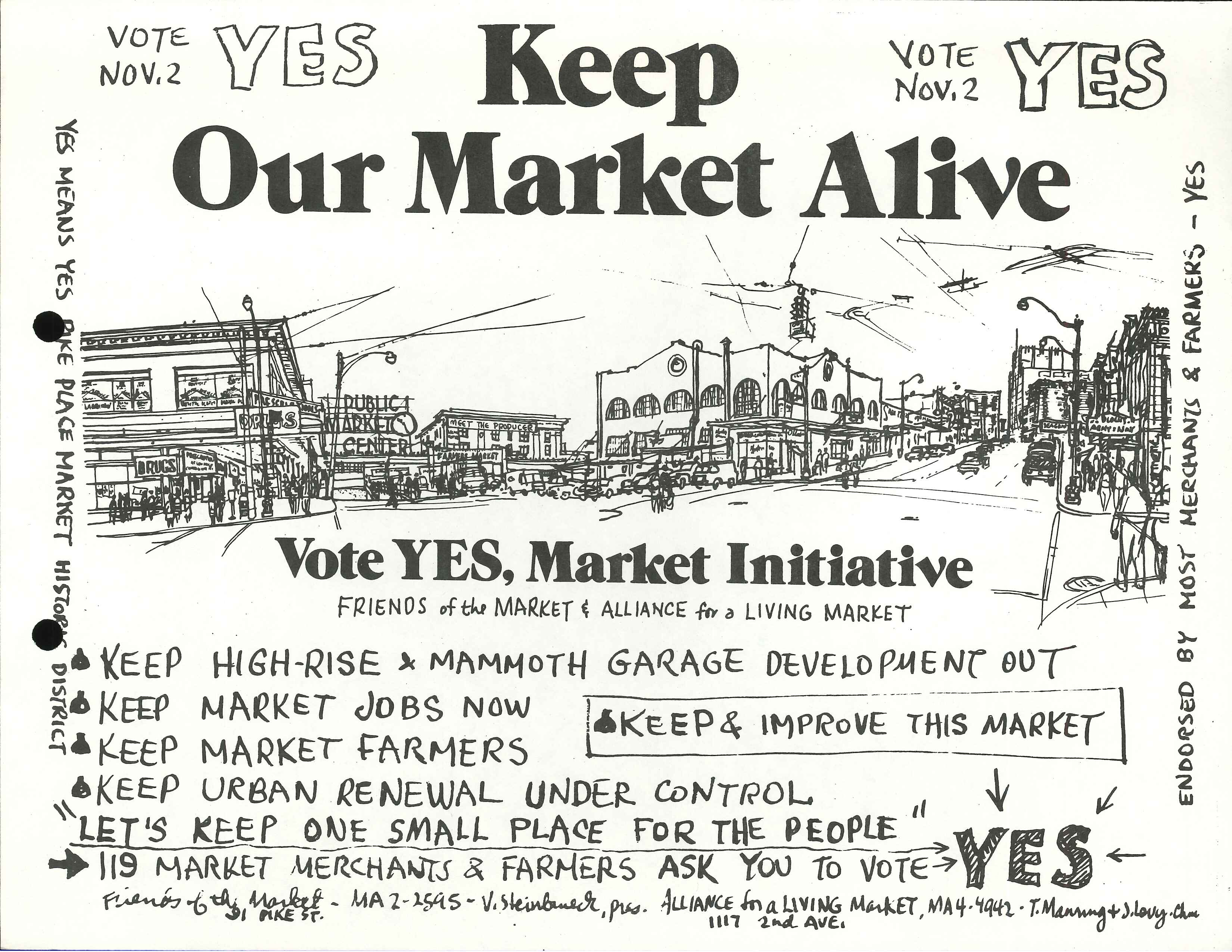
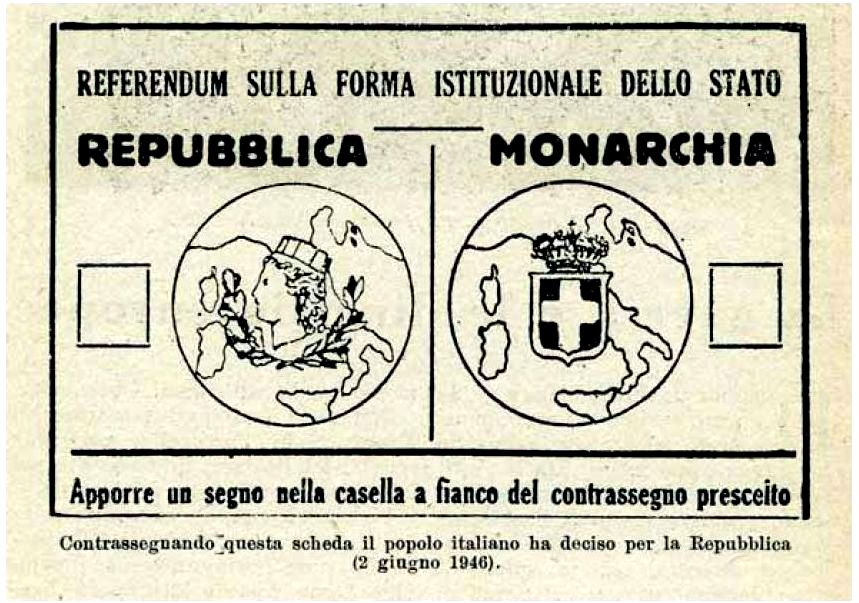
From top to bottom: ballots for the 2016 Ivorian constitutional referendum; flyer for a 1971 American referendum; the 1946 Italian institutional referendum deciding on republic or monarchy.

A referendum, plebiscite, or ballot measure is a direct vote by the electorate (rather than their representatives) on a proposal, law, or political issue. A referendum may be either binding, resulting in the adoption of a new policy, or consultive (or advisory), functioning like a large opinion poll.

== Etymology ==
'Referendum' is the gerundive form of the Latin verb referre, literally "to carry back" (from the verb ferre, "to bear, bring, carry" plus the inseparable prefix re-, here meaning "back"). As a gerundive is an adjective, not a noun, it cannot be used alone in Latin, and must be contained within a context attached to a noun such as Propositum quod referendum est populo, "A proposal which must be carried back to the people". The addition of the verb sum (3rd person singular, est) to a gerundive, denotes the idea of necessity or compulsion, that which "must" be done, rather than that which is "fit for" doing. Its use as a noun in English is not considered a strictly grammatical usage of a foreign word but is rather a newly coined English noun, which follows English grammatical usage, not Latin grammatical usage. This determines the form of the plural in English, which according to English grammar should be "referendums". The use of "referenda" as a plural form in English (treating it as a Latin word and attempting to apply to it the rules of Latin grammar) is unsupportable according to the rules of both Latin and English grammar. The use of "referenda" as a plural form is posited hypothetically as either a gerund or a gerundive by the Oxford English Dictionary, which rules out such usage in both cases as follows:

Referendums is logically preferable as a plural form meaning 'ballots on one issue' (as a Latin gerund, referendum has no plural). The Latin plural gerundive 'referenda', meaning 'things to be referred', necessarily connotes a plurality of issues.

It is closely related to agenda, "those matters which must be driven forward", from ago, to impel or drive forward; and memorandum, "that matter which must be remembered", from memoro, to call to mind, corrigenda, from rego, to rule, make straight, those things which must be made straight (corrected), etc.

The term 'plebiscite' has a generally similar meaning in modern usage and comes from the Latin plebiscita, which originally meant a decree of the Concilium Plebis (Plebeian Council), the popular assembly of the Roman Republic. Today, a referendum can also often be referred to as a plebiscite, but in some countries the two terms are used differently to refer to votes with differing types of legal consequences.

In Australia, a 'referendum' is often said to be a vote to change the federal constitution and 'plebiscite' a vote which does not affect the federal constitution. However, this is erroneous as not all federal referendums have been on constitutional matters (such as the 1916 Australian conscription referendum), and state votes that likewise do not affect either the federal or state constitution are frequently said to be referendums (such as the 2009 Western Australian daylight saving referendum). Historically, they are used by Australians interchangeably and a plebiscite is considered another name for a referendum.

In Ireland, 'plebiscite' referred to the vote to adopt its constitution, but a subsequent vote to amend the constitution is called a 'referendum', as is a poll of the electorate on a non-constitutional bill.

== History ==
The name and use of the 'referendum' is thought to have originated in the Swiss canton of Graubünden as early as the 16th century.

After a reduction in the number of referendums in the mid-twentieth century, the referendum as a political tool has been increasing in popularity since the 1970s. This increase has been attributed to dealignment of the public with political parties, as specific policy issues became more important to the public than party identifiers.

== Types ==
=== Classification ===
The term "referendum" covers a variety of different meanings, and the terminology is different depending on the use. A referendum can be binding or advisory. In some countries, different names are used for these two types of referendum. Referendums can be further classified by who initiates them.

David Altman proposes four dimensions that referendums can be classified by:

- Mandatory (legally required) vs optional (ad hoc)
- Binding vs consultative
- Citizen initiated (bottom-up) vs authorities initiated (top-down)
- Proactive (proposing a change) vs reactive (preventing a change)

=== Mandatory referendums ===
A mandatory referendum is a class of referendum required to be voted on if certain conditions are met or for certain government actions to be taken. They do not require any signatures from the public. In areas that use referendums a mandatory referendum is commonly used as a legally required step for ratification for constitutional changes, ratifying international treaties and joining international organizations, and certain types of public spending.

Typical types of mandatory referendums include:

- Constitutional changes: Some countries or local governments choose to enact any constitutional amendments with a mandatory referendum. These include Australia, Ireland, Switzerland, Denmark, and 49 of the 50 U.S. states (the only exception is Delaware).
- Financial referendum: Many localities require a referendum in order for the government to issue certain bonds, raise taxes above a specified amount, or take on certain amounts of debt. In California for example, the state government may not borrow more than $300,000 without a public vote in a statewide bond proposition.
- International relations: Switzerland has mandatory referendums on enacting international treaties that have to do with collective security and joining a supranational community. This type of referendum has only occurred once in the country's history: a failed attempt in 1986 for Switzerland to join the United Nations.
- War referendum: A hypothetical type of referendum, first proposed by Immanuel Kant, is a referendum to approve a declaration of war in a war referendum. It has never been enacted by any country, but was debated in the United States in the 1930s as the Ludlow Amendment.

=== Optional referendum ===
An optional referendum is a class of referendums that are put to the vote as a result of a demand. This may come from the executive branch, legislative branch, or a request from the people (often after meeting a signature requirement).

Types of optional referendums include:

- Authorities plebiscite: Also known as a legislative referral, are initiated by the legislature or government. These may be advisory questions to gauge public opinion or binding questions of law.
- Popular initiative or Initiative referendum: A citizen-led process to propose and vote on new laws.
- Popular referendum: A citizen-led process to oppose and strike down existing laws.
- Recall referendum: A procedure to remove elected officials before the end of their term of office. Depending on the area and position, a recall may be for a specific individual, such as an individual legislator, or more general such as an entire legislature.

== Rationale ==
From a political-philosophical perspective, referendums are an expression of direct democracy, but today, most referendums need to be understood within the context of representative democracy. They tend to be used quite selectively, covering issues such as changes in voting systems, where currently elected officials may not have the legitimacy or inclination to implement such changes.

== By country ==
Since the end of the 18th century, hundreds of national referendums have been organised in the world; almost 600 national votes have been held in Switzerland since its inauguration as a modern state in 1848. Italy ranks second with 78 national referendums: 72 popular referendums (51 of which were proposed by the Radical Party), 4 constitutional referendums, one institutional referendum and one advisory referendum.

== By issue ==
=== Civil rights referendum ===
A civil rights referendum or human rights referendum is any act of direct democracy which allows for a vote on the granting or amendment of current civil rights, liberties or associations as recognized by a government. Such referendums have frequently been proposed as a means by which the majority of the voting public in a polity, rather than the judicial or legislative chambers of government, could determine what the state should recognize or carry out, while such referendums have been strongly criticized by civil rights organizations and professional bodies as means by which the majority of the public could vote on the rights of a vulnerable minority according to contemporary prejudices.

=== Financial referendum ===
The financial referendum (also known as a budget referendum) is a form of the referendum and an instrument of direct democracy. It always relates to parts of the public budget of a government and allows citizens to vote directly on individual budget items.

=== Mining referendum ===
A mining referendum is a direct and universal vote in which an entire electorate is invited to vote on a mining proposal. Mining referendums have been held in Tambo Grande, Peru in 2002, Esquel, Argentina in 2003, and Cuenca, Ecuador in 2021. In each of the three cases the local community rejected the establishment of new mines in their territory.

=== Independence referendum ===
An independence referendum is a type of referendum in which the residents of a territory decide whether the territory should become an independent sovereign state. An independence referendum that results in a vote for independence does not always ultimately result in independence.

=== Referendums related to the European Union ===
This is a list of referendums related to the European Union, or referendums related to the European Communities, which were predecessors of the European Union. Since 1972, a total of 49 referendums have been held by EU member states, candidate states, and their territories, with several additional referendums held in countries outside the EU. The referendums have been held most commonly on the subject of whether to become a member of European Union as part of the accession process, although the EU does not require any candidate country to hold a referendum to approve membership or as part of treaty ratification. Other EU-related referendums have been held on the adoption of the euro and on participation in other EU-related policies.

== Design and procedure ==
=== Multiple-choice referendums ===
A referendum usually offers the electorate a straight choice between accepting or rejecting a proposal. However some referendums give voters multiple choices, and some use transferable voting. This has also been called a preferendum when the choices given allow the voters to weight their support for a policy.

In Switzerland, for example, multiple choice referendums are common. Two multiple choice referendums were held in Sweden, in 1957 and in 1980, in which voters were offered three options. In 1977, a referendum held in Australia to determine a new national anthem was held, in which voters had four choices. In 1992, New Zealand held a five-option referendum on their electoral system. In 1982, Guam had a referendum that used six options, with an additional blank option for those wishing to (campaign and) vote for their own seventh option.

A multiple choice referendum poses the question of how the result is to be determined. They may be set up so that if no single option receives the support of an absolute majority (more than half) of the votes, resort can be made to the two-round system or instant-runoff voting, which is also called IRV and PV.

In 2018 the Irish Citizens' Assembly considered the conduct of future referendums in Ireland, with 76 of the members in favour of allowing more than two options, and 52% favouring preferential voting in such cases. Other people regard a non-majoritarian methodology like the Modified Borda Count (MBC) as more inclusive and more accurate.

Swiss referendums offer a separate vote on each of the multiple options as well as an additional decision about which of the multiple options should be preferred. In the Swedish case, in both referendums the 'winning' option was chosen by the Single Member Plurality ("first past the post") system. In other words, the winning option was deemed to be that supported by a plurality, rather than an absolute majority, of voters. In the 1977 Australian referendum, the winner was chosen by the system of preferential instant-runoff voting (IRV). Polls in Newfoundland (1949) and Guam (1982), for example, were counted under a form of the two-round system, and an unusual form of TRS was used in the 1992 New Zealand poll.

Although California has not held multiple-choice referendums in the Swiss or Swedish sense (in which only one of several counter-propositions can be victorious, and the losing proposals are wholly null and void), it does have so many yes-or-no referendums at each election day that conflicts arise. The State's constitution provides a method for resolving conflicts when two or more inconsistent propositions are passed on the same day. This is a de facto form of approval voting—i.e. the proposition with the most "yes" votes prevails over the others to the extent of any conflict.

Other voting systems that could be used in multiple-choice referendum are Condorcet method and quadratic voting (including quadratic funding).

=== Electronic referendum ===
An electronic referendum (or e-referendum) is a referendum in which voting is aided by electronic means. E-referendum employs information and communication technology such as the Internet (e-voting) or digital telephones rather than a classical ballot box or traditional methods system. Traditionally, e-referendums are organised by governmental bodies, but nowadays, there exist private companies that can facilitate online referendums or other types of e-voting.

== Participation quorum ==
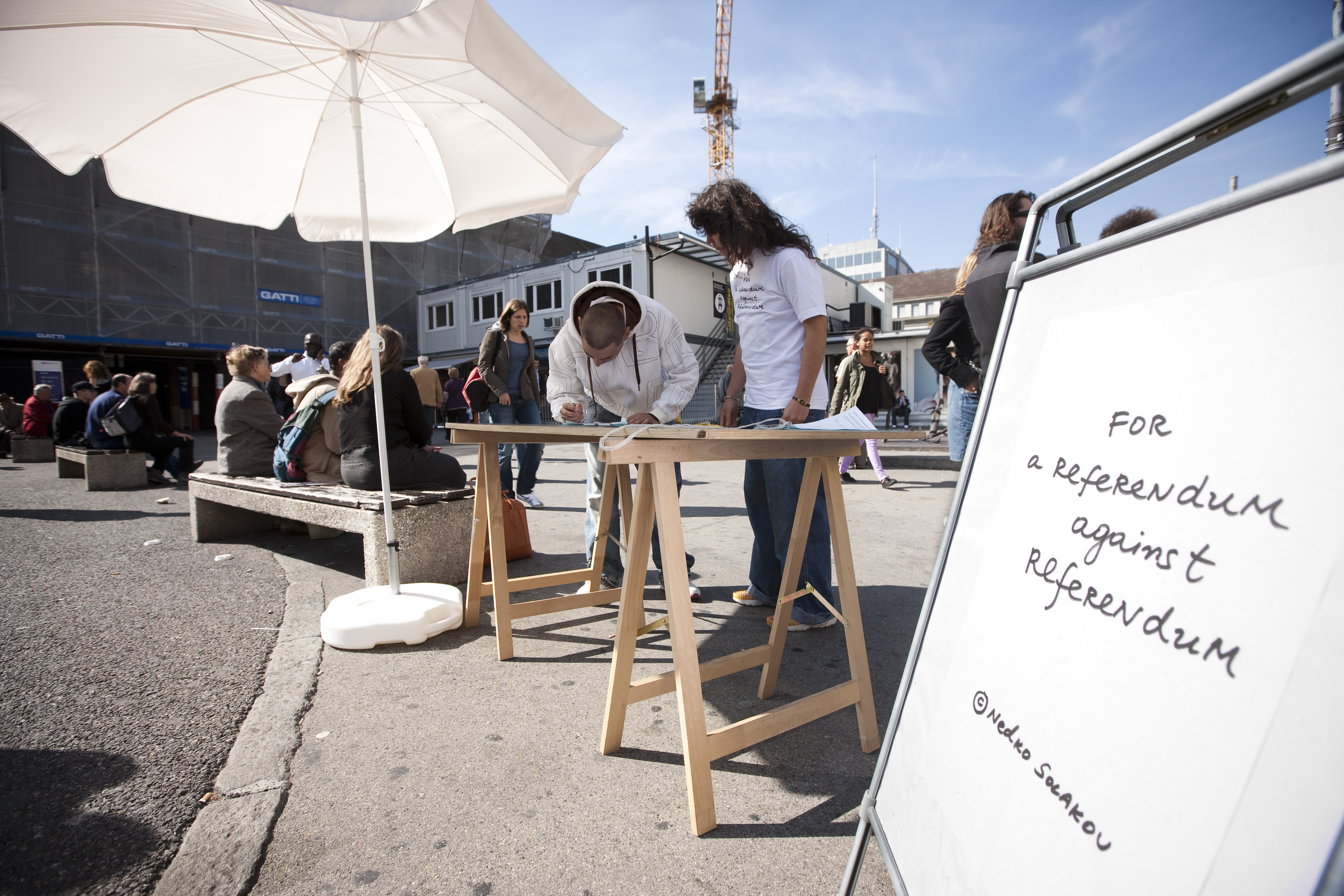
Nedko Solakov's artistic and humouristic project "Référendum against référendums", for the Swiss Sculpture Exhibition Utopics in 2009

Participation quorum - the additional requirement that a certain minimum number of votes must be cast in order for a referendum to be legally valid - means that it is in the interests of a proposal’s opponents to abstain rather than to vote against it, so that the quorum is not met. The opponents need only desert the ballot box in order to impose their viewpoint, even when they are very much in the minority. All others who are not voting for other reasons, including those with no opinion, are effectively also voting against the referendum.

The participation quorum requirement encourages a host of controversial election practices such as falsifing the turn-out rate, voter suppression and manipulating the date of the referendum to reduce turnout. It has been shown both empirically and mathematically that a participation quorum requirement reduces turnout to below the quorum theshold, which is known as the "quorum paradox" (a form of the no-show paradox).

The "quorum paradox" arises from the fact that, unlike in deliberative bodies such as parliaments—where a vote can be postponed to a later meeting if a quorum is not reached—referendums cannot be rescheduled.

An example of the participation quorum phenomenon is the 2005 Italian fertility laws referendum, in which the opposition to the proposed loosening of laws on research on embryos and on allowing in-vitro fertilization, campaigned for people to abstain from voting to drive down turnout. Although a majority of people voted yes for the changes in the law, the results were invalid because participation was low.

The European Commission for Democracy through Law (Venice Commission) recommends against any quorum requirements in its Code for Good Practice on Referendums

== Disputes ==
Important referendums are frequently challenged in courts. In pre-referendum disputes, plaintiffs have often tried to prevent the referendum to take place. In one such challenge, in 2017, the Spanish Constitutional Court suspended the Catalonia's independence referendum. In post-referendum disputes, they challenge the result. British courts dismissed post-referendum challenges of the Brexit referendum.

International tribunals have traditionally not interfered with referendum disputes. In 2021, the European Court of Human Rights extended its jurisdiction to referendums in its judgment Toplak and Mrak v. Slovenia, initiated by two disabled voters over polling place access.

== Criticisms ==
=== Criticism of populist aspect ===
Some opposition to the referendum has arisen from the use of government initiated, after-the-fact or non-legally binding plebiscites, by dictators such as Adolf Hitler who used them to endorse decisions already put into effect. Dictators may also make use of government initiated referendums as well as show elections to further legitimize their authority such as António de Oliveira Salazar in 1933; Benito Mussolini in 1934; Adolf Hitler in 1934, 1936; Francisco Franco in 1947; Park Chung Hee in 1972; and Ferdinand Marcos in 1973. Hitler's use of plebiscites is argued as the reason why, since World War II, there has been no provision in Germany for the holding of referendums at the federal level.

Turnout in referendums is generally lower than in candidate elections because parties have fewer incentives to mobilize voters. In addition, research suggests that referendums are seen more favorably by voters in party systems with fewer viable parties, suggesting that voters see them as a remedy to poor representation in less proportional systems.

In recent years, referendums have been used strategically by several European governments trying to pursue political and electoral goals.

In 1995, John Bruton considered that

All governments are unpopular. Given the chance, people would vote against them in a referendum. Therefore avoid referendums. Therefore don't raise questions which require them, such as the big versus the little states.

=== Closed questions and the separability problem ===
Some critics of the referendum attack the use of closed questions. A difficulty called the separability problem can plague a referendum on two or more issues. If one issue is in fact, or in perception, related to another on the ballot, the imposed simultaneous voting of first preference on each issue can result in an outcome which is displeasing to most.

=== Undue limitations on regular government power ===
Several commentators have noted that the use of citizens' initiatives to amend constitutions has so tied the government to a jumble of popular demands as to render the government unworkable. A 2009 article in The Economist argued that this had restricted the ability of the California state government to tax the people and pass the budget, and called for an entirely new Californian constitution.

A similar problem also arises when elected governments accumulate excessive debts. That can severely reduce the effective margin for later governments.

Both these problems can be moderated by a combination of other measures as

- strict rules for correct accounting on budget plans and effective public expenditure;
- mandatory assessment by an independent public institution of all budgetary implications of all legislative proposals, before they can be approved;
- mandatory prior assessment of the constitutional coherence of any proposal;
- interdiction of extra-budget expenditure (tax payers anyway have to fund them, sooner or later).

=== Irreversibility ===
Unlike elections, referendums are generally held occasionally rather than periodically, and do not provide the same recurring opportunities for opposition and accountability. Qvortrup and Trueblood argue that this is particularly significant for binding constitutional referendums, whose results may be difficult to reverse in the medium to long term. They also note that referendums can be used by executives to bypass legislatures and representatives. Citing Arnold Zurcher’s study of referendums in Nazi Germany, they argue that the removal of turnout requirements reduced the level of popular support required for proposals to pass. They contend that turnout thresholds can make such manipulation more difficult by requiring broader participation.

== Sources ==
- The Federal Authorities of the Swiss Confederation, statistics (German). Statistik Schweiz – Stimmbeteiligung
- Turcoane, Ovidiu (2015). "A proposed contextual evaluation of referendum quorum using fuzzy logics" (PDF). Journal of Applied Quantitative Methods. 10 (2): 83–93.

== See also ==
- Right to petition
- Deliberative referendum
