= 1875 Swiss referendum =

Swiss federal law referendum

A two-part referendum was held in Switzerland on 23 May 1875. A new federal law establishing and certifying civil status and marriage was narrowly approved, whilst a new federal law on suffrage was narrowly rejected.

== Background ==
This was the first optional referendum held in the country, as all previous referendums had been mandatory referendums. Whilst obligatory referendums required both a majority of voters and a majority of cantons in favour, optional referendums required only a majority of the public vote.

== Results ==
=== Federal law on the establishment of civil status and marriage ===
Choice	Votes	%
For	213,199	51.0
Against	205,069	49.0
Invalid/blank votes		–
Total	418,268	100
Registered voters/turnout		
Source: Nohlen & Stöver

=== Federal law on suffrage ===
Choice	Votes	%
For	202,583	49.4
Against	207,263	50.6
Invalid/blank votes		–
Total	409,846	100
Registered voters/turnout		
Source: Nohlen & Stöver
