= 1907 Swiss armed forces referendum =

Referendum in Switzerland

3 November 1907
- Military Organization of the Swiss Confederation

Results
Choice	Votes	%
Yes	329,953	55.22%
No	267,605	44.78%
Valid votes	597,558	98.94%
Invalid or blank votes	6,373	1.06%
Total votes	603,931	100.00%
Registered voters/turnout	808,916	74.66%

A referendum on the armed forces was held in Switzerland on 3 November 1907. Voters were asked whether they approved of the organisation of the federal armed forces. The proposal was approved by 55% of voters.

== Background ==
The referendum was an optional referendum, which only a majority of the vote, as opposed to the mandatory referendums, which required a double majority; a majority of the popular vote and majority of the cantons.

== Results ==
Choice	Votes	%
For	329,953	55.22
Against	267,605	44.78
Total	597,558	100.00
Valid votes	597,558	98.94
Invalid votes	2,807	0.46
Blank votes	3,566	0.59
Total votes	603,931	100.00
Registered voters/turnout	808,916	74.66
Source: Nohlen & Stöver
