= Apoplania chilensis =

Scientific classification
- Kingdom: Animalia
- Phylum: Arthropoda
- Clade: Pancrustacea
- Class: Insecta
- Order: Lepidoptera
- Family: Neopseustidae
- Genus: Apoplania
- Species: A. chilensis

Binomial name
- Apoplania chilensis D.R. Davis, 1975

Species of archaic bell moth

Apoplania chilensis is a species of moth belonging to the family Neopseustidae. It was described by D.R. Davis in 1975. It is known from heavily forested areas of central Chile at elevations of 600 to 1,000 meters.

The wingspan is 15–19 mm for males and about 20 mm for females. It occurs in forest habitats dominated by plant genera as Nothofagus and Chusquea. Most of its known range lies within the faunal region characterized as the Northern Valdivian Forest. The holotype of Apoplania chilensis was collected during the day by sweeping bushes bordering a mountain stream near Recinto. All paratypes were collected at night from a white sheet suspended before a gasoline pressure lantern.
