= Neopseustis archiphenax =

Scientific classification
- Kingdom: Animalia
- Phylum: Arthropoda
- Class: Insecta
- Order: Lepidoptera
- Family: Neopseustidae
- Genus: Neopseustis
- Species: N. archiphenax

Binomial name
- Neopseustis archiphenax Meyrick, 1928

Species of archaic bell moth

Neopseustis archiphenax is a species of moth belonging to the family Neopseustidae. It was described by Edward Meyrick in 1928. It is known from upper Burma and the Sichuan Province in China.

The wingspan is 26–27 mm.
