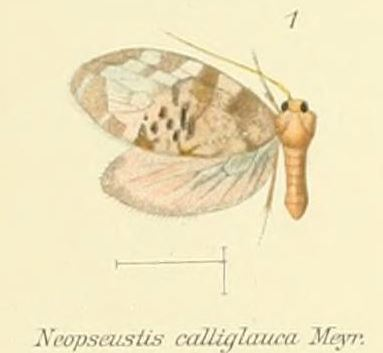

Scientific classification
- Kingdom: Animalia
- Phylum: Arthropoda
- Class: Insecta
- Order: Lepidoptera
- Family: Neopseustidae
- Genus: Neopseustis
- Species: N. calliglauca

Binomial name
- Neopseustis calliglauca Meyrick, 1909

= Neopseustis calliglauca =

Species of archaic bell moth

Neopseustis calliglauca is a species of moth belonging to the family Neopseustidae. It was described by Edward Meyrick in 1909. It is only found in the Khasi Hills of north-eastern India.

The wingspan is 15–17.2 mm. Adults have been found at a very restricted area just above a stream at the top of a fruit garden. They have been found during the day, resting on leaves and closely resembled birds' droppings.
