= Nematocentropus omeiensis =

Scientific classification
- Kingdom: Animalia
- Phylum: Arthropoda
- Class: Insecta
- Order: Lepidoptera
- Family: Neopseustidae
- Genus: Nematocentropus
- Species: N. omeiensis

Binomial name
- Nematocentropus omeiensis Hwang, 1965

Species of archaic bell moth

Nematocentropus omeiensis is a species of moth belonging to the family Neopseustidae. It was described by Hwang in 1965. It is known from Mount Omei in the Sichuan Province of China.
