= 1905 Swiss copyright referendum =

Referendum in Switzerland

- 19 March 1905
- Federal decree regarding the revision of Art. 64 of the Federal Constitution (extension of inventor protection)

Results
Choice	Votes	%
Yes	199,187	70.35%
No	83,935	29.65%
Valid votes	283,122	91.06%
Invalid or blank votes	27,783	8.94%
Total votes	310,905	100.00%
Registered voters/turnout	776,394	40.04%

A referendum on copyright was held in Switzerland on 19 March 1905. Voters were asked whether they approved of a federal resolution on revising article 64 of the constitution, defining the protection rights of inventors. It was approved by 70.4% of voters and a majority of cantons.

== Background ==
The referendum was a mandatory referendum, which required a double majority; a majority of the popular vote and majority of the cantons. The decision of each canton was based on the vote in that canton. Full cantons counted as one vote, whilst half cantons counted as half.

== Results ==
Choice	Popular vote		Cantons		
Choice	Votes	%	Full	Half	Total
For	199,187	70.4	19	5	21.5
Against	83,935	29.6	0	1	0.5
Blank votes	23,452	–	–	–	–
Invalid votes	4,331	–	–	–	–
Total	310,905	100	19	6	22
Registered voters/turnout	776,394	40.0	–	–	–
Source: Nohlen & Stöver
