= Neopseustis bicornuta =

Scientific classification
- Kingdom: Animalia
- Phylum: Arthropoda
- Clade: Pancrustacea
- Class: Insecta
- Order: Lepidoptera
- Family: Neopseustidae
- Genus: Neopseustis
- Species: N. bicornuta

Binomial name
- Neopseustis bicornuta D.R. Davis, 1975

Species of archaic bell moth

Neopseustis bicornuta is a species of moth belonging to the family Neopseustidae. It was described by D.R. Davis in 1975. It is known from the type-locality, Mount Omei, located in the south-western area of Sichuan Province, China as well as Mount Gong Gashan, also in Sichuan.

The wingspan is about 19 mm.
