= 1926 Swiss grain supply referendum =

Referendum in Switzerland

5 December 1926
- Federal decree on the inclusion of a new Article 23bis in the Federal Constitution regarding the state's grain supply

Results
Choice	Votes	%
Yes	366,507	49.62%
No	372,049	50.38%
Valid votes	738,556	98.18%
Invalid or blank votes	13,678	1.82%
Total votes	752,234	100.00%
Registered voters/turnout	1,034,547	72.71%

A referendum on grain supply was held in Switzerland on 5 December 1926. Voters were asked whether they approved of adding article 23bis to the constitution, which concerned grain supply. The proposal was rejected by a majority of voters and cantons.

== Background ==
The referendum was a mandatory referendum, which required a double majority; a majority of the popular vote and majority of the cantons. The decision of each canton was based on the vote in that canton. Full cantons counted as one vote, whilst half cantons counted as half.

== Results ==
Choice	Popular vote		Cantons		
Choice	Votes	%	Full	Half	Total
For	366,507	49.6	9	0	9
Against	372,049	50.4	10	6	13
Blank votes	11,378	–	–	–	–
Invalid votes	2,300	–	–	–	–
Total	752,234	100	19	6	22
Registered voters/turnout	1,034,547	72.7	–	–	–
Source: Nohlen & Stöver
