= 1913 Swiss disease control referendum =

Referendum in Switzerland

| 4 May 1913 |
- Federal decree regarding the revision of Articles 69 and 31, paragraph 2, letter d, of the Federal Constitution (control of human and animal diseases)

Results
| Choice | Votes | % |
|---|---|---|
| Yes | 169,012 | 60.32% |
| No | 111,163 | 39.68% |
| Valid votes | 280,175 | 92.10% |
| Invalid or blank votes | 24,031 | 7.90% |
| Total votes | 304,206 | 100.00% |
| Registered voters/turnout | 844,175 | 36.04% |

A referendum on disease control was held in Switzerland on 4 May 1913. Voters were asked whether they approved of amending two articles of the constitution, 31 II, lit d and 69, which covered the control of human and animal diseases. It was approved by a majority of voters and cantons.

== Background ==
The referendum was a mandatory referendum, which required a double majority; a majority of the popular vote and majority of the cantons. The decision of each canton was based on the vote in that canton. Full cantons counted as one vote, whilst half cantons counted as half.

== Results ==
| Choice | Popular vote | | Cantons | | |
| Choice | Votes | % | Full | Half | Total |
|---|---|---|---|---|---|
| For | 169,012 | 60.3 | 15 | 5 | 17.5 |
| Against | 111,163 | 39.7 | 4 | 1 | 4.5 |
| Blank votes | 16,409 | – | – | – | – |
| Invalid votes | 7,622 | – | – | – | – |
| Total | 304,206 | 100 | 19 | 6 | 22 |
| Registered voters/turnout | 844,175 | 36.0 | – | – | – |
Source: Nohlen & Stöver
