= Neopseustis sinensis =

Scientific classification
- Kingdom: Animalia
- Phylum: Arthropoda
- Clade: Pancrustacea
- Class: Insecta
- Order: Lepidoptera
- Family: Neopseustidae
- Genus: Neopseustis
- Species: N. sinensis

Binomial name
- Neopseustis sinensis D.R. Davis, 1975

Species of archaic bell moth

Neopseustis sinensis is a species of moth belonging to the family Neopseustidae. It was described by D.R. Davis in 1975. It is known from the Sichuan Province in south-western China.

The wingspan is 23–24 mm.
