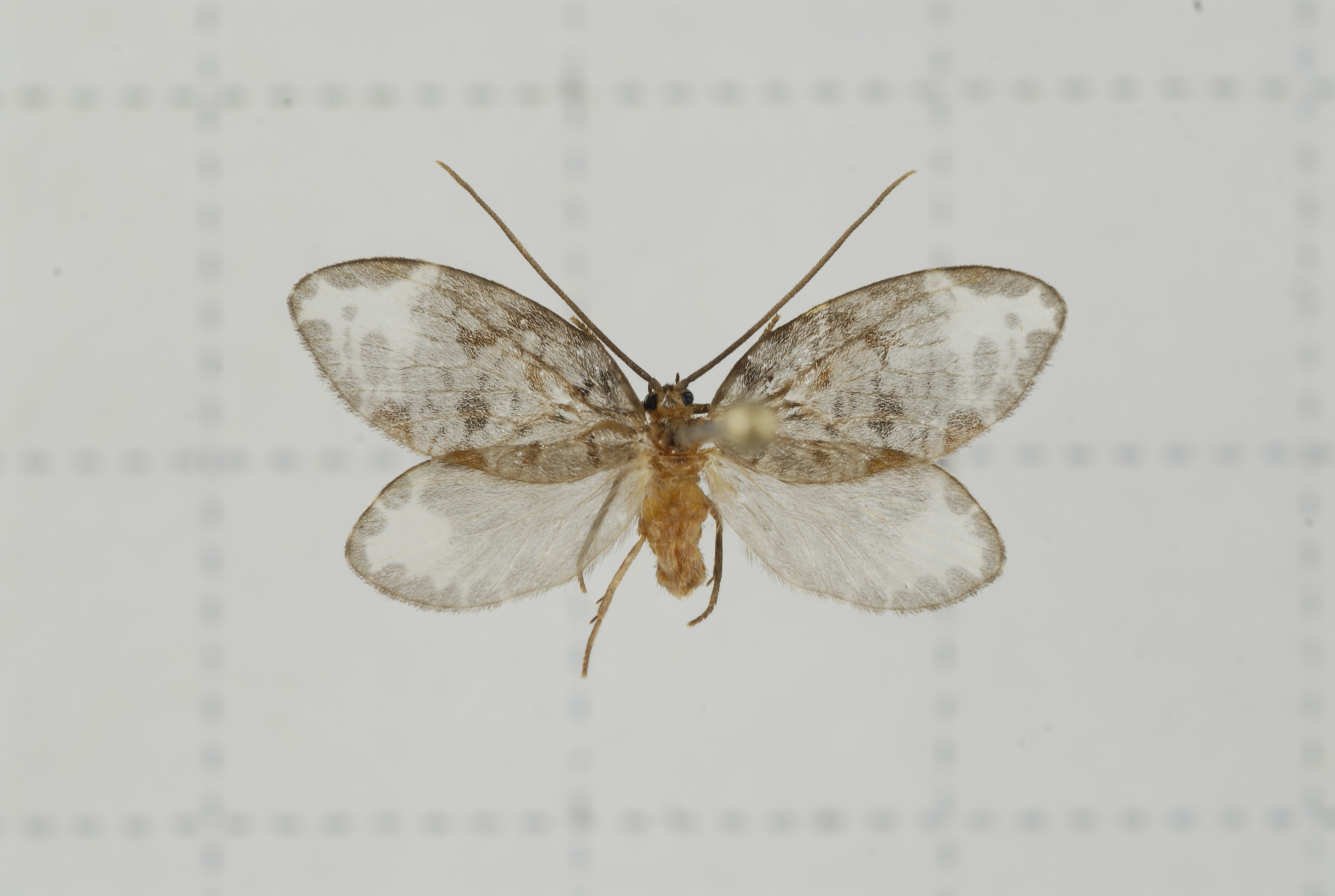

Scientific classification
- Kingdom: Animalia
- Phylum: Arthropoda
- Clade: Pancrustacea
- Class: Insecta
- Order: Lepidoptera
- Family: Neopseustidae
- Genus: Neopseustis
- Species: N. meyricki

Binomial name
- Neopseustis meyricki Hering, 1925

Synonyms
- Formopseustis takamukui Matsumura, 1931

= Neopseustis meyricki =

Species of archaic bell moth

Neopseustis meyricki is a species of moth belonging to the family Neopseustidae. It was described by Hering in 1925. It is known from the central highlands of Taiwan, where it occurs rather widely at elevations exceeding 1,000 meters.

The wingspan is 20 mm for males and 20–22 mm for females.
