= Neopseustis fanjingshana =

Scientific classification
- Kingdom: Animalia
- Phylum: Arthropoda
- Class: Insecta
- Order: Lepidoptera
- Family: Neopseustidae
- Genus: Neopseustis
- Species: N. fanjingshana

Binomial name
- Neopseustis fanjingshana Yang, 1988

Species of archaic bell moth

Neopseustis fanjingshana is a species of moth belonging to the family Neopseustidae. It was described by Yang in 1988. It is known from the Guizhou Province and Hunan Province in China.

The wingspan is about 17 mm. Adults were collected resting on a light trap set at break of dawn.
