= Apoplania valdiviana =

Scientific classification
- Kingdom: Animalia
- Phylum: Arthropoda
- Class: Insecta
- Order: Lepidoptera
- Family: Neopseustidae
- Genus: Apoplania
- Species: A. valdiviana

Binomial name
- Apoplania valdiviana Davis & Nielsen, 1985

Species of archaic bell moth

Apoplania valdiviana is a species of moth belonging to the family Neopseustidae. It was described by Donald R. Davis & Ebbe Nielsen in 1985. It is known from the south-western part of the Neuquen Province of Argentina and the eastern part of the Osorno Province and the Cautin Province in Chile.
