= Neopseustis moxiensis =

Scientific classification
- Kingdom: Animalia
- Phylum: Arthropoda
- Class: Insecta
- Order: Lepidoptera
- Family: Neopseustidae
- Genus: Neopseustis
- Species: N. moxiensis

Binomial name
- Neopseustis moxiensis Chen & Owada, 2009

Species of archaic bell moth

Neopseustis moxiensis is a species of moth belonging to the family Neopseustidae. It was described by Liusheng Chen, Mamoru Owada, Min Wang, and Yang Long in 2009. It is known from the Sichuan Province in China.

The wingspan is 19–20 mm.

== Etymology ==
The species is named for the locality: Moxi Town, Luding County in the Sichuan Province in China.
