= Harry V. Jaffa =

American historian and political philosopher (1918–2015)

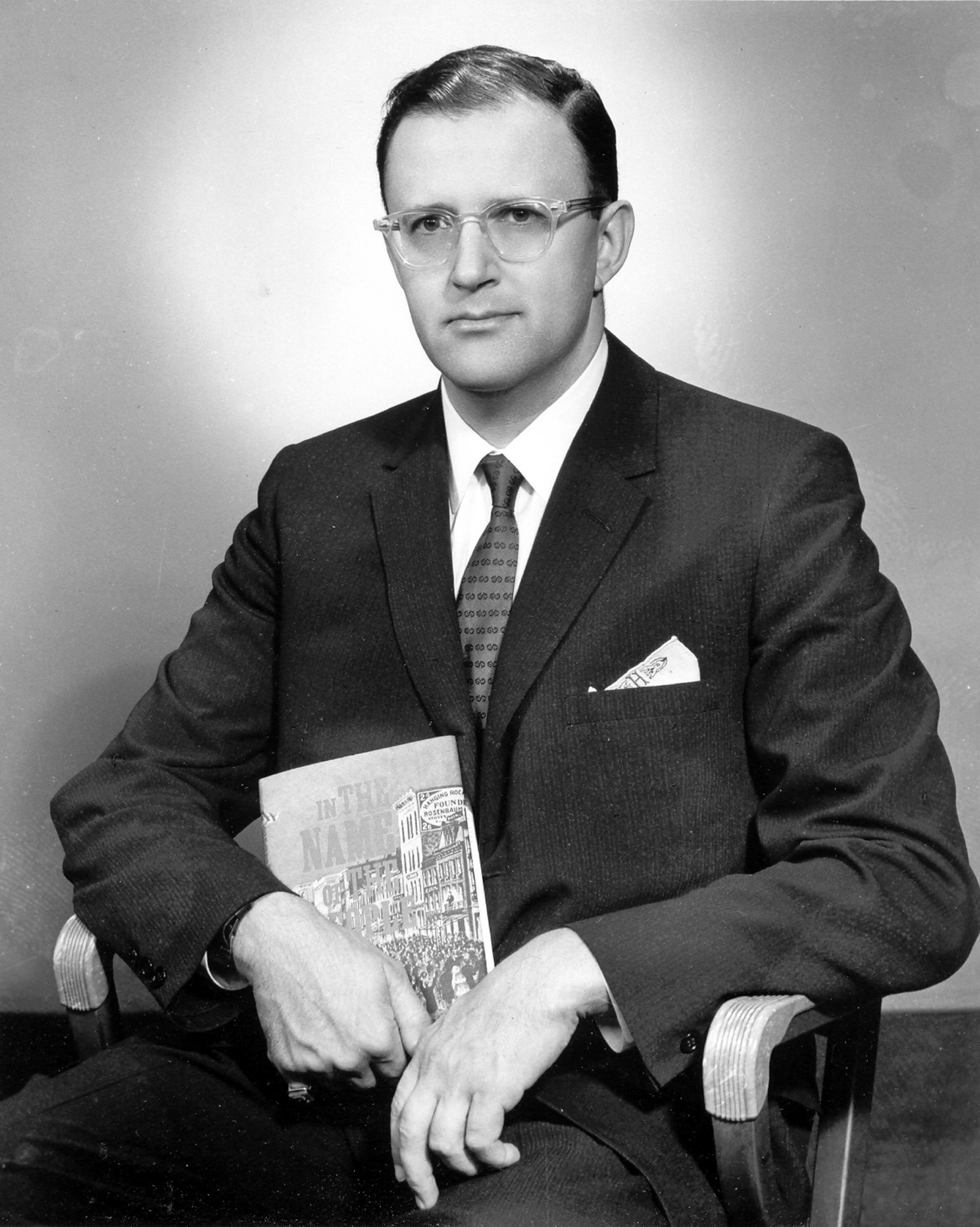
- Jaffa in 1958
- Born: Harry Victor Jaffa; October 7, 1918; New York City, U.S.
- Died: January 10, 2015 (aged 96); Pomona, California, U.S.
- Spouse: Marjorie Etta Butler (m. 1942; died 2010)

Academic background
- Education: Yale University (BA); The New School (PhD)
- Thesis: Thomism and Aristotelianism (1950)
- Doctoral advisor: Leo Strauss
- Influences: Walter Berns

Academic work
- Discipline: History; philosophy
- Sub-discipline: Political philosophy
- Institutions: Ohio State University; Claremont McKenna College; Claremont Graduate University; Claremont Institute
- Notable students: Peter W. Schramm; Michael Anton; Larry P. Arnn; Michael Uhlmann; Thomas G. West
- Notable works: Crisis of the House Divided (1959)

Harry Victor Jaffa (October 7, 1918 – January 10, 2015) was an American political philosopher, historian, columnist, and professor. He was a professor emeritus at Claremont McKenna College, Claremont Graduate University, and was a distinguished fellow of the Claremont Institute. Robert P. Kraynak says his "life work was to develop an American application of Leo Strauss's revival of natural-right philosophy against the relativism and nihilism of our times".

Jaffa wrote on topics ranging from Aristotle and Thomas Aquinas to Abraham Lincoln, Winston Churchill, and natural law. He was published in the Claremont Review of Books, the Review of Politics, National Review, and The New York Times. His most famous work, Crisis of the House Divided: An Interpretation of the Issues in the Lincoln-Douglas Debates (1959), has been described as a touchstone. He wrote the controversial line in 1964 Republican presidential nominee Barry Goldwater's acceptance speech that "extremism in the defense of liberty is no vice".

Jaffa was a formative influence on the American conservative movement, challenging notable conservative thinkers, including Russell Kirk, Richard M. Weaver, and Willmoore Kendall, on Abraham Lincoln and the founding of the United States. He debated Robert Bork on American constitutionalism. He died in 2015.

== Early life and education ==
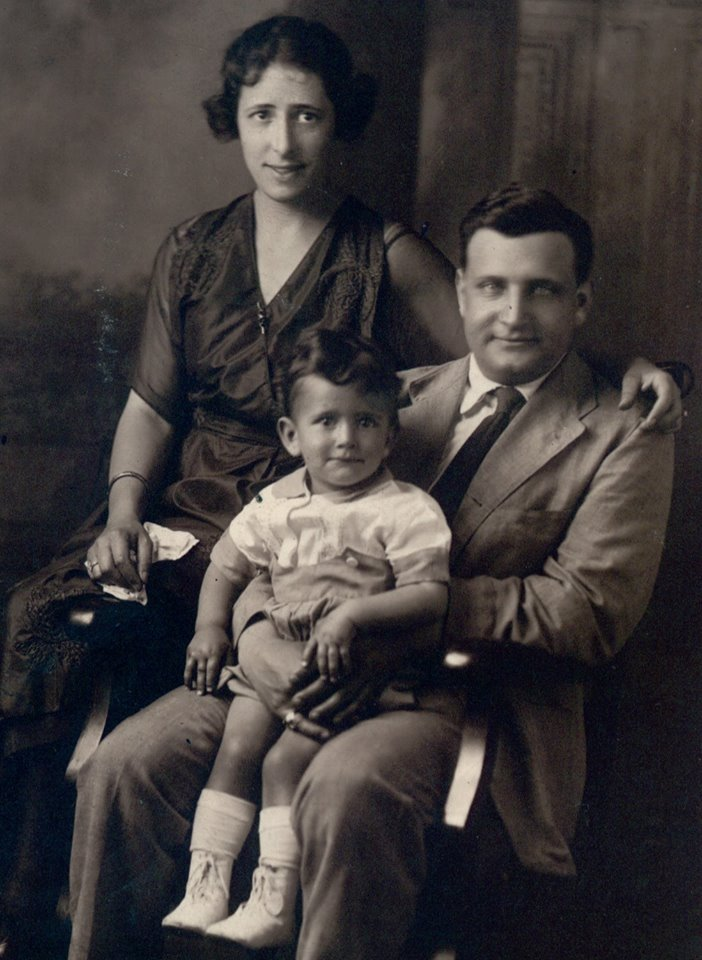
Jaffa as a child, with his parents in the early 1920s

Jaffa was born in New York City on October 7, 1918, to Arthur Solomon Jaffa and Frances Landau Jaffa; his middle name is a reference to World War I, which ended with the year he was born. His family was Jewish. He earned a Bachelor of Arts degree in English literature from Yale University and a Doctor of Philosophy (PhD) degree in political philosophy from The New School for Social Research. As a PhD student, he became interested in Abraham Lincoln after discovering a copy of the Lincoln–Douglas debates in a used bookshop.

Jaffa was one of Leo Strauss's first PhD students. His dissertation on Aristotle and Thomas Aquinas later became his first book, Thomism and Aristotelianism. In it, he argues that Aquinas's Christian beliefs influenced his work on Aristotle. Alasdair MacIntyre describes the book as "an unduly neglected minor modern classic".

== Career and views ==
Jaffa taught at Queens College, City College of New York, and the University of Chicago in the 1940s before receiving his doctorate. He taught at Ohio State University from 1951 through 1964, before moving to Claremont McKenna College.

Jaffa was known for his political involvement in addition to his writings. He was a "Kennedy Democrat who switched parties after the Bay of Pigs" in the 1960s, as described by Sam Tanenhaus. During the 1964 presidential election, Jaffa worked for the Republican campaign of Barry Goldwater. Jaffa wrote Goldwater's famous and controversial statement in his acceptance speech at the Republican National Convention: "I would remind you that extremism in the defense of liberty is no vice. And let me remind you also that moderation in the pursuit of justice is no virtue."

At Claremont, Jaffa was known as a leader of the "West Coast Straussians" and the "Claremonsters". His proteges can be found at Claremont and other colleges, including Hillsdale College and the University of Dallas. United States Supreme Court Justice Clarence Thomas has said Jaffa influenced his judicial views.

=== Founding of the United States ===
Jaffa believed the American founders, including Thomas Jefferson, James Madison, and George Washington, established the nation on political principles traceable from Locke to Aristotle. While he believed that governments are instituted to protect rights, he acknowledged the higher ends they serve, primarily happiness. The Declaration of Independence said, "whenever any form of government becomes destructive of these ends [life, liberty, and the pursuit of happiness], it is the right of the people to alter or abolish it, and to institute new government, laying its foundations on such principles and organizing its powers in such form, as to them shall seem most likely to effect their safety and happiness." Jaffa pointed out that safety and happiness are the principal virtues of Aristotelian political life in his Politics. Jaffa also pointed to Federalist No. 43, in which James Madison declares that safety and happiness are the aims of all political institutions, and that George Washington's first inaugural address cemented the link between human happiness and government and thereby shows the ancient roots of the American founding.

=== Abraham Lincoln scholarship ===
Jaffa wrote two books dealing exclusively with Abraham Lincoln. His first, Crisis of the House Divided: An Interpretation of the Issues in the Lincoln-Douglas Debates, was written in 1959. Forty years later, he followed it with A New Birth of Freedom: Abraham Lincoln and the Coming of the Civil War. Jaffa also wrote several essays on Lincoln for National Review and other journals. Before Jaffa, most conservative scholars, including M. E. Bradford, Russell Kirk, and Willmoore Kendall, believed that Lincoln's presidency represented a substantial growth in federal power and limitations on individual rights.

Jaffa also believed that the Declaration of Independence and the United States Constitution share a relationship whereby the latter is intended to preserve the principles of the former. This belief has garnered criticism from legal scholars, particularly Robert Bork.

==== Crisis of the House Divided ====
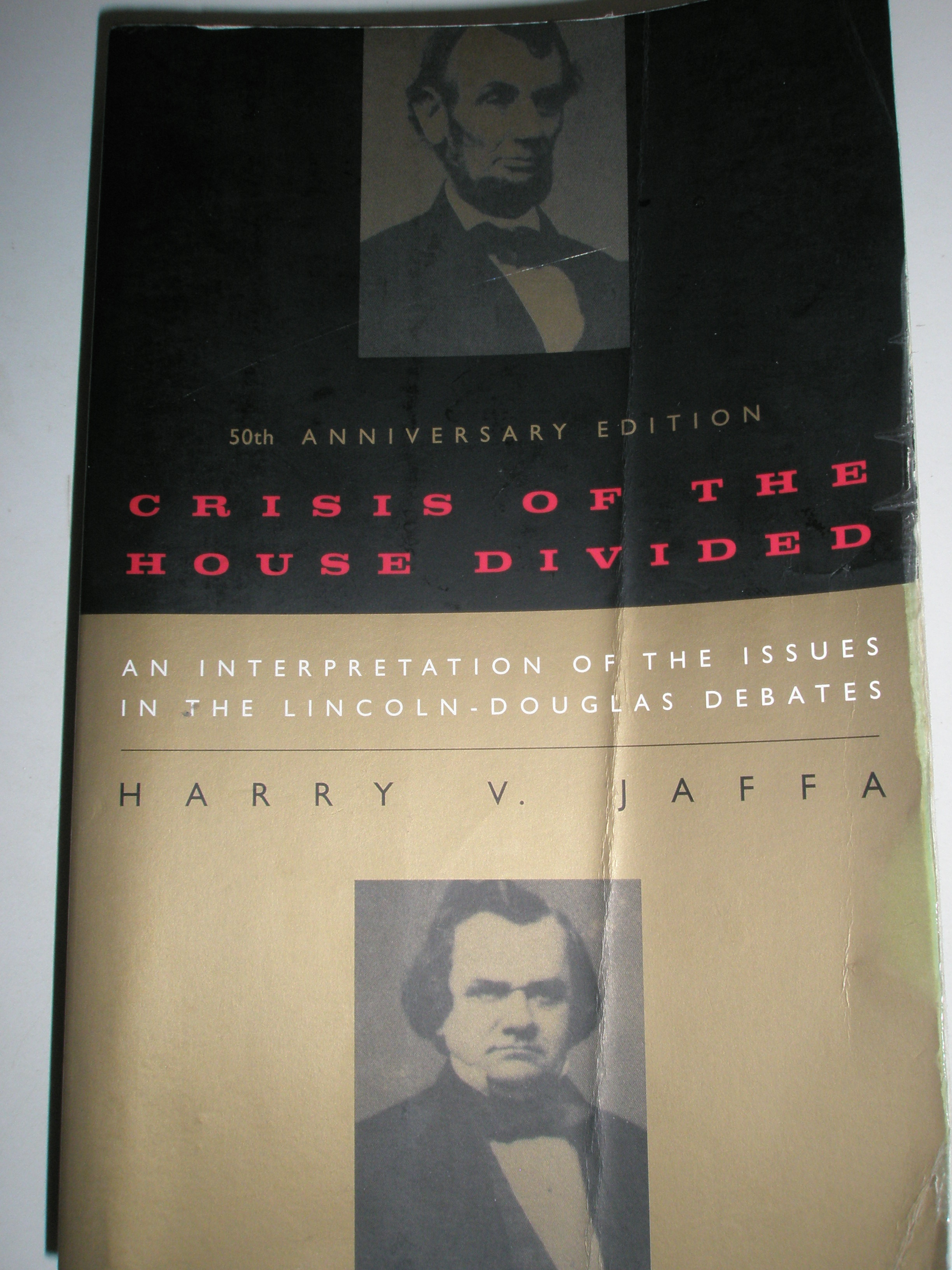
Crisis of the House Divided, by Harry V. Jaffa

In Crisis of the House Divided, Jaffa discusses the Lincoln–Douglas debates that occurred on the eve of the American Civil War. During the 1850s, concern over the spread of slavery into the territories and into the free states became the primary concern of American politics. Stephen A. Douglas proposed the doctrine of popular sovereignty, which removed congressional authority over the expansion of slavery into the territories and allowed the citizens of each territory to decide whether slavery would be legal there. In contrast, Lincoln believed that popular sovereignty was another example of the tyranny of the majority. Lincoln argued that a majority could not sanction the enslavement of other men due to the Founding principle that "All men are created equal," which slavery violated. Both men squared off in a contest for Illinois' Senate seat in 1858.

In the book, Jaffa explains the philosophical underpinnings of both Lincoln's and Douglas's arguments. According to Catherine H. Zuckert, Jaffa "aimed at nothing less than bringing to bear on America the methods and substance of the Straussian revival of the Socratic tradition of political philosophy." Like Strauss, Jaffa observed the tendency of modernity to degenerate moral and political philosophy, which he found in Douglas' appeal to popular sovereignty. Jaffa also believed that Lincoln challenged Douglas' argument with an Aristotelian or classical philosophical position derived from the Declaration of Independence and its contention that "all men are created equal." In The New Yorker, Sam Tanenhaus described the book as "a touchstone in the vast Lincoln literature" and wrote that "Lincoln emerges from it as a serious moral philosopher".

==== A New Birth of Freedom ====
A New Birth of Freedom was to be the first of a projected two-volume commentary on the Gettysburg Address. The first volume focuses on Lincoln's First Inaugural Address and his July 4, 1861, address to Congress. Jaffa argues that the Gettysburg Address is not a self-contained work but "a speech within a drama. It can no more be interpreted apart from the drama than, let us say, a speech by Hamlet or MacBeth can be interpreted apart from Hamlet or MacBeth. The Gettysburg Address is a speech within the tragedy of the Civil War, even as Lincoln is its tragic hero. The Civil War is itself an outcome of tragic flaws—birthmarks, so to speak—of the infant nation."

Jaffa describes human equality as America's "ancient faith" and contends that the Declaration of Independence reflects the principles of natural law. According to Jaffa, Lincoln's task was to restore America's political faith, saving the Union from the historicism of the Confederacy. Jaffa considers the political philosophy of John C. Calhoun to be the backbone of the Confederacy's new constitution and of its notion of human inequality. According to him, Calhoun believed that equality was only a prescriptive attribute of the states, not a natural right of human persons. By extension, Calhoun believes that human equality is derived from the relationship between equal states and not equal persons. Jaffa, therefore, believes that Calhoun's understanding of equality differs greatly from the American founders.

=== Debating Lincoln ===
Jaffa debated many conservative and libertarian critics of Abraham Lincoln. In the mid-1960s, he argued for Lincoln's conservative legacy in the pages of National Review with Frank Meyer, who maintained that Lincoln opened the door to unlimited expansion of federal power. In his book, Storm Over the Constitution (1999), he formulated a theory of constitutional law that incorporates the Declaration of Independence. The theory was criticized for being overly philosophical, rather than legal, despite being presented as a legal argument. His approach was especially critical of figures such as William Rehnquist and Robert Bork, who responded to Jaffa in National Review.

Jaffa also criticized the scholarship of other prominent conservatives including Russell Kirk, Richard Weaver, M.E. Bradford, and Willmoore Kendall. He debated libertarian Lincoln critic Thomas DiLorenzo in 2002.

=== Criticism of Robert Bork ===
Jaffa argued that former Supreme Court nominee Robert Bork advanced a theory of American constitutionalism that was in fundamental tension with the principles of the Declaration of Independence, and that was insufficiently conservative. Jaffa argued that Bork's argument represented legal positivism and moral relativism akin to that expressed by John C. Calhoun and the Confederacy during the Civil War. According to Jaffa, Bork believed that the Constitution and the Declaration were separate documents, never intended to inform one another. Bork argued that the Constitution said nothing about abortion or gay rights. Jaffa believed that the Constitution followed natural law principles, and therefore prohibited states from protecting abortion or homosexuality. Bork replied that Jaffa's theories amounted to "the heart's desire theory of constitutional jurisprudence: Anything one does not like is in the Constitution", and that those who agreed with him "had much in common with Harry Blackmun, although neither would care to admit it."

=== National Review ===
Jaffa was close friends with William F. Buckley, publishing numerous articles on Lincoln in National Review throughout Jaffa's career. He credited Buckley with allowing him to publish when he had been blacklisted by liberal journals and neoconservative publications after a dispute with Irving Kristol. However, Jaffa disagreed with many of the writers then publishing for the magazine, including Russell Kirk and Frank Meyer. According to him, these men and other writers there rejected the principles of the Declaration of Independence and its main contention that "all men are created equal." Jaffa spent his lifetime stressing the importance of the Declaration to conservatives and liberals alike.

=== Barry Goldwater campaign ===
During the 1964 presidential campaign, Jaffa, who was serving as a speechwriter to Republican candidate Barry Goldwater, penned the line, "Extremism in the defense of liberty is no vice, and moderation in the pursuit of justice is not a virtue" in his acceptance speech for the Republican presidential nomination. Although Goldwater claimed repeatedly that the line originated in a speech by Cicero, it appears nowhere in Cicero's works, and was in fact authored by Jaffa.

== Death ==
Jaffa died at Pomona Valley Hospital on January 10, 2015, the same day as his fellow Straussian and rival Walter Berns.

== Personal life ==
Jaffa married Marjorie Butler in 1942; she died in 2010. They had three children, Donald, Philip, and Karen.

== Bibliography ==
=== Books ===
- Thomism and Aristotelianism: A Study of the Commentary by Thomas Aquinas on the Nicomachean Ethics (Chicago: University of Chicago Press, 1952).
- Crisis of the House Divided: An Interpretation of the Issues in the Lincoln-Douglas Debates, (Chicago: University of Chicago Press, 1959).
- Johannsen, Robert W. (1959). In the Name of the People: Speeches and Writings of Lincoln and Douglas in the Ohio Campaign of 1859. Ohio State University Press.
- How to Think about the American Revolution: A Bicentennial Cerebration (Carolina Academic Press, 1978).
- Original Intent & the Framers of the Constitution, (Washington, D.C.: Regnery Publishing, Inc., 1994).
- Shakespeare's Politics, ed. by Harry V. Jaffa and Allan Bloom (Chicago: University of Chicago Press, 1996).
- Storm Over the Constitution, (Lanham: Lexington Books, 1999).
- A New Birth of Freedom, (Lanham: Rowman & Littlefield Publishers, Inc., 2000).
- The Rediscovery of America: Essays by Harry V. Jaffa on the New Birth of Politics (Rowman & Littlefield, 2019)

=== Articles ===
- "The Ends of History Means the End of Freedom" January 17, 1990.
- "Clarifying Homosexuality and Natural Law" January 1, 1991.
- "A Review of Richard Mohr's Book" February 1, 1991.
- "A Reply to Philip Dynia" August 19, 1993.
- "Defending the Cause of Human Freedom" April 15, 1994.
- "Defending the Cause of Human Freedom" April 15, 1994.
- "The Party of Lincoln vs. The Party of Bureaucrats" September 13, 1996.
- "How Lincoln Foresaw the End of Slavery" January 29, 1998.
- "Leo Strauss, the Bible, and Political Philosophy" February 13, 1998.
- "The False Prophets of American Conservatism" February 12, 1998.
- "The Deepening Crisis" February 9, 1999.
- "Why Special Interests and the Constitution are Good For You" February 20, 2000.
- "Thoughts on Lincoln's Birthday" January 22, 2001.
- "Campaign Reform is Unconstitutional No Matter What McCain May Claim" February 1, 2001.
- "Aristotle and Locke in the American Founding" February 10, 2001.
- "American Conservatism and the Present Crisis" February 12, 2003.
- "Strauss at 100" May 14, 2003.
- "Can There Be Another Winston Churchill?" February 6, 2004.
- "Never Before In History", July 2, 2004.
- "Ignoble Liars and Noble Truth-Tellers", August 17, 2004.
- "Wages of Sin", October 11, 2004.
- "The Logic of the Colorblind Constitution", December 6, 2004.
- "Jaffa on Intelligent Design", January 3, 2006.
- "The Disputed Question", January 9, 2007.
- "The American Founding as the Best Regime", July 4, 2007.
- "Macbeth and the Moral Universe", February 19, 2008.
- "The Soul of Buckley", April 4, 2008.
- "God Bless America, "Claremont Review of Books", Spring 2008.
- "The Speech That Changed the World", February 6, 2009.
- "Lincoln In Peoria", Fall 2009.
- "Aristotle and the Higher Good" July 1, 2011.
