= Synempora andesae =

Scientific classification
- Kingdom: Animalia
- Phylum: Arthropoda
- Class: Insecta
- Order: Lepidoptera
- Family: Neopseustidae
- Genus: Synempora
- Species: S. andesae

Binomial name
- Synempora andesae Davis & Nielsen, 1980

Species of archaic bell moth

Synempora andesae is a species of moth belonging to the family Neopseustidae. It was described by Donald R. Davis & Ebbe Nielsen in 1980. It is known from Argentina and Chile.
