= Willmoore Kendall =

American conservative writer

- Willmoore Kendall during his years at the University of Dallas
- Born: Willmoore Bohnert Kendall Jr. March 5, 1909; Konawa, Oklahoma, U.S.
- Died: June 30, 1967 (aged 58); Irving, Texas, U.S.
- Education: University of Oklahoma (BA); University of Illinois (MA, PhD); Pembroke College, Oxford (MPhil)
- Occupation: Political philosopher
- Known for: Founding National Review, Conservative advocacy
- Spouse: Katherine Tuach (m. 1935; div. 1951) Anne Brunsdale (m. 1952; div. 1956) Nellie Cooper (m. 1966)

Willmoore Bohnert Kendall Jr. (March 5, 1909 – June 30, 1967) was an American conservative writer and a professor of political philosophy.

== Early life and education ==
Kendall was born March 5, 1909, in Konawa, Oklahoma. His father, who was blind, was a Southern Methodist minister who preached in Konawa and other local towns. At age two, Kendall learned to read by playing with a typewriter. Graduating from high school at age 13, Kendall enrolled at Northwestern University before transferring to the University of Tulsa. In 1927, Kendall graduated from the University of Oklahoma at age 18. In 1927, under the pseudonym Alan Monk, Kendall wrote his first book, Baseball: How to Play It and How to Watch It. He later became a prep school teacher.

After graduate-level studies in Romance languages at the University of Illinois Urbana-Champaign, Kendall became a Rhodes scholar in 1932, enrolling in the philosophy, politics and economics program at Pembroke College, Oxford. Among his professors at Oxford was R. G. Collingwood. Associates remembered Kendall as "argumentative" and passionate about debate. At Oxford, Kendall completed a Bachelor of Arts degree in 1935 and Master of Arts degree in 1938.

A liberal while studying at Oxford, Kendall strongly supported the Second Spanish Republic during the Spanish Civil War and opposed Joseph Stalin. In 1935, Kendall left Oxford to become a reporter for the United Press in Madrid. Witnessing the Spanish Civil War caused a shift in his political views towards anti-communism.

Kendall returned to the University of Illinois in 1936. With Francis Wilson as his dissertation adviser, Kendall completed his Ph.D. in political science at Illinois in 1940. His dissertation was titled John Locke and the Doctrine of Majority-Rule.

== Career ==
Around 1939, Kendall began his academic career as an assistant professor of political science, teaching at Louisiana State University, Hobart College, and the University of Richmond. Kendall left academia in 1942 to work for the federal government in World War II. Primarily working in government operations, Kendall worked for the Office of the Coordinator of Inter-American Affairs in Washington, D. C. and Bogotá. After a brief period as chief of Latin American research for the State Department intelligence office, Kendall joined the new Office of Research and Evaluation in the Central Intelligence Group, a predecessor to the modern Central Intelligence Agency, in a similar role heading the Latin American Branch.

Kendall joined the Yale University faculty in 1947, where he taught for 14 years until being paid a severance package of over $10,000. In 1961, he surrendered tenure and departed. Among his students was William F. Buckley, Jr. with whom he participated in the founding of National Review; as a senior editor, he constantly fought with the other editors (it is said that he was never on speaking terms with more than one person at a time). Another student whom Kendall strongly influenced at Yale was L. Brent Bozell Jr. Kendall also influenced Buckley's ideas in the National Review because he explained that liberals were a small minority group in the community. A friend, Professor Revilo P. Oliver, gave him credit with convincing him to enter political activism by writing for National Review. After Yale, Kendall lived in Spain and France for a time, and briefly taught at several universities in a non-tenured role.

In 1963, Kendall was recruited by Louise Cowan to join the University of Dallas, founding and chairing the Department of Politics and Economics at the University of Dallas. He stayed at that institution until he died in 1967.

== Philosophy ==
In the 1930s, Kendall held left-wing views, for instance supporting the proposed Ludlow Amendment that would require a national popular vote for entering a war. His 1940 Ph.D. dissertation provided a unique view of John Locke. Kendall saw him more as a proto-democrat who would approve of societies governed by majority rule, rather than an individualist who wished for an aloof government as was the more common consensus view.

Combined with his anti-Communism and anti-interventionism, the two years immediately preceding World War II influenced Kendall to move right politically. Kendall voted for Republican challenger Wendell Willkie against Democrat and incumbent President Franklin D. Roosevelt in the 1940 presidential election; in a letter to a friend shortly after the 1946 midterm elections where Republicans made gains in Congress, Kendall expressed hope of "a Congress really asserting its prerogatives" against the executive branch. Then in 1952, after supporting Robert A. Taft in the Republican primaries, Kendall voted for Republican candidate Dwight D. Eisenhower.

Kendall defended majority-rule democracy in America. He felt that majoritarianism should come before liberalism (in the political philosophy sense of liberal democracy) and that the government should not undercut the social consensus by attempting to enforce abstract rights. On those grounds, he supported racial segregation, for example, if the society of Southern states found that acceptable to their consensus, they should be allowed to impose it. Civil rights agitators were disrupting the social consensus and group morality.

After long being skeptical of religion, Kendall converted to Roman Catholicism in 1952, with Buckley as his godfather, in part due to the church's centuries-old traditions and opposition to Communism.

Additionally, in his 1963 book The Conservative Affirmation and various articles, Kendall opposed open society and moral relativism, particularly the philosophy of John Stuart Mill. According to Kendall, "any viable society has an orthodoxy—a set of fundamental beliefs, implicit in its way of life, that it cannot and should not and, in any case, will not submit to the vicissitudes of the market place." Criticizing Mill, Kendall wrote: "The all-questions-are-open-questions society...cannot...practice tolerance towards those who disagree with it."

On economics, Kendall was heavily influenced by the thought of John Maynard Keynes while studying at Oxford and consequently was not a full adherent of capitalism; Kendall was also critical of what he called "the bureaucratization of business enterprise" and "rise of the meritocracy."

Regarding the "all men are created equal" clause of the Declaration of Independence, Kendall interpreted "equal" to refer to equality before the law rather than liberal egalitarianism in a socioeconomic sense.

== Personal life and death ==
Kendall's first two marriages were annulled. His first marriage to Katherine Tuach began in 1935 and ended in divorce in 1951. His second marriage was to Anne Brunsdale, an employee he had supervised at the Central Intelligence Group and niece of North Dakota Governor Norman Brunsdale; it began in 1952 and ended in divorce in 1956. His third marriage, to Nellie Cooper, began in 1966.

He died of a heart attack at home on June 30, 1967.

== Legacy ==
He is often forgotten as a founder of the conservative movement because he never wrote a "big book," rather he put together a collection of reviews and essays.

Kendall is the model for the character Jesse Frank in Sidney Zion's 1990 novel Markers.

== Bibliography ==
=== Books by Kendall ===
- Baseball: How to Play It and How to Watch It (1927, as Alan Monk), Haldeman-Julius Publications.
- Democracy and the American Party System (1956 with Austin Ranney), Harcourt, Brace.
- John Locke and the Doctrine of Majority-Rule (1959), The University of Illinois Press. Full text
- The Conservative Affirmation (1963) (republished in 1985 by Regnery Books).
- Willmoore Kendall Contra Mundum (1971, edited by Nellie Kendall), Arlington House (republished in 1994 by University Press of America, ISBN 0-8191-9067-5).
- The Basic Symbols of the American Political Tradition (1970, with George W. Carey), Louisiana State University Press (republished in 1995 by Catholic University of America Press. ISBN 0-8132-0826-2).
- Oxford Years: Letters of Willmore Kendall to His Father (1993, edited by Yvonna Kendall Mason), ISI Books. ISBN 1-882926-02-1

=== About Kendall ===
- Willmoore Kendall: Maverick of American Conservatives, Alvis, John, and Murley, John, eds. Lexington Books. (Review.)
