= Nematocentropus schmidi =

Scientific classification
- Kingdom: Animalia
- Phylum: Arthropoda
- Class: Insecta
- Order: Lepidoptera
- Family: Neopseustidae
- Genus: Nematocentropus
- Species: N. schmidi

Binomial name
- Nematocentropus schmidi (Mutuura, 1971)

Synonyms
- Archepiolus schmidi Mutuura, 1971

Species of archaic bell moth

Nematocentropus schmidi is a species of moth belonging to the family Neopseustidae. It was described by Akira Mutuura in 1971. It is known only from the type-locality located southwest of the town of Rupa near the border of Bhutan in Assam, India.

The wingspan is about 16 mm. The specimen was found near a mountain stream on a heavily forested site at an elevation of approximately 2,154 meters.
