= Synempora =

Scientific classification
- Kingdom: Animalia
- Phylum: Arthropoda
- Clade: Pancrustacea
- Class: Insecta
- Order: Lepidoptera
- Family: Neopseustidae
- Genus: Synempora; Davis & Nielsen, 1980

Species
- See text.

Archaic bell moth genus

Synempora is a genus of moths in the family Neopseustidae.

== Species ==
- Synempora andesae Davis & Nielsen, 1980
