= Matías Taccetta =

Argentine politician

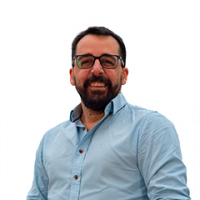

Mayor of Esquel
- Incumbent
- Assumed office 10 December 2023
- Preceded by: Sergio Ongarato

National Deputy
- In office 16 December 2021 – 10 December 2023
- Constituency: Chubut

Personal details
- Born: 17 September 1977 (age 48)
- Party: Republican Proposal
- Occupation: Accountant

Matías Federico Taccetta (born 17 September 1977) is an Argentine politician. A member of Republican Proposal (PRO), he was a member of the Chamber of Deputies elected in Chubut Province from 2021 to 2023. In 2023 he was elected intendente (mayor) of Esquel.

== Biography ==
Taccetta was an accountant before he was elected.
