= Apoplania =

Scientific classification
- Kingdom: Animalia
- Phylum: Arthropoda
- Clade: Pancrustacea
- Class: Insecta
- Order: Lepidoptera
- Family: Neopseustidae
- Genus: Apoplania; Davis, 1975

Species
- see text.

Archaic bell moth genus

Apoplania is a genus of moths in the family Neopseustidae.

== Species ==
- Apoplania chilensis D.R. Davis, 1975
- Apoplania penai Davis & Nielsen, 1980
- Apoplania valdiviana Davis & Nielsen, 1985
