= Walter Berns =

American political theorist (1919–2015)

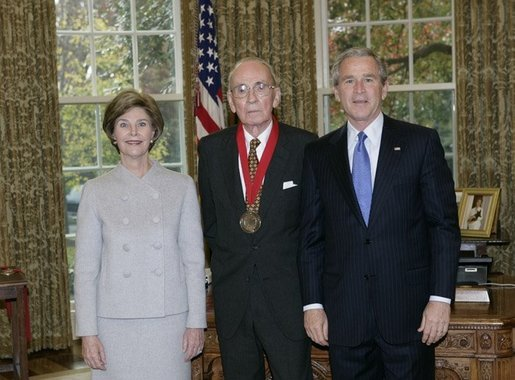
- Walter Berns (center) received a 2005 National Humanities Medal from President George W. Bush and First Lady Laura Bush.
- Born: Walter Fred Berns Jr. May 3, 1919; Chicago, Illinois, U.S.
- Died: January 10, 2015 (aged 95); Bethesda, Maryland, U.S.
- Education: Reed College; University of Chicago
- Occupation: Political philosopher
- Spouse: Irene Lyons

Walter Fred Berns Jr. (May 3, 1919 – January 10, 2015) was an American constitutional law and political philosophy professor. He was a resident scholar at the American Enterprise Institute and a professor emeritus at Georgetown University.

== Early life and career ==
Berns was raised in Chicago, where, as late as 1926, he was impressed by "Union soldiers in the [Memorial Day] parade feebly carrying the standard." He attended Reed College and the General Course at the London School of Economics and Political Science, "where [he] learned little, other than to love London," and received his bachelor's degree from the University of Iowa. World War II intervened, and "there was no question but that [he] would serve in WW II." He served in the US Navy from 1941 to 1945. After the war, he lived and worked as a waiter in Taos, New Mexico, where he befriended Frieda Lawrence. Since she persuaded him that he did not have a future as a writer, Berns returned to academia. He studied for his Ph.D. under Leo Strauss at the University of Chicago, where he also became lifelong friends with Herbert Storing. He taught political philosophy at Louisiana State University (1953–1956) and Yale University (1956–1959). In 1959, he joined the government department at Cornell University.

== Upheaval at Cornell ==
Berns taught at Cornell from 1959 to 1969 and chaired the Department of Government from 1963 to 1967. He was a popular professor and was "applauded after every lecture in their large courses, not merely after the last lecture of the semester, which was the normal student acknowledgment of a course well taught." Berns became friends with his faculty colleague Allan Bloom during these years. He was less than impressed by the attitudes of the faculty class at the time:

I recall a faculty party at Cornell, the day after the annual Fourth of July celebration at the university football stadium with fireworks. The wife of an economics professor, when asked if she had enjoyed the fireworks, replied, "Yes, but I could have done without all the flag-waving." This reminded me of that familiar old song—familiar in some circles, at least—"If you don't like my peaches, why do you shake my tree?"

Berns was an active participant in the debates leading up to the takeover of the Cornell student union by black separatist activists in 1969. Berns and Bloom were among a small cohort of professors who argued for the primacy of the liberal arts and for "academic freedom" to disagree with the changes and "new orthodoxy" spearheaded by University President James A. Perkins, such as the erosion of the core curriculum and the concessions to demands for a black-only college.

Berns was targeted by protesters for his role in the campus debate; in his radio broadcast after taking over the student union on April 19, 1969, Thomas W. Jones included Berns in a list of those opposing the protesters: "Walter Berns is a racist." Once the student union takeover had been settled in favor of the protesters and after he had receiving personal threats, Berns resigned from Cornell and took up a position at the University of Toronto.

== In Washington ==
Berns taught at Toronto until 1979, at which point he moved to Washington to teach at Georgetown and conduct constitutional law research at AEI. His research interests at AEI included the US Constitution, constitution-making, political philosophy, patriotism, the Founding, the death penalty, freedom of speech, the electoral college, and Abraham Lincoln.

Berns served on the Judicial Fellows Commission, the National Council on the Humanities, the board of directors of the Institute for Educational Affairs, the Joint Undertaking of the American Historical Association and American Political Science Association to Commemorate the Bicentennial of the U.S. Constitution, and the Council of Scholars of the Library of Congress.

== Later life ==
Berns married Irene Lyons Berns in 1951; they lived in Chevy Chase, Maryland. In 2005, Berns received the National Humanities Medal from President George W. Bush. He was an Episcopalian. Berns died of respiratory failure in Bethesda, Maryland, on January 10, 2015, aged 95, on the same day as his fellow Straussian rival Harry V. Jaffa.

== Bibliography ==
External videos
- Booknotes interview with Berns on Making Patriots, August 19, 2001, C-SPAN

- — (2006). Democracy and the constitution (PDF). Washington, DC: AEI Press. ISBN 978-0-8447-4239-7.
- — (October 15, 2002). Making patriots. University of Chicago Press. ISBN 978-0-226-04438-5. Publisher's webpage
- —, ed. (1992). After the people vote: A guide to the electoral college (2nd ed.). Washington, DC: AEI Press. ISBN 0-8447-3802-6.
- — (1991). Taking the constitution seriously. Lanham, Maryland: Madison Books. ISBN 978-0-8191-7970-8.
- — (1985). The first amendment and the future of american democracy. Chicago: Regnery Gateway. ISBN 978-0-89526-820-4.
- — (1984). In defense of liberal democracy (PDF). Lake Bluff, Illinois: Regnery Gateway. ISBN 978-0-89526-831-0. OCLC 11089943.
- —, ed. (1983). After the people vote: Steps in choosing the president (1st ed.). Washington, DC: AEI Press. ISBN 978-0-8447-3540-5. OCLC 9828420.
- — (June 7, 1979). For capital punishment: Crime and the morality of the death penalty. New York: Basic Books. ISBN 978-0-465-02473-5.
- — (1957). Freedom, virtue & the first amendment. Louisiana State University Press. OCLC 832953.
