= Separability problem =

The separability problem is a concept from the field of social choice theory that describes the situation where two or more issues up for vote on a ballot either are, or are perceived as, related.

The separability problem commonly manifests itself most intensely in referendums and in voting on multiple charges before juries or panels of judges, where simultaneous voting is employed. Some or all voters view the approval or disapproval of one issue dependent on the approval or disapproval of another. The voters have no information on the outcome of related issues, so they simply cast their first preference votes. The outcomes of these decision-making polls are often displeasing to a majority of voters merely because simultaneous voting denied them the information on outcomes of individual issues or the opportunity to express preferences of outcomes of related issues.

The solution to the separability problem for referendums would be set-wise voting, where the voter can express preferences for outcomes of related issues, as this process needs to be done at a particular time. For matters before juries or judicial panels, either set-wise or sequential voting can be employed to mitigate this problem, as all votes need not be cast in one instance. If sequential voting were employed, the outcome of every vote tally on an issue would be announced before a vote on the next issue would be taken. The drawback to sequential voting in this case would be that there is no means to guarantee that a juror would actually change a successive vote based on a prior verdict.
