= Nematocentropus =

Scientific classification
- Kingdom: Animalia
- Phylum: Arthropoda
- Clade: Pancrustacea
- Class: Insecta
- Order: Lepidoptera
- Family: Neopseustidae
- Genus: Nematocentropus; Hwang, 1965

Species
- see text.

Synonyms
- Archepiolus Mutuura, 1971

Archaic bell moth genus

Nematocentropus is a genus of moths in the family Neopseustidae.

== Species ==
- Nematocentropus omeiensis Hwang, 1965
- Nematocentropus schmidi (Mutuura, 1971)
