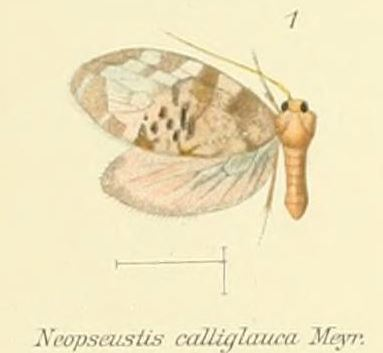
- Neopseustis calliglauca

Scientific classification
- Kingdom: Animalia
- Phylum: Arthropoda
- Clade: Pancrustacea
- Class: Insecta
- Order: Lepidoptera
- Family: Neopseustidae
- Genus: Neopseustis; Meyrick, 1909

Species
- see text.

Synonyms
- Formopseustis Matsumura, 1931; Neopseustie [sic] Meyrick, 1909; Nepseustis [sic] Kristensen, 1968

= Neopseustis =

Archaic bell moth genus

Neopseustis is a genus of moths in the family Neopseustidae.

== Species ==
- Neopseustis archiphenax Meyrick, 1928
- Neopseustis bicornuta D.R. Davis, 1975
- Neopseustis calliglauca Meyrick, 1909
- Neopseustis fanjingshana Yang, 1988
- Neopseustis meyricki Hering, 1925
- Neopseustis moxiensis Chen & Owada, 2009
- Neopseustis sinensis D.R. Davis, 1975
