= War referendum =

Hypothetical referendum on whether to wage a war

A war referendum is a proposed type of referendum in which citizens would decide whether a nation should go to war. No such referendum has ever taken place. The earliest idea of a war referendum came from the Marquis de Condorcet in 1793 and Immanuel Kant in 1795.

== See also ==
- Direct democracy
- Ludlow Amendment
