= Ludlow Amendment =

Proposed amendment to the US Constitution

The Ludlow Amendment was a proposed amendment to the Constitution of the United States which called for a national referendum on any declaration of war by Congress, except in cases when the United States had been attacked first. Representative Louis Ludlow (D-IN) introduced the amendment several times between 1935 and 1940. Supporters argued that ordinary people, who were called upon to fight and die during wartime, should have a direct vote on their country's involvement in military conflicts.

== Background ==
=== History of concept ===
The idea of a national referendum on any declaration of war was first suggested in 1914, and was supported by such notable politicians as three-time Democratic presidential candidate William Jennings Bryan and United States Senators Robert M. La Follette, Sr. and Thomas P. Gore. In the 1924 election campaign, both the Democratic and Progressive party platforms endorsed the idea of a popular vote on war, "except in case of actual attack" (Democrats) or "except in case of actual invasion" (Progressives).

=== Public support and opposition ===
Public support for the amendment was very robust through the 1930s, a period when isolationism was the prevailing mood in the United States, but began to erode as the situation in Europe deteriorated at the end of the decade. A Gallup survey in September 1935 showed that 75% of Americans supported the amendment; the approval rate was 71% in 1936, and 73% in 1937. In January 1938, when it was voted on in Congress, 68% of the US population still supported the amendment. But by March 1939, support had dropped to 61%; and six months later, following the German invasion of Poland, support for the amendment dropped to 51%. In addition, Good Housekeeping magazine, the National Council for Prevention of War, and Roger Nash Baldwin, president of the ACLU, endorsed the amendment.

Others also opposed the amendment. Michigan Senator Arthur H. Vandenberg, who was normally an isolationist, argued that the amendment "would be as sensible to require a town meeting before permitting the fire department to face a blaze". Author Walter Lippmann argued that the amendment would make "preventive diplomacy" impossible and would ensure "that finally, when the provocation has become intolerable, there would be no remedy except total war fought when we were at the greatest possible disadvantage." Protestant theologian Reinhold Niebuhr opposed the amendment stating that war was a policy area where pure democracy was most pernicious.

== Panay incident and 1938 congressional vote ==
Congressional debate on the amendment was prompted by the December 12, 1937 bombing of the USS Panay by Japanese warplanes. The Panay, a gunboat, was anchored in the Yangtze River near Nanjing, China and flying the American flag. President Franklin D. Roosevelt discussed with his cabinet and the military high command the possibility of economic or military retaliation against Japan. Roosevelt drew back, however, when he realized that there was no public outcry for retaliation, and that, in fact, peace sentiment in the country had actually strengthened. "We should learn that it is about time for us to mind our own business," Texas Democrat Maury Maverick declared in the House of Representatives. Two days after the Panay was sunk, Congress took up the Ludlow amendment. The Roosevelt administration attempted to keep the bill in the House Judiciary Committee, where it had been buried since Ludlow introduced the amendment in 1935; but at the end of 1937 the amendment got enough congressional support, including the signatures of nearly half the Democrats in the House, for a House vote on a discharge petition designed to permit debate on the proposed amendment.

The amendment came closest to overcoming a discharge petition on January 10, 1938, when it was defeated in Congress by a vote of 209 to 188. The difference in votes may have been provided by Postmaster General James Farley, who Roosevelt asked to sway the votes of the Irish Congressmen who were isolationists. Despite Roosevelt's fears, this vote was far short of the two-thirds vote required by both houses of Congress (290 in the House) for later passage of a constitutional amendment.

Before the discharge petition vote, speaker of the House William B. Bankhead read a letter written by President Roosevelt:

I must frankly state that I consider that the proposed amendment would be impracticable in its application and incompatible with our representative form of government.

Our Government is conducted by the people through representatives of their own choosing. It was with singular unanimity that the founders of the Republic agreed upon such free and representative form of government as the only practical means of government by the people.

Such an amendment to the Constitution as that proposed would cripple any President in his conduct of our foreign relations, and it would encourage other nations to believe that they could violate American rights with impunity.

== Subsequent proposals ==
In his 1993 book War and Responsibility: Constitutional Lessons of Vietnam and its Aftermath, noted constitutional scholar John Hart Ely made a proposal that "[brought] back memories" of the Ludlow Amendment, writing that, when initiating military action, "even notice to the entire Congress is insufficient to satisfy the constitutional requirement: We the people are part of the process too."

== Text of proposed amendment ==
SEC. 1. Except in the event of an invasion of the United States or its Territorial possessions and attack upon its citizens residing therein, the authority of Congress to declare war shall not become effective until confirmed by a majority of all votes cast thereon in a nationwide referendum. Congress, when it deems a national crisis to exist, may by concurrent resolution refer the question of war or peace to the citizens of the States, the question to be voted on being, Shall the United States declare war on ________? Congress may otherwise by law provide for the enforcement of this section.

SEC. 2. Whenever war is declared the President shall immediately conscript and take for use by the Government all the public and private war properties, yards, factories, and supplies, together with employees necessary for their operation, fixing the compensation for private properties temporarily employed for the war period at a rate not in excess of 4 percent based on tax values assessed in the year preceding the war.

== See also ==
- Amendments to the United States Constitution
- Nye Committee
- War referendum
