= Mining referendum =

A mining referendum is a direct and universal vote in which an entire electorate is invited to vote on a mining proposal. Mining referendums have been held in Tambo Grande, Peru in 2002, Esquel, Argentina in 2003, and Cuenca, Ecuador in 2021. In each of the three cases the local community rejected the establishment of new mines in their territory.

The first Colombian referendum or consulta popular ("popular consultation") took place in Cajamarca in 2017. 98% of electors voted against allowing mining in the town.

In 2022 activists in Quito, Ecuador gathered 380,000 signatures to petition a mining referendum to block a mining project in the forests of Chocó Andino.
