= Esquel, Argentina =

Esquel
- Town
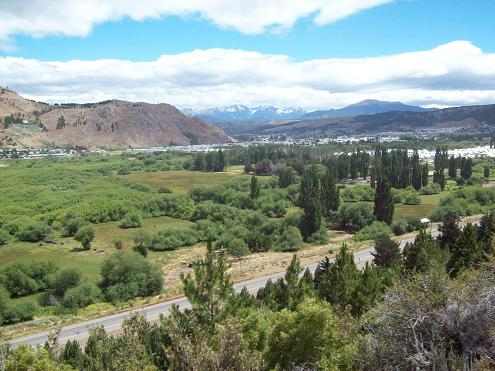
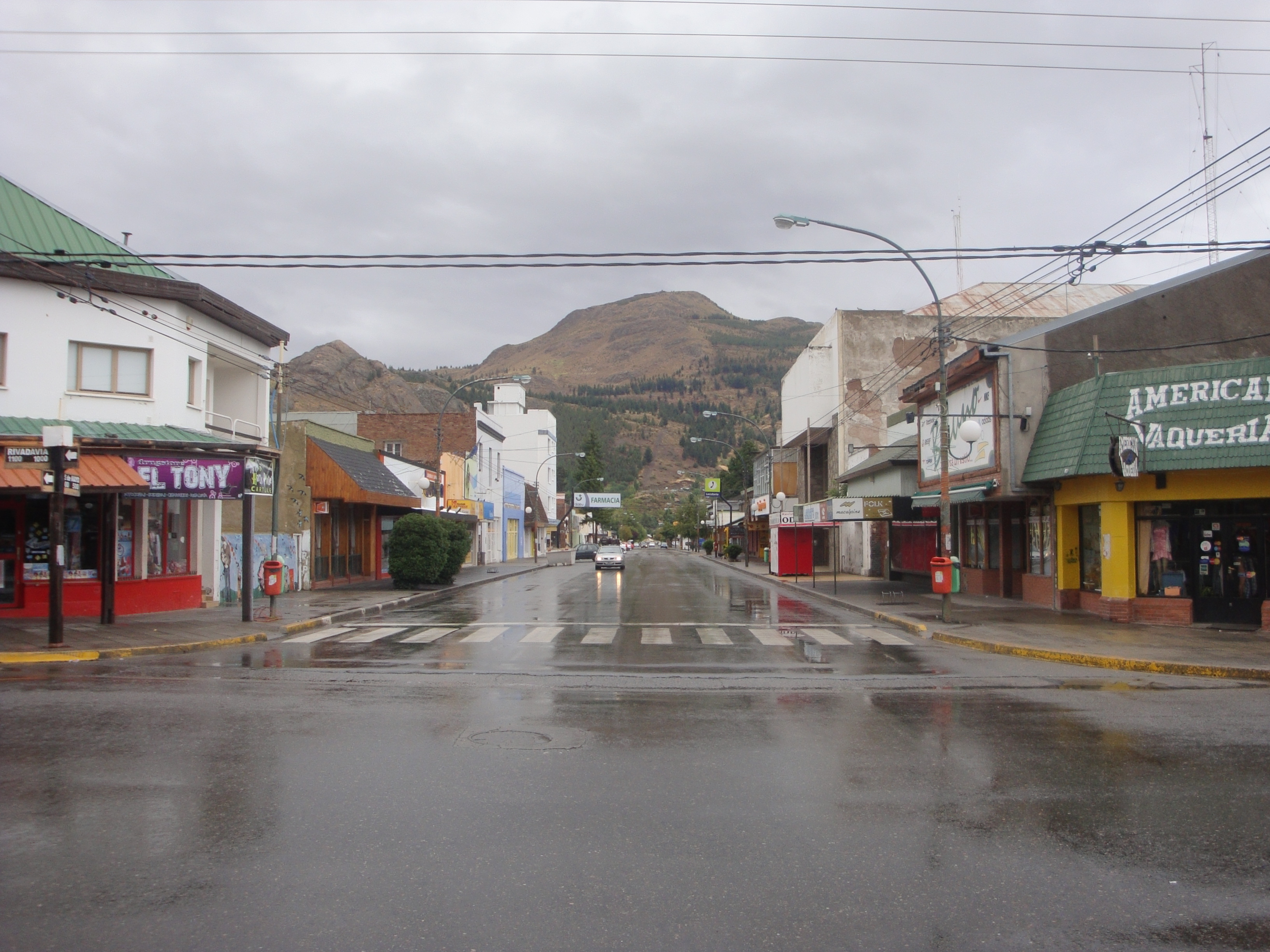
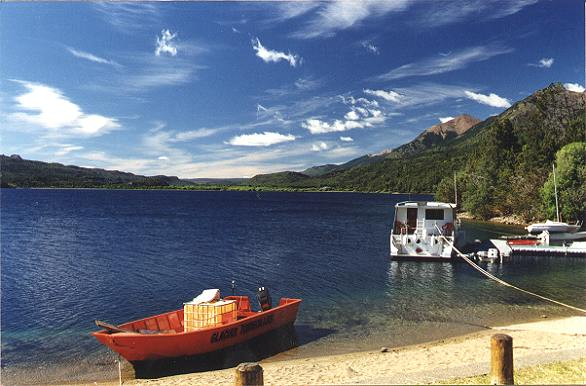
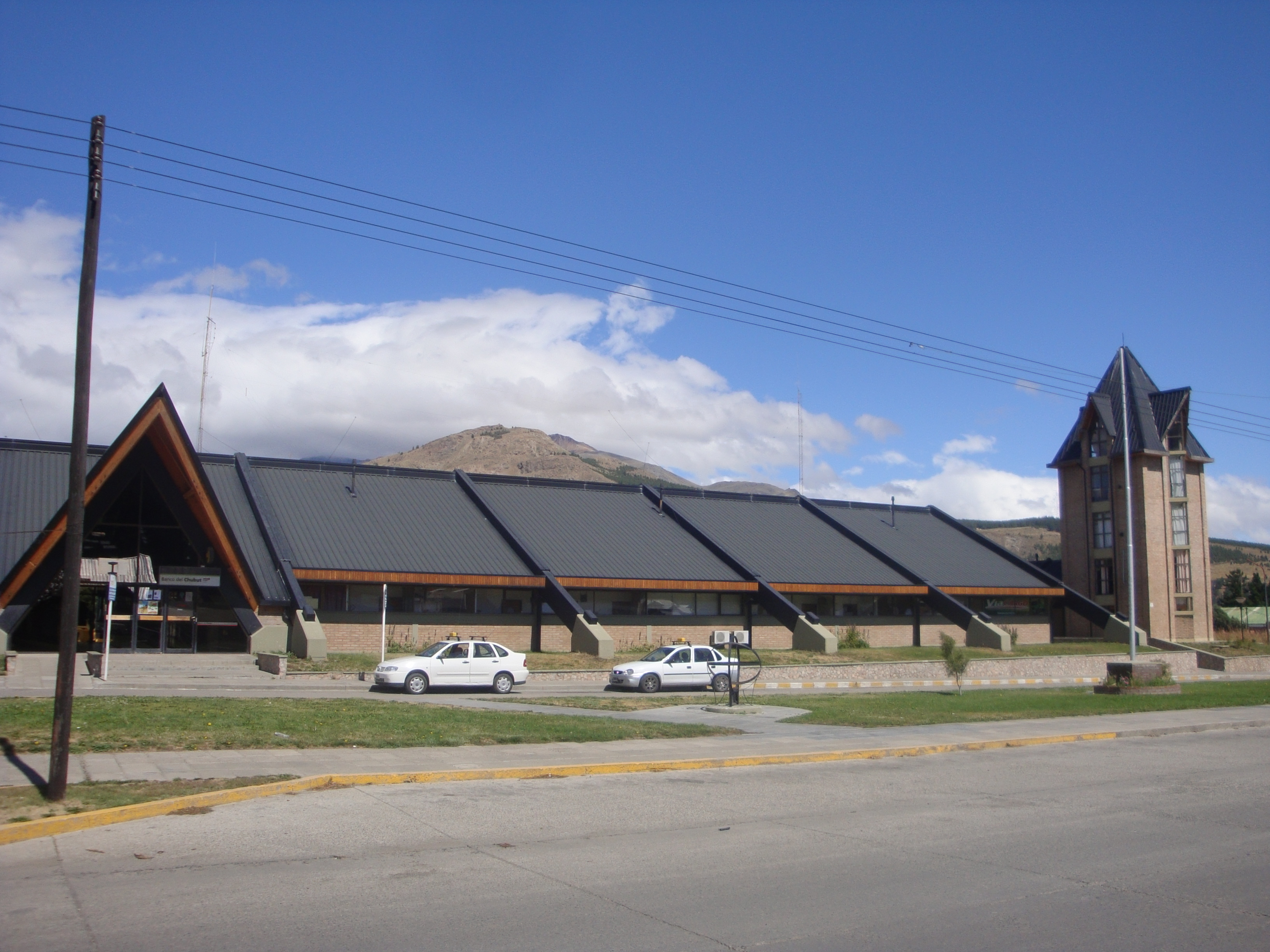
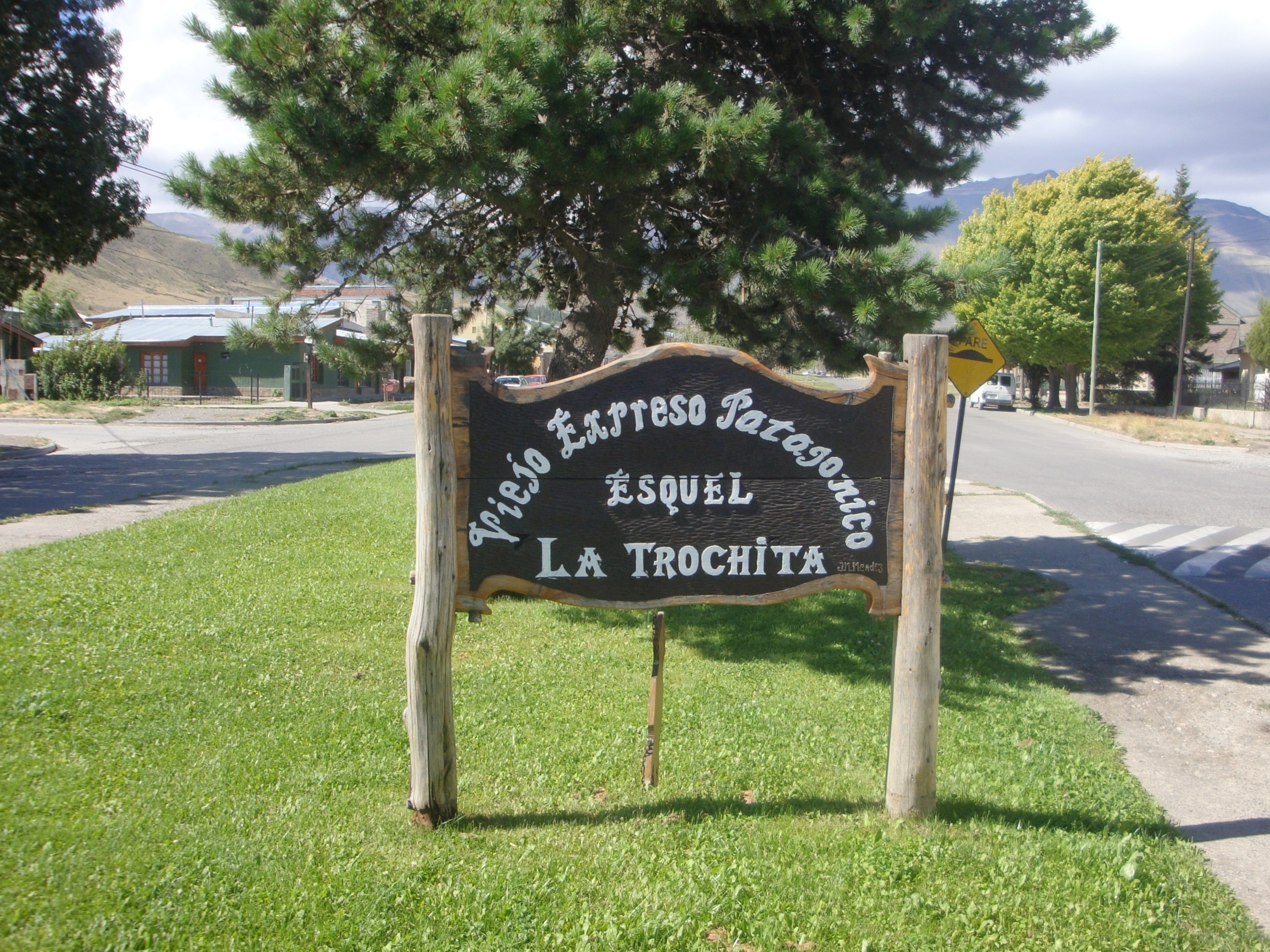

- Location of Esquel in Argentina
- Coordinates: 42°54′S 71°19′W
- Country: Argentina
- Province: Chubut
- Department: Futaleufú
- Founded: February 25, 1906

Government
  - Intendant: Matías Taccetta (PRO)
- Elevation: 563 m (1,847 ft)

Population (2010 census)
  - Total: 32,343
- Time zone: UTC−3 (ART)
- CPA base: U9200
- Dialing code: +54 2945
- Climate: Csb
- Website: esquel.gov.ar

Esquel is a town in the northwest of Chubut Province in Argentine Patagonia. It is located in Futaleufú Department, of which it is the government seat. Esquel is the home station for “La Trochita,” a historic narrow gauge railway known in English as “The Old Patagonian Express.” Esquel is also known for its ski area, “La Hoya,” and as a gateway city to Los Alerces National Park, a UNESCO protected reserve featuring some of the oldest trees in South America. The name Esquel derives from one of two Tehuelche words: one meaning "marsh" and the other meaning "land of burrs", which refers to the many thorny plants including the pimpinella, and the other meaning herbaceous plants whose fruits, when ripe, turn into prickly burrs that stick to the animals' skins and wool or people's clothes as a way of propagation. According to the late Elvey MacDonald, Esquel was named Tre'r Ysgall (Town of thistles) by the original Welsh settlers. As the Spanish-speaking population of the area increased, they found it difficult pronouncing the word Ysgall, and, over time, Ysgall evolved to Esquel.

== History ==
The founding of the town dates back to the arrival of Welsh immigrants in Chubut in 1865. The settlement was created on 25 February 1906, as an extension of the Colonia 16 de Octubre, that also contains the town of Trevelin.

The city, the main town of the area, is located by the Esquel Stream and surrounded by the mountains La Zeta, La Cruz, Cerro 21 and La Hoya. La Hoya is known as a ski resort with good quality snow right through the spring. The Los Alerces National Park is 50 km (31 mi) northwest of the city.

An important tourist attraction is the narrow-gauge railway (with 750 mm (30 in) between the rails), known as La Trochita locally and in English as The Old Patagonian Express after the book The Old Patagonian Express by Paul Theroux. At 402 km (250 mi) in length, it is said to be the only narrow-gauge long-distance line in operation and the southernmost railway in the world. The first fifty oil-fired steam locomotives were made by Henschel & Son of Germany in 1922. Later twenty-five locomotives were bought from the Baldwin Locomotive Works of Philadelphia.

The train remains authentic and in operation thanks to the effort of the team of workers at Talleres Ferroviarios El Maiten, that make several parts by hand. Trains now run as a tourist excursion between Esquel and the small settlement of Nahuel Pan, located at the foot of the volcano of the same name, with other services all the way to El Maitén. Until 1993, the train ran all the way to the city of Ingeniero Jacobacci in Río Negro Province, from where trains ran to Viedma, Río Negro and from there to Buenos Aires, forming the General Roca railway.

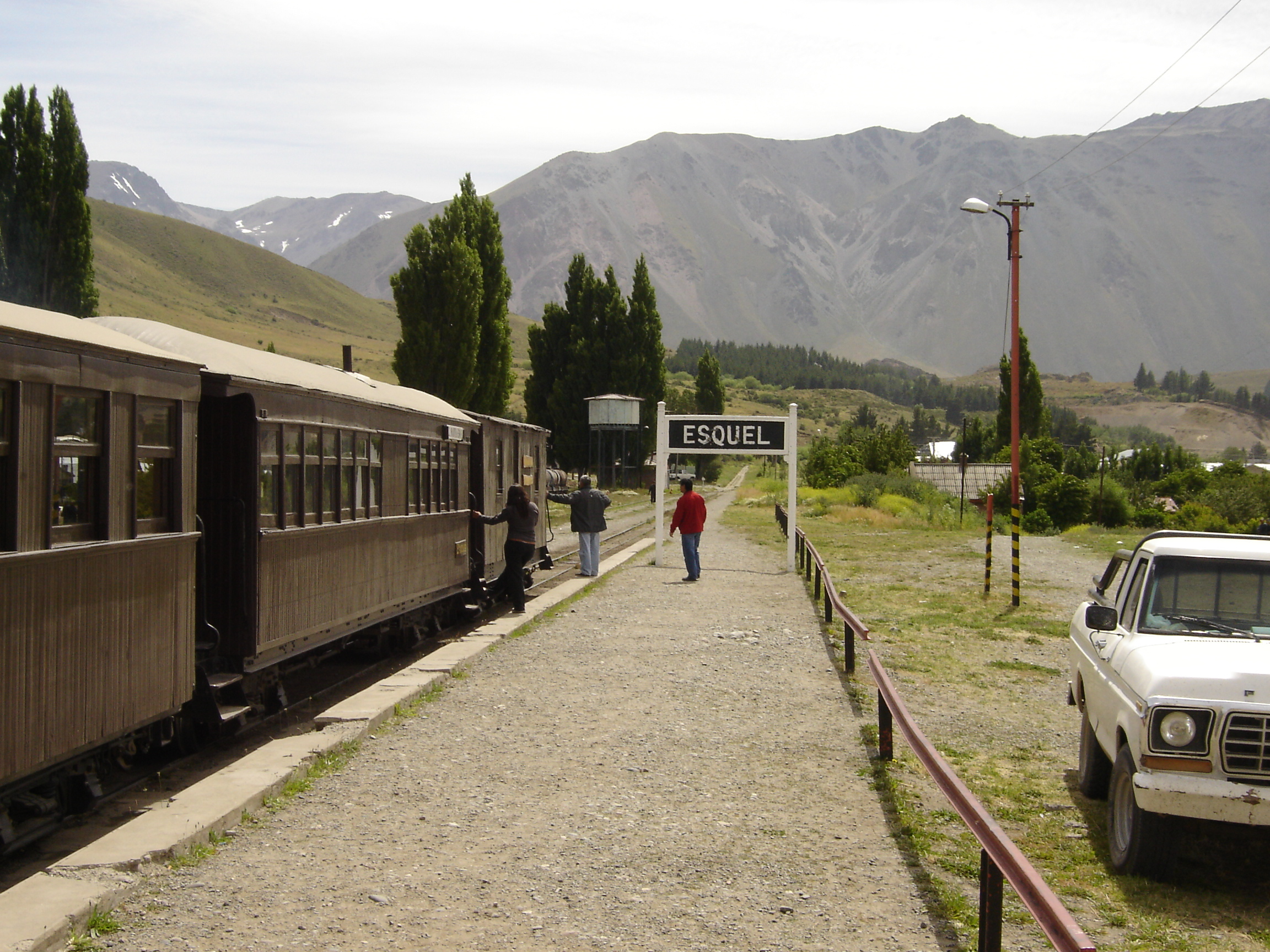
The Old Patagonian Express at Esquel station

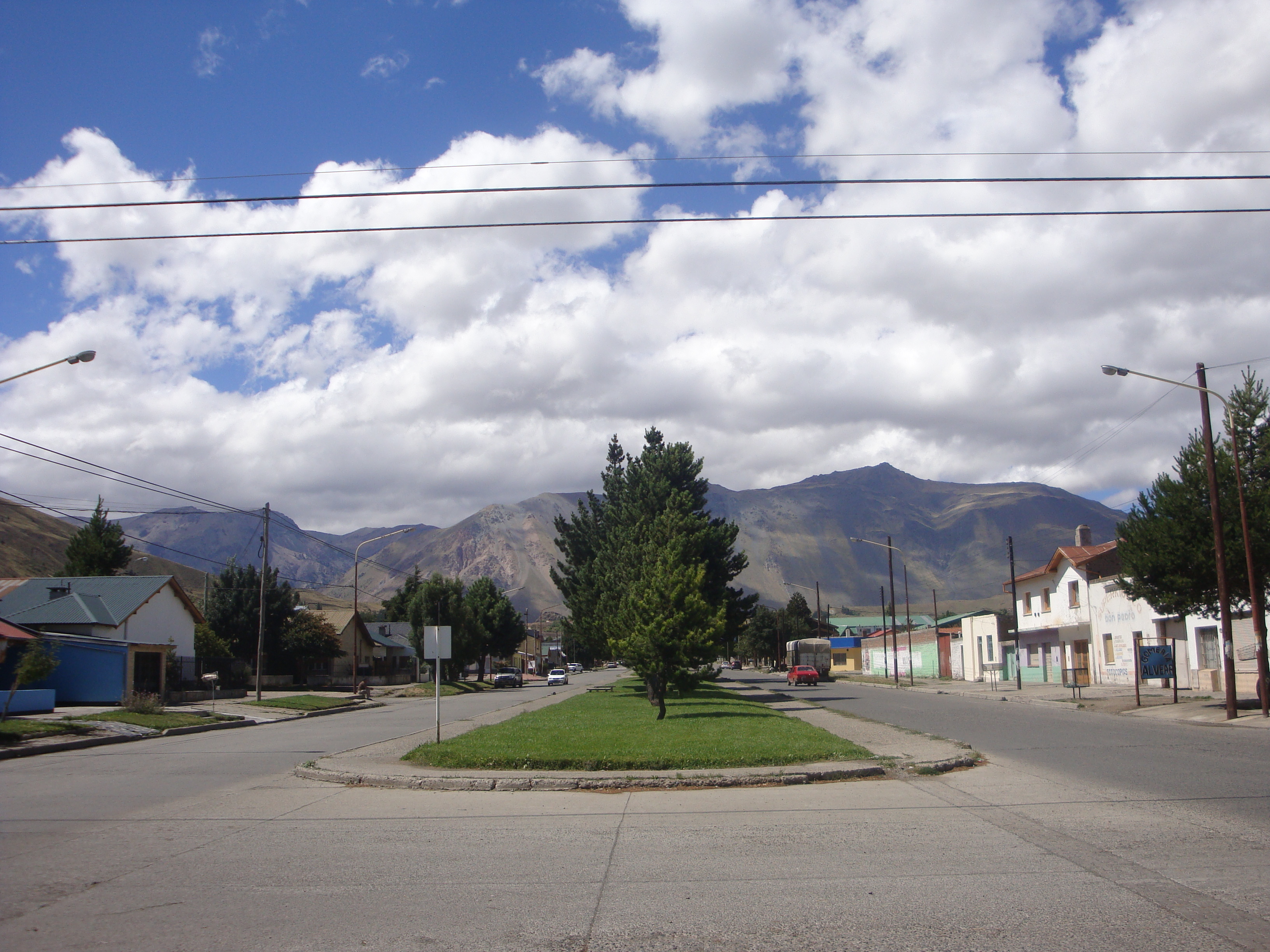
Avenida Alvear

According to the 2001 census [INDEC], the Esquel district had about 28,000 inhabitants, with one of the highest rates of growth in the province, mainly as result of the immigration of people from Buenos Aires, but also from other provinces. It has wide cement streets with sidewalks, and is clean and well maintained. Their hospital is the primary one for the zone and is often a destination for "Medical Tourism" from both foreigners and Porteños (residents of Buenos Aires) alike.

In 2003 a mining referendum was held in Esquel with 81% of voters, with a participation rate of 75%, rejected the establishment a mining project by Median Gold. The mine was estimated to create 1,500 jobs during ten years.

In May 2009, Esquel was twinned with Aberystwyth in Wales; with representatives of the Welsh town traveling to Argentina to participate in the signing of a charter formalising the link.

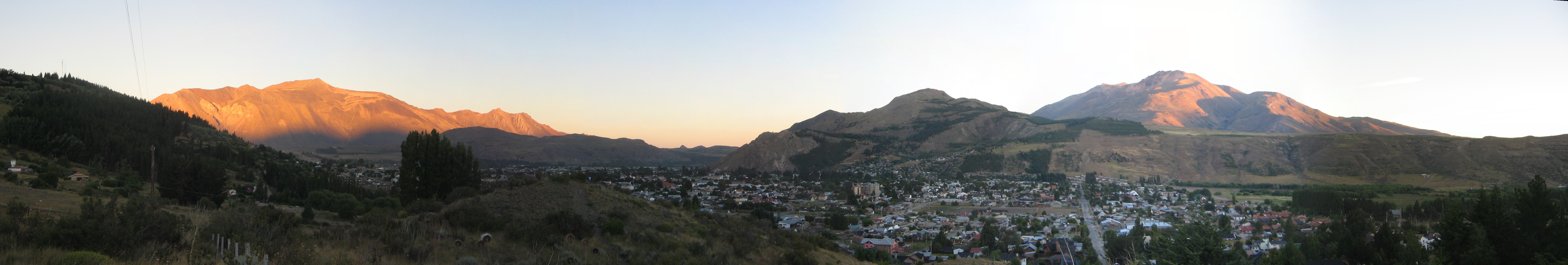
Panoramic view of Esquel from a nearby hill

== Esquel meteorite ==
In 1951 a farmer found a 755 kilograms (1,664 lb) meteorite, later called Esquel, while digging a hole for a water tank. When cut and polished, the meteorite showed beautiful yellowish olivine (peridot) crystals. The Esquel meteorite is known worldwide among collectors and the scientific community.

== Climate ==
Owing to its location on the immediate leeward side of the Andes, Esquel has a cool summer Mediterranean climate (Köppen Csb) bordering on a Humid continental climate (Köppen Dsb). Other climate systems, such as the Trewartha climate classification, place it within the oceanic zone (Do), like much of Western Europe and the Pacific Northwest. Temperatures are relatively cold for its climate due to its higher altitude. Summers are mild with warm temperatures during the afternoon followed by cool nights. The mean temperature during the summer is around 14 °C (57.2 °F). It's the sunniest season, averaging as much as 10 hours of sunshine per day in January with an average of 7–8 clear days and only 5-7 overcast days. Spring and fall are transition seasons featuring mild temperatures during the day and cool to cold nights. Spring starts out with cool temperatures during the day and very cold nights which progressively becomes warmer. Both spring and fall have highly variable weather.

Winters vary from cool to cold with mean temperatures close to freezing while precipitation is high. Temperatures regularly fall below freezing during the winter nights. Winters are characterized by cloudy weather, averaging 11-13 overcast days from June to August. Snow falls on average on twenty days each winter but accumulation is usually less than 10 cm (4 in). The average date of the first frost occurs on March 7 while the average date of the last frost occurs on November 10 although frosts have been recorded in all months.

The average relative humidity is 62%, ranging from a high of 77% in June and July to a low of 49% in January. Summers have lower humidity due to higher temperatures. Most of the wind comes from the west or the southwest with calm days being uncommon. The relief modifies the wind speeds with southern areas receiving more wind than the north. Mean wind speeds range from 17.4 km/h (10.8 mph) in July to 30.4 km/h (18.9 mph) in December with summers being more windy than winters. Esquel receives an average annual precipitation of 504.2 millimetres (20 in) a year; much of it being concentrated in the winter months. Esquel, which lies in the zone of transition between the wetter Andes to the west and the steppes to the east, records higher precipitation in the town than in the airport located 13 km (8.1 mi) to the east. It is estimated that Esquel receives an average of 7 hours of sunshine per day, ranging from a high of 10 hours in January to a low of 5 hours in July.

Climate data for Esquel (1991–2020, extremes 1901–present) (Note: The record highs and lows are based on the Secretaria de Mineria link for the period 1901–1990 while records beyond 1990 come from the Servicio Meteorológico Nacional link since it only covers from 1961–present. When these 2 sources are used together, the record highs and lows are from the period 1901–present)
Month	Jan	Feb	Mar	Apr	May	Jun	Jul	Aug	Sep	Oct	Nov	Dec	Year
Record high °C (°F)	38.6 (101.5)	35.6 (96.1)	32.2 (90.0)	27.0 (80.6)	22.3 (72.1)	21.2 (70.2)	20.7 (69.3)	19.5 (67.1)	23.7 (74.7)	29.6 (85.3)	32.6 (90.7)	35.0 (95.0)	38.6 (101.5)
Mean daily maximum °C (°F)	22.0 (71.6)	22.3 (72.1)	19.2 (66.6)	14.7 (58.5)	10.5 (50.9)	7.0 (44.6)	6.2 (43.2)	8.7 (47.7)	11.9 (53.4)	14.6 (58.3)	17.6 (63.7)	20.1 (68.2)	14.6 (58.3)
Daily mean °C (°F)	15.4 (59.7)	15.1 (59.2)	12.4 (54.3)	8.4 (47.1)	5.2 (41.4)	2.6 (36.7)	1.7 (35.1)	3.4 (38.1)	5.6 (42.1)	8.4 (47.1)	11.3 (52.3)	13.7 (56.7)	8.6 (47.5)
Mean daily minimum °C (°F)	8.6 (47.5)	8.1 (46.6)	5.8 (42.4)	2.9 (37.2)	0.8 (33.4)	−1.4 (29.5)	−2.4 (27.7)	−1.1 (30.0)	0.2 (32.4)	2.3 (36.1)	4.9 (40.8)	7.3 (45.1)	3.0 (37.4)
Record low °C (°F)	−5.4 (22.3)	−4.6 (23.7)	−7.0 (19.4)	−11.5 (11.3)	−12.5 (9.5)	−21.2 (−6.2)	−22.8 (−9.0)	−20.9 (−5.6)	−14.8 (5.4)	−10.3 (13.5)	−7.0 (19.4)	−4.5 (23.9)	−22.8 (−9.0)
Average precipitation mm (inches)	22.1 (0.87)	20.8 (0.82)	23.5 (0.93)	41.1 (1.62)	64.5 (2.54)	81.1 (3.19)	64.5 (2.54)	55.3 (2.18)	29.4 (1.16)	28.7 (1.13)	21.3 (0.84)	20.3 (0.80)	472.6 (18.61)
Average precipitation days (≥ 0.1 mm)	3.8	4.1	5.3	7.0	9.5	11.6	9.7	10.4	6.8	6.2	4.9	3.9	83.2
Average snowy days	0.1	0.1	0.1	0.8	2.5	5.6	7.1	6.5	3.1	1.6	0.7	0.1	28.1
Average relative humidity (%)	47.4	49.9	56.0	63.0	72.1	75.4	75.3	70.1	61.7	55.0	49.9	47.5	60.3
Mean monthly sunshine hours	325.5	274.0	232.5	186.0	130.2	102.0	120.9	164.3	195.0	251.1	288.0	313.1	2,582.6
Mean daily sunshine hours	10.5	9.7	7.5	6.2	4.2	3.4	3.9	5.3	6.5	8.1	9.6	10.1	7.1
Source 1: Servicio Meteorológico Nacional
Source 2: Secretaria de Mineria (extremes 1901–1990), FAO (percent sun only),

== See also ==
- Old Patagonian Express

== Books ==
- Gut, Bernardo (2008). Trees in Patagonia. Springer. doi:10.1007/978-3-7643-8838-6. ISBN 978-3-7643-8837-9.
