= Neopseustidae =

Scientific classification
- Kingdom: Animalia
- Phylum: Arthropoda
- Clade: Pancrustacea
- Class: Insecta
- Order: Lepidoptera
- Clade: Coelolepida
- Clade: Myoglossata
- Infraorder: Neopseustina; Davis & Nielsen, 1980
- Superfamily: Neopseustoidea
- Family: Neopseustidae

Genera
- Apoplania Davis, 1975; Nematocentropus Hwang, 1965; Neopseustis Meyrick, 1909; Synempora Davis and Nielsen, 1980

Diversity
- About 13 species

Small family containing the archaic bell moths

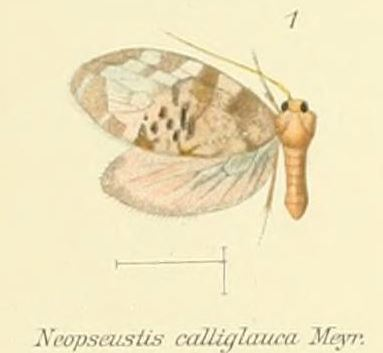

Neopseustidae is a small family of day and night-flying "archaic bell moths" in the order Lepidoptera. They are classified into their own superfamily Neopseustoidea and infraorder Neopseustina. Four genera are known. These primitive moths are restricted to South America and Southeast Asia. Their biology is unknown (Davis 1975; Davis and Nielsen 1980, 1984; Kristensen, 1999).

Nematocentropus appears to be the most primitive genus occurring in Assam, Myanmar and Sichuan, China. Three species of Neopseustis are distributed from Assam to Taiwan, whilst Synempora andesae and three species of Apoplania occur in southern South America (Kristensen, 1999: 53–54). The morphology of the antennae (Faucheux 2005ab; Faucheux et al., 2006) and the proboscis (Kristensen and Nielsen 1981) has been studied in detail.

== Sources ==
- Firefly Encyclopedia of Insects and Spiders, edited by Christopher O'Toole, ISBN 1-55297-612-2, 2002
