= Optional referendum =

Type of Swiss popular vote opposing or requesting the introduction of a new law

The optional referendum is a referendum which comes from a request by governmental authorities or the public. The best-known type of optional referendum is the popular initiative to request a law, and the popular (or abrogative) referendum to repeal a law. The collection of signatures from the public is normally necessary to organize an optional referendum, but some jurisdictions allow government agencies to request for a referendum also. It is a form of direct democracy.

The optional referendum is in contrast to a mandatory referendum in that it is a requested referendum, whereas the subject matter of a mandatory referendum is a legally required to be put to a referendum.

== Types ==
There are a few major types of optional referendums:

- Authorities plebiscite: A referendum that is voluntarily placed on the ballot by a governmental authority (usually a legislature)
- Initiative referendum: A citizen-led effort to suggest and vote on a proposed law.
- Popular referendum: A citizen-led effort to oppose or repeal a law.
- Recall referendum: A citizen-led effort to remove an elected official before the end of their term of office. Depending on the area and position, a recall may be for a specific individual, such as an individual legislator, or more general such as an entire legislature.

== Switzerland ==
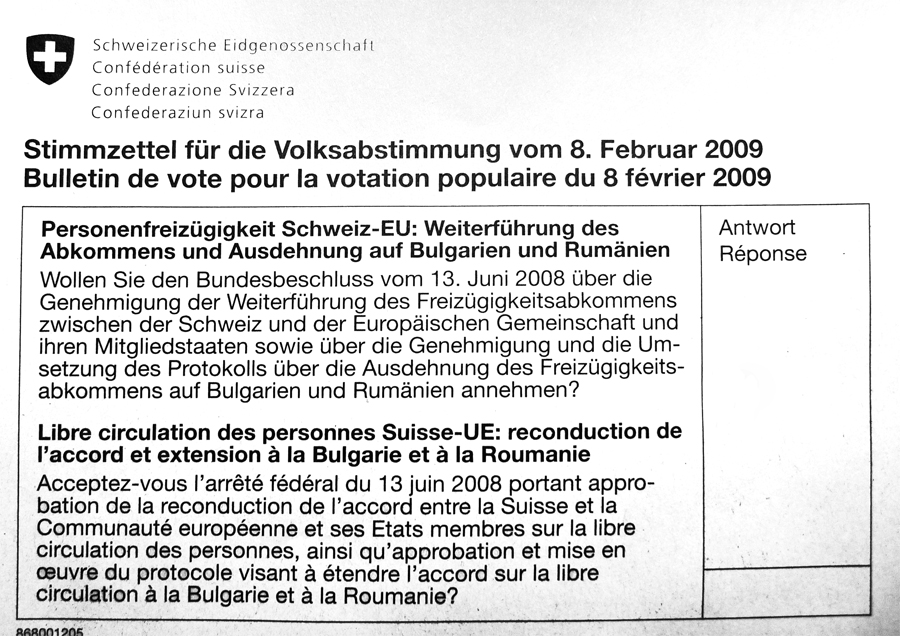
A ballot paper of the votation, organised on 8 February 2009, on the extension of the free movement of persons to Bulgaria and Romania.

In Switzerland the popular referendum is known as a facultative referendum (German: fakultatives Referendum; French: référendum facultatif, Italian: referendum facoltativo, Romansh: referendum facultativ). It allows citizens to oppose laws voted by the federal parliament, cantonal and/or municipal decrees by legislative and/or executive bodies. In addition Switzerland knows popular initiatives, which allows citizens to propose new laws and to change the constitution.

=== History ===
The popular referendum was first introduced in the cantons (e.g. in the Canton of Zurich since 1869). At federal level, the optional referendum was introduced by the Federal Constitution of 1874 (Article 74).

The ratification of the Gotthard Treaty of 1909 triggered widespread protests and ultimately led to a petition being submitted. In the referendum of 1921, the optional referendum for state treaties that are valid for more than 15 years or for an indefinite period of time was then introduced.

The number of signatures required from Swiss voters for a popular referendum was initially 30,000. Due to the massive increase in the number of voters due to population growth and the introduction of women's suffrage in 1971, the number was increased to 50,000 valid signatures in 1977.

In Switzerland, a cantonal referendum was held for the first and only time in 2003. It related to changes in marriage, family and housing taxation (the so-called "tax package"). The contested bill was rejected in the referendum on 16 May 2004.

=== Federal level ===
On a federal level a vote will be organised on every law against which opponent collect 50,000 valid signatures during the period of 100 days after publication by the parliament.

A referendum can also be requested by a minimum of eight cantons, the so-called cantonal referendum (not to be confused with a mandatory or optional referendum on a cantonal level).

Swiss optional referendum statistics
Optional referendums	1874-1950	1951-1980	1981- Nov. 2014	Total
Accepted	20	19	59	98
Rejected	34	18	26	78
Total	54	37	85	176
Source: Swiss Federal Statistical Office

== Bibliography ==
- Vincent Golay and Mix et Remix, Swiss political institutions, Éditions loisirs et pédagogie, 2008. ISBN 978-2-606-01295-3.
