= Mandatory referendum =

Form of plebiscite

A mandatory referendum, also known as an obligatory referendum, is a referendum that is legally required to be held under specific circumstances. This is in contrast to an optional referendum, which comes from either by public or legislative request. The actions that require mandatory referendums are set by law and normally concern major governmental actions or matters of large public significance. The most commonly found example worldwide of a mandatory referendum is a required referendum to adopt or amend a national constitution, which exists in many countries.

== Austria ==
In Austria, a mandatory referendum at the federal level is provided for in the event of an overall amendment to the federal constitution (Art. 44 para. 3 B-VG). An overall amendment to the constitution occurs when one or more of the construction principles of the constitution (democratic, federal, rule of law, separation of powers or liberal construction principle) are seriously changed. It is controversial whether only the National Council or also the Federal President can decide whether a constitutional amendment is categorized as an overall amendment and whether a referendum should therefore be held. According to the case law of the Constitutional Court, the implementation of a referendum cannot be forced, but is finally decided by the National Council. Failure to hold a referendum in the event of an overall amendment to the Federal Constitution can only be criticized as a procedural defect in the legislative process.

The referendum of June 12, 1994 on Austria's accession to the European Union was an obligatory referendum at the federal level. In the summer of 2008 - a few weeks after the ratification of the Lisbon Treaty - the Social Democratic Party of Austria campaigned for mandatory referendums on major changes to the EU treaties. A corresponding parliamentary initiative requested mandatory referendums on major EU treaty amendments initially found a parliamentary majority, but ultimately failed due to the requirement of a two-thirds majority.

A decision by the Federal Assembly to remove the Federal President before the end of his term of office (Art. 60, Para. 6 B-VG) triggers a mandatory referendum. So far there has been no use case for this.

=== Local referendums in Austria ===
At the state level, mandatory referendums are planned in the states of Vorarlberg and Salzburg. In Salzburg, every "general amendment to the state constitution" must be submitted to a referendum before it is announced in the state law gazette. In Vorarlberg, a mandatory referendum for individual, specially designated fundamental changes is ordered. In 1998 there was an obligatory referendum in Salzburg to abolish the mandatory proportional representation of the state government.

The mandatory referendum in the city of Salzburg is planned at the municipal level. A referendum must be held in the event of a significant change in the urban landscapes that shape the cityscape. [11] In this way, the protection of urban landscapes anchored in the City of Salzburg's Grassland Declaration is safeguarded against deterioration. In Carinthia there is a mandatory referendum in the event of a planned demise of a municipality.

== Switzerland ==
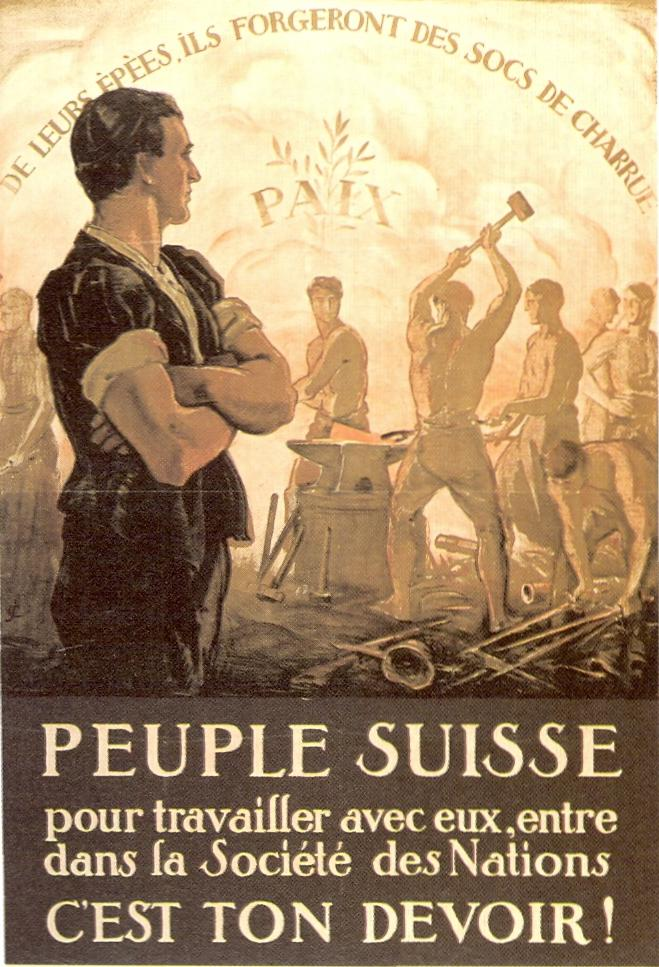
A poster in support of the admission of Switzerland in the League of Nations (1920). Switzerland joined the United Nations in 2002.

Mandatory referendums in Switzerland, generally known as an obligatory referendum (German: obligatorisches Referendum, French: référendum obligatoire, Italian: referendum obbligatorio, Romansh: referendum obligatoric) are a relatively common instrument of direct democracy. It is a mechanism that holds mandatory votation of some decisions of the federal, cantonal, or municipal parliament and/or government, such as modifications of the Constitution or adhesion to supranational communities on a federal or cantonal level, or for example substantial financial decisions decreed by cantonal and/or communal executive and/or legislative bodies.

=== National mandatory referendums in Switzerland ===
Switzerland has three main subjects that require a mandatory referendum at the federal level:

- For a total or partial revision of the federal constitution
- To join a collective security organization (e.g. the United Nations) or a supranational community (e.g. the European Union)
- To introduce urgent federal legislation without the required constitutional basis and which will be in force for longer than a year.

The three subjects above require both a majority of the votes in the popular vote as well as in majority of the cantons (double majority).

Swiss Mandatory referendum statistics
Mandatory referendums	1848-1950	1951-1980	1981-March 2020	Total
Accepted	43	58	73	174
Rejected	20	17	29	66
Total	63	75	102	240
Source: Swiss Federal Statistical Office

== See also ==
- Citizens' Initiative Referendum
- Optional referendum
- Popular initiative (Switzerland)

== Bibliography ==
- Vincent Golay and Mix et Remix, Swiss political institutions, Éditions loisirs et pédagogie, 2008. ISBN 978-2-606-01295-3.
