= Channel 7 (Rawson, Argentina) =

LU 90 TV Canal 7
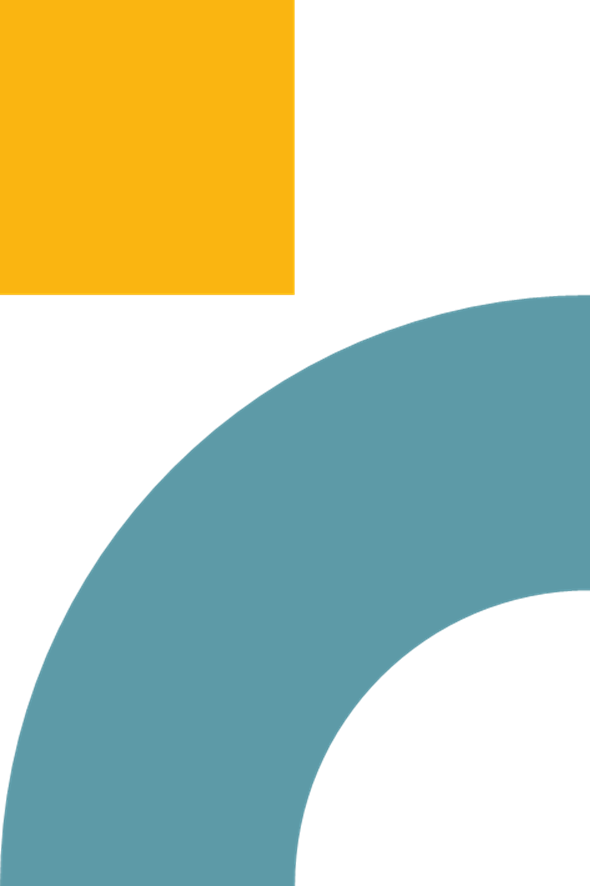
- Rawson, Chubut; Argentina
- Channels: Analog: 7 (VHF); Digital: 27 (UHF)
- Branding: Canal 7

Programming
- Affiliations: Televisión Pública

Ownership
- Owner: Government of Chubut Province

History
- First air date: September 15, 1975
- Former names: CHBTV (2003-2011); Televisión Pública del Chubut (2014-2016)

Technical information
- Licensing authority: ENACOM

Canal 7 Rawson is an Argentine television station licensed to Rawson, Chubut Province. The station is operated by the provincial government and has a network of relays.

== History ==
On March 24, 1970, by means of Decree 1197, the National Executive Chamber gave the city of Rawson, capital of Chubut, a license to operate VHF channel 7.

The license started its regular broadcasts on September 15, 1975 as LU 90 TV Canal 7 de Rawson, coinciding with the 110th anniversary of the city's founding.

On February 18, 1986, COMFER, by means of Resolution 128, authorized the provincial government to install a relay station in Corcovado, granting it VHF channel 13. Later, on June 5, 1986, through Resolution 387, the provincial government was authorized to install relay stations in Colan Conhué (channel 13) and Lagunita Salada (channel 10)

On May 24, 1990, through Decree 999, the National Executive Chamber gave the provincial government the installation of a provincial over-the-air network for Canal 7.

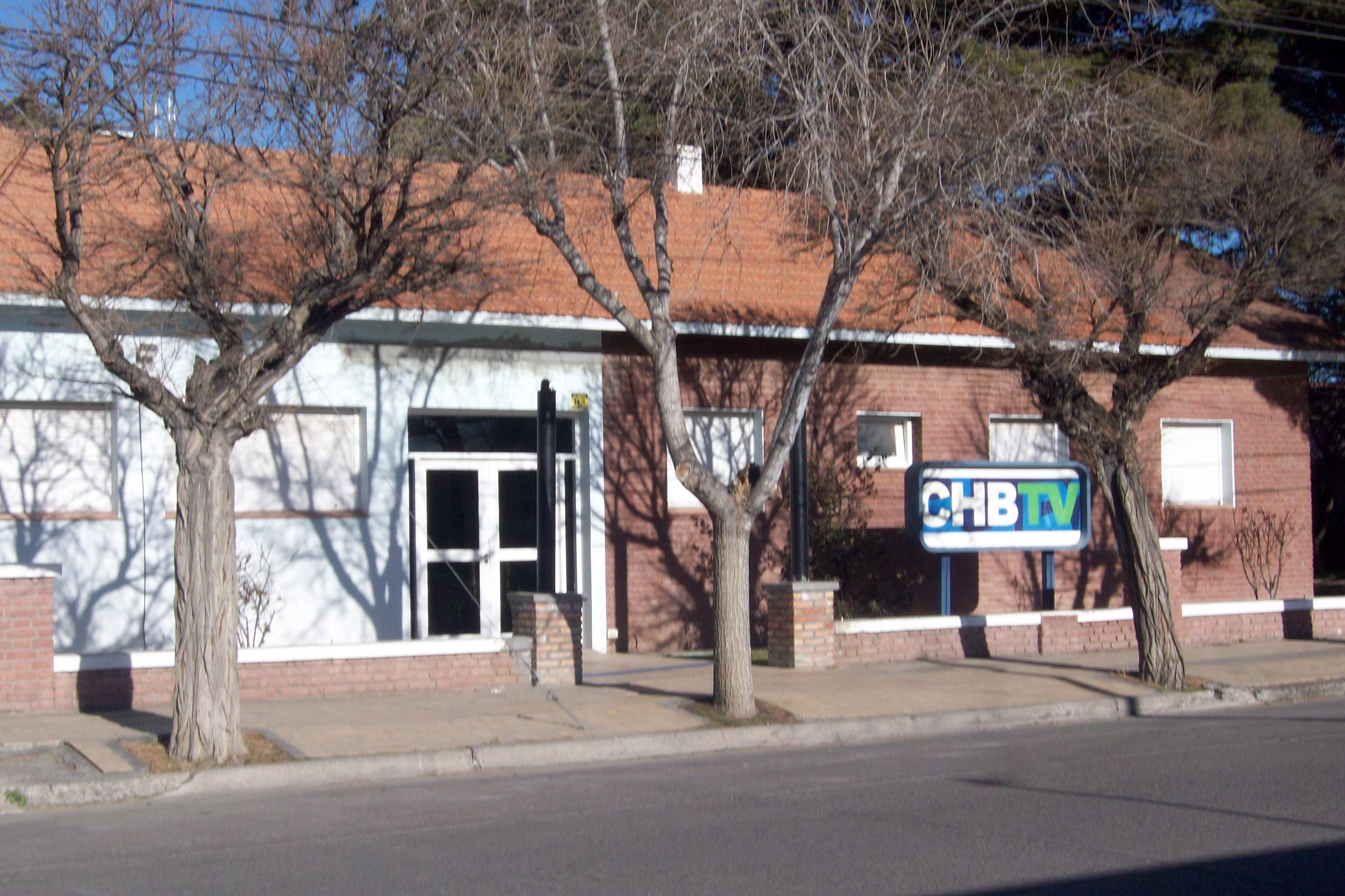
Front of the station's headquarters.

On March 22, 2005, COMFER, through Resolution 217, authorized the provincial government to install relay stations in Arroyo Verde, Blancuntre, Cerro Centinela, Chacay Oeste, Corcovado, Costa del Chubut, El Mirasol, Fofo Cahuel, Lago Blanco, Lepá, Ranquil Huao, Río Percey, Sepaucal, Sierra Colorada y Yala Laubat; using channels 7, 4 and 13.

The documentary Malvinas, en el corazón de Chubut broadcast in 2010, featuring testimonials from fighters who came from the province, won the "Lanín de Oro" award in 2011.

On June 24, 2011, AFSCA, through Resolution 689, gave Canal 7 UHF channel 29 to deliver its digital signal.

In 2012, during the management of Martín Buzzi, the station relaunched its corporate identity, as well as its programming, which included more original output and relays from the national channels. That same year, the morning program Mañana Express presented its first edition in high definition, becoming the first such program to do so in Argentine Patagonia.

In November 2015, the station started broadcasting on the TDA platform on channel 27.1 as a test channel and in standard definition until the inauguration of new studios in Rawson and the production of its content in high definition. Additionally, with the building of a transmitter at Cerro Chenque in Comodoro Rivadavia, the possibility of improving its over-the-air signal to southern Chubut was viable, since the city did not have a stable relay station.

In 2016, the Legislature of Chubut Province attempted, without success, to have a program on the station, on Wednesday nights. Governor Mario Das Neves vetoed a provincial law sanctioning the program alleging that it had no advertising, making it costly to produce: it occupied the slot of the program with more time on air on the station, and was an "abuse" of legislative power, as assembling the station's schedule was a faculty of the administrative government.

In May that year, the station resumed broadcasting from its historical transmitter, with a new 300 m² studio. in an official act, the station's schedule was also relaunched as well as a new studio opened, with Mariano Arcioni and authorities.

In August 2016, the public stations of Patagonia (including Canal 7) created "Red Patagónica de la Televisión Pública" with the aim of allowing viewers to access a regional Patagonian news program with current political, economic, sports, cultural and tourist information.

On June 29, 2023, the station shut down its analog signal as part of the closure of analog stations in Argentine Patagonia, according to ENACOM Decree nº. 156/2022.

== Programming ==
Currently, part of its schedule consists of relays of Contenidos Públicos channels Encuentro and Pakapaka. Until year-end 2011, the station relayed programs from commercial television networks, mainly from El Trece; the end of these relays caused the channel to save AR$1,5 million.

The station also has local programming, among them Informativo 7 (its news operation), Media mañana (morning magazine) and Platos al aire (cooking show) among other local programs.

== Informativo 7 ==
Informativo 7 is the station's news service, with emphasis on Chubut Province. currently it has two editions which are shown on weekdays (at 12:30 and 20:00).

Originally it was named Chubut al día, on April 29, 2013, it changed it name to Informativo 7, until June 1, 2016, becoming 7 Noticias.

On January 14, 2019, it was renamed Noticiero 7, and from June 10, 2024, after the change in its identity, the name was reverted to Informativo 7.

Since September 17, 2016, Canal 7 airs a weekly news round-up, Resumen Patagónico de Noticias, where the news services of the stations that make up Red Patagónica de la Televisión Pública take part (including Canal 7).

== Relayers ==
Canal 7 has 62 relay stations throughout the province. The relayers receive the signal which is later sent through its own teleport and subsequently sent to the ARSAT-1 satellite.

Provincia del Chubut
Channel	Location of the relay
8	Aldea Apeleg
3	Aldea Beleiro
10	Aldea Epulef
12	Alto Río Senguer
7	Arroyo Verde
7	Bahía Bustamante
7	Blancuntre
12	Buen Pasto
2	Camarones
8	Carrenleufú
4	Cerro Centinela
7	Cerro Cóndor
7	Chacay Oeste
8	Cholila
13	Colan Conhué
13	Comodoro Rivadavia
13	Corcovado
7	Costa del Chubut
7/12	Cushamen
12	Dique Florentino Ameghino
4	El Escorial
11	El Maitén
7	El Mirasol
7	El Turbio
4	Epuyén
2	Esquel
7	Facundo
7	Fofo Cahuel
8	Gan Gan
8	Garayalde
9	Gastre
9	Gobernador Costa
5	Gualjaina
13	Lago Blanco
10	Lago Puelo
7	Lago Rivadavia
9	Lago Rosario
10	Laguna Salada
2	Las Pampas
2	Las Plumas
7	Lepá
7	Los Alerces
13	Los Altares
5	Los Cipreses
7	Mina Paraná
12	Paso de Indios
11	Paso del Sapo
7	Piedra Parada
11	Puerto Madryn
7	Puerto Melo
2	Puerto Pirámides
7	Ranquil Huao
5	Ricardo Rojas
10	Río Mayo
7	Río Percy
11	Río Pico
7	Sarmiento
6	Tecka
4	Telsen
12	Trevelin
7	Yala Laubat
