= List of cities in Chubut =

This is a list of cities and towns in the Argentine province of Chubut.

- Aldea Apeleg
- Cerro Cóndor
- Comodoro Rivadavia
- Dolavon
- Esquel
- Gaiman
- José de San Martín
- Lago Blanco
- Lago Puelo
- Lagunita Salada
- Las Plumas
- Los Altares
- Paso de Indios
- Paso del Sapo
- Puerto Madryn
- Puerto Pirámides
- Rada Tilly
- Rawson
- Río Mayo
- Río Pico
- Sarmiento
- Tecka
- Telsen
- Trelew
- Trevelin
- Veintiocho de Julio
