= Mirasol =

Mirasol may refer to:

== Plants ==
- Mirasol, common sunflower in Spanish (also girasol)

== People ==
- Mirasol, a common female name popular in Philippines
- Alejandro Mirasol, Filipino politician

== Places ==
=== Buildings ===
- El Mirasol (mansion), a demolished mansion in Palm Beach, Florida, US
- Mira-sol (Barcelona–Vallès Line), a railway station in Barcelona, Spain
- Villa Mirasol (Les Sables d'Olonne), historic building in France

=== Inhabited places ===
- El Mirasol, a village and municipality in Argentina
- Villa Mirasol, a village and municipality, La Pampa Province, Argentina
- Mirasol, Lares, Puerto Rico, a barrio

== Other uses ==
- Interferometric modulator display (IMOD, trademarked mirasol), a reflective display technology used in electronic visual displays
- Mirasol chili, a Capsicum cultivar
- Mirasol, a fictional character in the fantasy novel Chalice by Robin McKinley
