= Lagunita Salada =

Coordinates: 42°44′35″S 69°08′49″W

- Municipality and village
- Interactive map of Lagunita Salada
- Country: Argentina
- Province: Chubut Province
- Department: Gastre Department
- Time zone: UTC−3 (ART)
- Climate: BSk

Lagunita Salada is a village and municipality in Chubut Province in southern Argentina.

== Geography ==
Lagunita Salada is a town located in the heart of the central plateau of the Chubut Province, very close to Gastre and 450 kilometers from Trelew. Notable nearby geographical features include the Cerro Gorro Frigio mountain and the Salina Quililache, a salt flat located to the west of the village.

== Demographics ==
According to data from the national censuses conducted by the National Institute of Statistics and Censuses (INDEC), the population of Lagunita Salada has experienced modest fluctuations over recent decades. In 1991, the settlement had 98 inhabitants. By the 2001 census, the population had increased to 141, representing a growth of over 43% during that decade. However, the 2010 census recorded a slight decline to 129 residents, reflecting an average annual decrease of approximately 0.99% between 2001 and 2010.

The 2010 census also reported a gender distribution of 74 males (57.4%) and 55 females (42.6%).

== History ==
Lagunita Salada was founded in 1952 around School No. 117 "Maestro César Rubio," which originally opened in 1939 on land donated by local resident Mussa Garay. The original school building collapsed in the early 1960s, prompting residents to rebuild at the current town site. The present school was constructed between 1972 and 1974. The Justice of the Peace Court began operating in 1946, was briefly moved to El Escorial in 1962, and returned to Lagunita Salada in 1980. The Rural Commune was established in 1985, with José Salin Chaina as its first president. The local police substation opened in 1989, and the Peuquén Niyeo Library was founded in 2003 by high school students.

== Culture ==
Lagunita Salada hosts the Accordion and Guitar Festival annually every January, welcoming 1,500 once a year. The festival began in 1992 as a tribute to a local resident. Famous Argentine chamamé, Monchito Merlo, attended the festival twice and in 2014, dedicated a chamamé to the village.
