= Río Mayo, Chubut =

Río Mayo
- Town
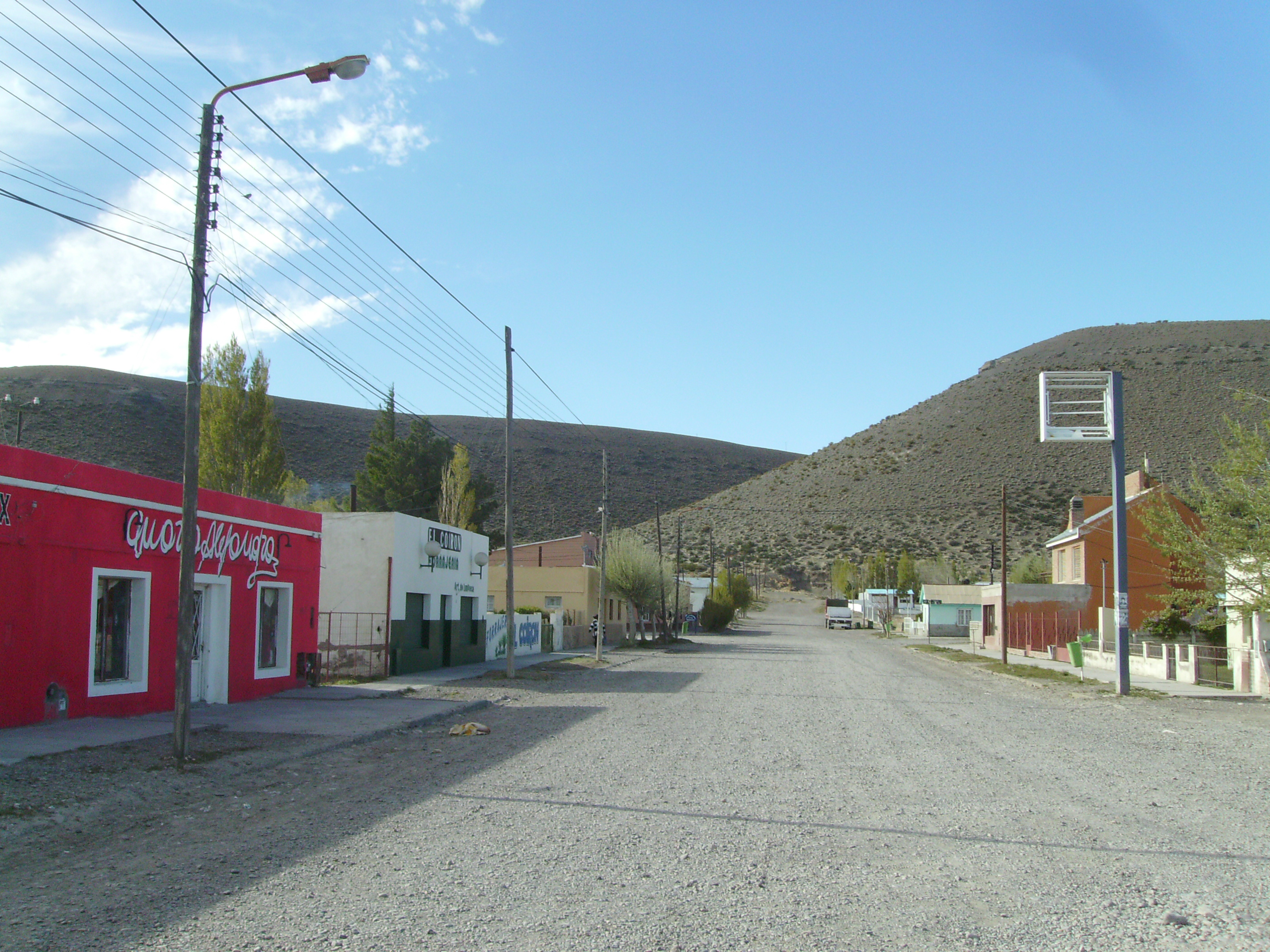

- Location of Río Mayo in Argentina
- Coordinates: 45°41′13″S 70°15′36″W
- Country: Argentina
- Province: Chubut
- Department: Río Senguer

Government
  - Intendant: Gustavo Loyaute
- Elevation: 460 m (1,510 ft)

Population (2010)
  - Total: 2,791
- Time zone: UTC−3 (ART)
- CPA base: U9030
- Dialing code: +54 2903
- Climate: Csc/Dsc

Río Mayo is a town located in the Río Senguer Department, in southwest Chubut Province, Argentina. It is an obligatory stopover of the Central Corridor towards Chile, close to two border crossings, one through the town of Lago Blanco to Balmaceda, Chile, and the other through Aldea Beleiro.

Río Mayo has the essential services for the visitor and also allows the practice of activities such as sport fishing, horseback riding, mountain biking and hiking.

== Climate ==
The Chubut town of Río Mayo has a harsh and rigorous climate for most of the year (the first frosts occur in March and April), characterized by prolonged cold and extremely hostile winters with an absolute minimum temperature of -27º C and freezing maximum temperatures, negative down to -21º C.

Climate data for Río Mayo (1991–2020)
Month	Jan	Feb	Mar	Apr	May	Jun	Jul	Aug	Sep	Oct	Nov	Dec	Year
Record high °C (°F)	37.5 (99.5)	37.0 (98.6)	35.0 (95.0)	30.0 (86.0)	25.0 (77.0)	19.0 (66.2)	22.5 (72.5)	23.5 (74.3)	26.0 (78.8)	27.0 (80.6)	34.0 (93.2)	36.0 (96.8)	37.5 (99.5)
Mean daily maximum °C (°F)	23.1 (73.6)	22.5 (72.5)	19.6 (67.3)	15.2 (59.4)	10.2 (50.4)	6.5 (43.7)	6.1 (43.0)	8.1 (46.6)	11.7 (53.1)	15.8 (60.4)	18.9 (66.0)	21.4 (70.5)	14.9 (58.8)
Daily mean °C (°F)	16.6 (61.9)	15.8 (60.4)	13.0 (55.4)	8.4 (47.1)	4.7 (40.5)	1.5 (34.7)	0.9 (33.6)	2.4 (36.3)	5.5 (41.9)	9.4 (48.9)	12.5 (54.5)	15.1 (59.2)	8.8 (47.8)
Mean daily minimum °C (°F)	10.4 (50.7)	9.8 (49.6)	7.5 (45.5)	2.7 (36.9)	0.1 (32.2)	−2.7 (27.1)	−3.5 (25.7)	−2.1 (28.2)	0.4 (32.7)	3.5 (38.3)	6.4 (43.5)	8.9 (48.0)	3.5 (38.3)
Record low °C (°F)	−1.0 (30.2)	0.0 (32.0)	−6.5 (20.3)	−10.0 (14.0)	−18.5 (−1.3)	−21.0 (−5.8)	−27.0 (−16.6)	−19.0 (−2.2)	−13.0 (8.6)	−10.0 (14.0)	−4.5 (23.9)	−3.0 (26.6)	−27.0 (−16.6)
Average precipitation mm (inches)	5.8 (0.23)	6.9 (0.27)	8.9 (0.35)	8.8 (0.35)	22.8 (0.90)	14.5 (0.57)	13.1 (0.52)	15.0 (0.59)	12.4 (0.49)	8.2 (0.32)	5.5 (0.22)	6.0 (0.24)	127.9 (5.04)
Source: Red Hidrológica Nacional
