= Viglione =

Viglione is a surname. Notable people with the surname include:

- Brian Viglione (born 1979), American musician
- Lou Viglione, NASCAR team owner
- Theresa Viglione, Italian and South African woman
- Mike Viglione (Ubiquitous), American rapper, one half of the rap duo Ces Cru

== See also ==
- Doctor Atilio Oscar Viglione, village and municipality in Argentina
