= Trinidad, Pando =

Trinity Trinidad
- City
- Location in Bolivia
- Coordinates: 11°10′41″S 66°30′59″W
- Country: Bolivia
- Department: Pando Department
- Elevation: 176 m (577 ft)
- Time zone: UTC-4 (BOT)

Trinidad is a city in Bolivia, 878 kilometres north of Sucre, the capital of Bolivia. The city is 23 kilometres away from Mentiroso Lake and Arroyo Verde Creek. Nearby settlements include: Buzeta, San Luis and Santo Domingo.

== Climate and geography ==
Because Trinidad is in the Amazon Rainforest of Bolivia, east of the Andes, there are no earthquakes in Trinidad.
