= Ricardo Rojas =

Ricardo Rojas may refer to:

- Ricardo Rojas (archer), Mexican archer
- Ricardo Rojas (writer), Argentine writer
- Ricardo Rojas (footballer, born 1971) Paraguayan football defender
- Ricardo Rojas (footballer, born 1974), Chilean football player
- Ricardo Rojas Frías, Cuban boxer
- Doctor Ricardo Rojas, a town in Chubut Province, Argentina
