= Villa Futalaufquen =

Coordinates: 42°53′41″S 71°36′58″W

- Municipality and village
- Interactive map of Villa Futalaufquen
- Country: Argentina
- Province: Chubut Province
- Department: Futaleufú Department
- Time zone: UTC−3 (ART)
- Climate: Cfb

Villa Futalaufquen is a village and municipality in Chubut Province in southern Argentina.
