= El Escorial (disambiguation) =

El Escorial is a palace-monastery near Madrid, Spain.

El Escorial may also refer to:

- El Escorial, Madrid, a nearby municipality
- San Lorenzo de El Escorial, the municipality in which the palace is situated
- El Escorial, Chubut, a village in Argentina.
