= Aldea Escolar =

- Village
- Interactive map of Aldea Escolar
- Country: Argentina
- Province: Chubut Province
- Department: Futaleufú Department
- Time zone: UTC−3 (ART)

Aldea Escolar is a village and municipality in Chubut Province in southern Argentina.
