= Gobernador Costa, Chubut =

Coordinates: 44°04′S 70°35′W

Gobernador Costa (Chubut)
- Municipality and village
- Interactive map of Gobernador Costa (Chubut)
- Country: Argentina
- Province: Chubut Province
- Department: Tehuelches Department

Government
  - Intendant: Miguel Gómez
- Time zone: UTC−3 (ART)
- Climate: BSk

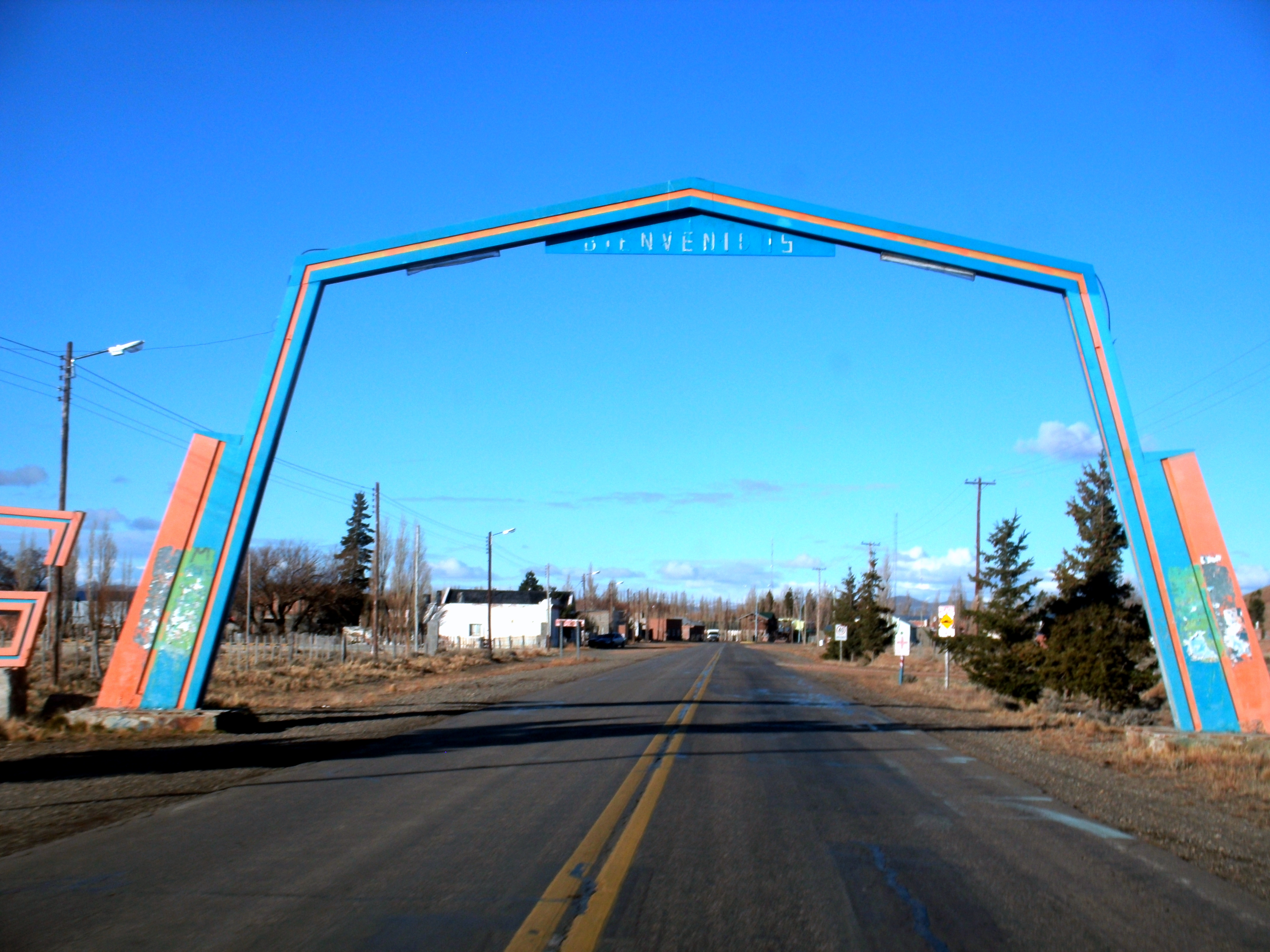
Gobernador Costa

Gobernador Costa (Chubut) is a village and municipality in Chubut Province in southern Argentina.

== Climate ==
Climate data for Gobernador Costa, Chubut (1961–1980)
Month	Jan	Feb	Mar	Apr	May	Jun	Jul	Aug	Sep	Oct	Nov	Dec	Year
Record high °C (°F)	35.4 (95.7)	34.5 (94.1)	33.2 (91.8)	25.1 (77.2)	21.3 (70.3)	19.0 (66.2)	15.4 (59.7)	19.7 (67.5)	23.0 (73.4)	26.7 (80.1)	29.0 (84.2)	30.0 (86.0)	35.4 (95.7)
Mean daily maximum °C (°F)	27.5 (81.5)	27.9 (82.2)	24.9 (76.8)	20.1 (68.2)	16.0 (60.8)	12.8 (55.0)	10.6 (51.1)	13.8 (56.8)	17.1 (62.8)	21.0 (69.8)	23.0 (73.4)	24.5 (76.1)	19.9 (67.8)
Daily mean °C (°F)	13.3 (55.9)	13.1 (55.6)	11.3 (52.3)	8.2 (46.8)	5.3 (41.5)	1.7 (35.1)	1.4 (34.5)	2.9 (37.2)	5.0 (41.0)	7.9 (46.2)	10.5 (50.9)	12.5 (54.5)	7.8 (46.0)
Mean daily minimum °C (°F)	6.0 (42.8)	5.1 (41.2)	3.7 (38.7)	1.3 (34.3)	−0.3 (31.5)	−3.1 (26.4)	−3.3 (26.1)	−1.9 (28.6)	−0.8 (30.6)	1.0 (33.8)	3.6 (38.5)	5.0 (41.0)	1.4 (34.5)
Record low °C (°F)	−3.2 (26.2)	−4.5 (23.9)	−9.3 (15.3)	−10.8 (12.6)	−14.4 (6.1)	−18.9 (−2.0)	−21.7 (−7.1)	−15.1 (4.8)	−14.3 (6.3)	−8.2 (17.2)	−5.6 (21.9)	−4.1 (24.6)	−21.7 (−7.1)
Average precipitation mm (inches)	5 (0.2)	5 (0.2)	14 (0.6)	14 (0.6)	18 (0.7)	24 (0.9)	25 (1.0)	25 (1.0)	10 (0.4)	9 (0.4)	10 (0.4)	9 (0.4)	168 (6.6)
Average snowy days	0.1	0.1	0	0.3	0.8	3	4	3	2	0.5	0	0	13.8
Average relative humidity (%)	50.0	52.5	55.5	62.0	69.0	75.5	72.5	70.5	63.0	59.0	55.5	54.0	61.6
Source 1: Secretaria de Mineria
Source 2: UNLP (snowfall data)
