= Estación de Fotobiología Playa Unión =

Research center in Argentina

Coordinates: 43°18′41″S 65°2′29″W

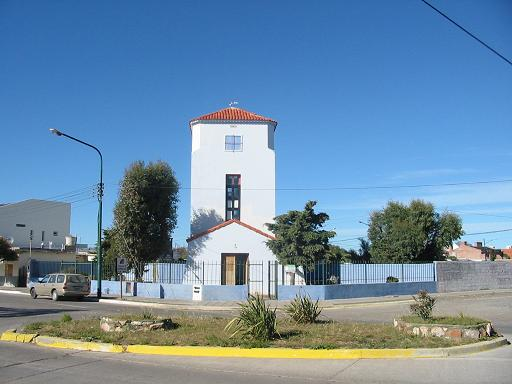
Estación de Fotobiología Playa Unión

The Estación de Fotobiología Playa Unión (EFPU; in English: 'Playa Unión Photobiology Station') is a non-profit organization, devoted to scientific research about the effects of ultraviolet radiation on aquatic ecosystems.

== Location ==
EFPU is located at Playa Unión, Chubut province, Argentina.
