= Corcovado, Chubut =

Coordinates: 43°32′S 71°36′W

Corcovado (Chubut)
- Municipality and village
- Interactive map of Corcovado (Chubut)
- Country: Argentina
- Province: Chubut Province
- Department: Futaleufú Department

Government
  - Intendant: Héctor Ariel Molina
- Elevation: 1,352 ft (412 m)
- Time zone: UTC−3 (ART)
- Climate: Cfb

Corcovado (Chubut) is a village and municipality in Chubut Province in southern Argentina.
