= Malacara =

Heroic horse in Argentina (c. 1878 – 1909)

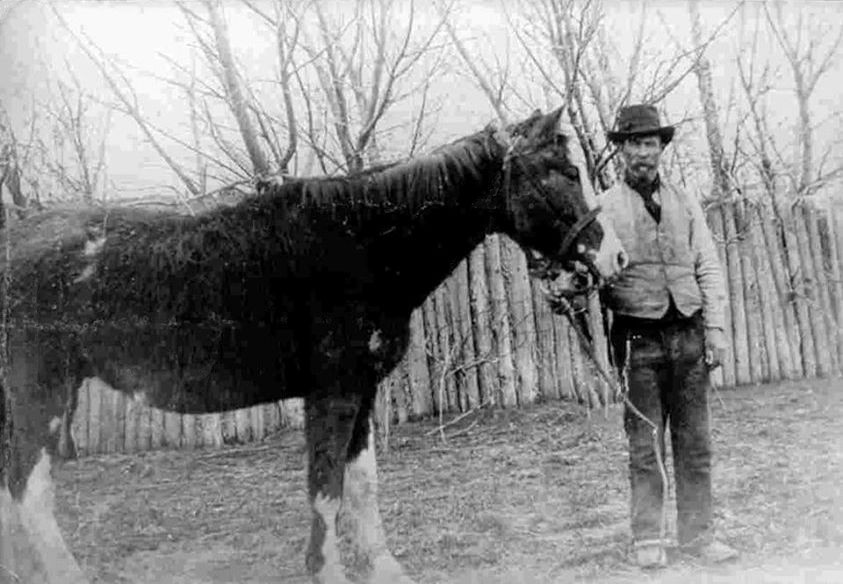
John Daniel Evans and Malacara

Malacara (c. 1878 – 1909) was a horse which gained a place in the history of the Welsh settlement in Patagonia, Argentina, by a daring leap which saved the life of his rider, John Evans, on a trip to explore the upper Chubut valley and the Andes.

John Daniel Evans was three years old when he arrived in Patagonia with the first shipload of Welsh emigrants in 1865. As the colony developed the upper Chubut valley was explored, and John Evans played a prominent part in this, using skills he learnt from the local Tehuelche people. In November 1883 he led a group westwards towards the Andes, looking for gold and exploring. On the way they met an army contingent escorting Tehuelche prisoners to Valcheta, part of one of the last campaigns in the Conquest of the Desert. Some of the group decided to turn back, but four men, led by Evans, continued.

By the end of February 1884 they had reached the river now called Gualjaina, and there they met three members of the tribe led by the cacique Foyel. One of the three, Juan Salvo, knew them, and said that he suspected them to be spies for the army. He tried to take them to Foyel, and when they refused a quarrel resulted. The four explorers decided to head back to the lower Chubut valley, 600 km away, pursued by Foyel's warriors. On 4 March they were ambushed, and Evans's three companions killed. Evans, riding Malacara, took the only way of escape by spurring Malacara towards a precipitous slope into a deep canyon. Malacara made the leap successfully and scrambled up the other side of the canyon. None of Evans's pursuers dared to make the same leap, and the lead he gained while they went round the canyon enabled him to reach safety. Evans continued to explore this area and was a leading figure in the setting up of Welsh settlements here, which in turn led to the area becoming part of Argentina rather than Chile.

Malacara lived on until 1909, dying at the age of 31. Evans buried him at Trevelin in a grave bearing the inscription:

Aquí yacen los restos de mi caballo Malacara que me salvó la vida en el ataque de los indios en el Valle de los Mártires 4-3-84 al regresarme de la cordillera R.I.P. John Daniel Evans.

Spanish for

Here lie the remains of my horse Malacara, who saved my life in the Indian attack in the Valley of the Martyrs 4 March 1884 when returning from the mountains. R.I.P. John Daniel Evans.

Malacara's grave is now one of the tourist attractions of Trevelin.

While not challenging the truth of the story of John Daniel Evans and Malacara, Paul W. Birt remarks that it has the hallmarks of a legendary tale, comparing it to a traditional Welsh tale in which King Arthur escapes from a group of Saxons by riding a horse down a cliff.
