= Blancuntre =

Coordinates: 42°37′14″S 68°54′14″W

- Municipality and village
- Interactive map of Blancuntre
- Country: Argentina
- Province: Chubut Province
- Department: Gastre Department
- Time zone: UTC−3 (ART)
- Climate: BSk

Blancuntre is a village and municipality in Chubut Province in southern Argentina.
