= Lago Rosario =

Coordinates: 43°15′01″S 71°20′56″W

- Municipality and village
- Interactive map of Lago Rosario
- Country: Argentina
- Province: Chubut Province
- Department: Futaleufú Department

Population (2010)
  - Total: 87
- Time zone: UTC−3 (ART)

Lago Rosario is a village and municipality in Chubut Province in southern Argentina.

== History ==
Rosario Lago was the name given to Luis Jorge Fontana, the first governor of the territory of Chubut in 1885, during the exploration of Chubut Riflemen. Its name comes from nearby Lago Rosario.

On April 30, 1902 the inhabitants of the Colony October 16, mostly Welsh, voted for which governments of Argentina and Chile to resolve a conflict of limits within the region.

The first settlers were the families Cheuquehuala and Millahuala. In 1937 the Amaya brothers caused the eviction of the Aboriginal Reserve of Nahuelpan (G. Devera : 1999. Report of Smoke, Trevelin : Municipal Directorate of Culture), about 30 km north of Lake Rosario, where more than 300 people were banished to in 1908. Which resulted in several of these evicted families to migrate to Lake Rosario.
