= Tehuelches Department =

- Departamento Tehuelches
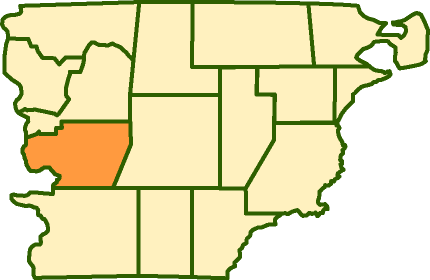
- Coordinates: 44°01′S 70°28′W
- Country: Argentina
- Province: Chubut
- Capital: José de San Martín

Area
  - Total: 14,750 km^{2} (5,700 sq mi)

Population (2008)
  - Total: 5,498
  - Density: 0.35/km^{2} (0.9/sq mi)
- Post Code: U9220

Tehuelches Department is a department of Chubut Province in Argentina.

The provincial subdivision has a total area of 14,750 km^{2}, and its capital city is José de San Martín, which is located around 1,870 km from the Capital federal.

== Demographics ==
According to INDEC estimates for June 2008, the population of the department reached 5,498 inhabitants.

Population evolution of the Tehuelches department according to the different national censuses and intercensal variation in %
	1947	1960	1970	1980	1991	2001	2008
Population	4269	4884	5154	4728	4801	5159	5498
Variation	-	+14.40 %	+5.52 %	−8.26 %	+1.54 %	+7.45 %	+6.57 %

Source: Instituto Nacional de Estadísticas y Censos (INDEC).

== Climate ==
Climate data for Puesto Viejo (modelled data)
Month	Jan	Feb	Mar	Apr	May	Jun	Jul	Aug	Sep	Oct	Nov	Dec	Year
Record high °C (°F)	36.0 (96.8)	35.1 (95.2)	31.7 (89.1)	26.8 (80.2)	20.7 (69.3)	19.1 (66.4)	16.7 (62.1)	21.3 (70.3)	24.2 (75.6)	28.4 (83.1)	30.9 (87.6)	34.8 (94.6)	36.0 (96.8)
Mean daily maximum °C (°F)	18.7 (65.7)	18.5 (65.3)	15.5 (59.9)	10.6 (51.1)	6.4 (43.5)	2.7 (36.9)	2.6 (36.7)	4.6 (40.3)	8.0 (46.4)	11.5 (52.7)	14.5 (58.1)	17.1 (62.8)	10.9 (51.6)
Daily mean °C (°F)	12.0 (53.6)	11.5 (52.7)	8.9 (48.0)	4.3 (39.7)	0.9 (33.6)	−1.8 (28.8)	−2.5 (27.5)	−1.0 (30.2)	1.6 (34.9)	5.1 (41.2)	8.0 (46.4)	10.6 (51.1)	4.8 (40.6)
Mean daily minimum °C (°F)	5.4 (41.7)	5.0 (41.0)	2.8 (37.0)	−0.9 (30.4)	−3.6 (25.5)	−5.6 (21.9)	−6.8 (19.8)	−5.5 (22.1)	−3.5 (25.7)	−0.5 (31.1)	1.8 (35.2)	4.1 (39.4)	−0.6 (30.9)
Record low °C (°F)	−6.4 (20.5)	−5.4 (22.3)	−10.1 (13.8)	−14.4 (6.1)	−29.1 (−20.4)	−36.0 (−32.8)	−32.3 (−26.1)	−29.2 (−20.6)	−23.6 (−10.5)	−11.6 (11.1)	−10.0 (14.0)	−6.0 (21.2)	−36.0 (−32.8)
Average precipitation mm (inches)	29 (1.1)	25 (1.0)	25 (1.0)	23 (0.9)	20 (0.8)	19 (0.7)	19 (0.7)	20 (0.8)	22 (0.9)	27 (1.1)	29 (1.1)	30 (1.2)	343 (13.5)
Source: Climate-Data.org

== Settlements ==
- Gobernador Costa
- José de San Martín
- Río Pico
- Doctor Atilio Oscar Viglione
- Alto Río Pico
- Puesto Viejo
- Putrachoique
- Laguna Blanca
- Arroyo Arenoso
- Aldea Shaman
- Lago Vintter
- Nueva Lubecka
- Rio Frias

== Economy ==
The economic activities carried out are services, but the main economic activity is still sheep farming.

== See also ==
- Departments of Chubut province
