= Río Senguer Department =

- Departamento Río Senguer
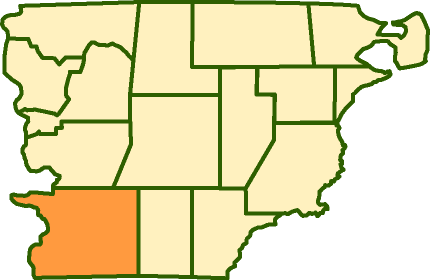
- Coordinates: 45°01′S 70°49′W
- Country: Argentina
- Province: Chubut
- Capital: Alto Río Senguer

Area
  - Total: 22,335 km^{2} (8,624 sq mi)

Population (2001)
  - Total: 6,194
  - Density: 0.3/km^{2} (0.8/sq mi)
- Post Code: U9033
- Website: http://www.riosenguer.gov.ar

Río Senguer Department is a department of Chubut Province in Argentina.

This provincial subdivision has a population of about 6,194 inhabitants in an area of 22,335 km^{2}, and its capital city is Alto Río Senguer, which is located around 2,021 km from the Capital federal.

== Settlements ==
- Aldea Apeleg
- Aldea Beleiro
- Alto Rio Mayo
- Alto Río Senguer
- El Coyte
- Doctor Ricardo Rojas
- Escuadron Rio Mayo
- Facundo
- Lago Blanco
- Paso Moreno
- Pastos Blancos
- La Puerta del Diablo
- Rio Guenguel
- Río Mayo
- Los Tamariscos

== See also ==
- Senguerr River
