= Los Cipreses =

- Village within municipality of Trevelin, Chubut
- Location within Argentina
- Coordinates: 43°11′00″S 71°38′32″W
- Country: Argentina
- Province: Chubut Province
- Department: Futaleufú
- Elevation: 1,120 ft (340 m)
- Time zone: UTC−3 (ART)

Los Cipreses is a village in the municipality of Trevelin in Chubut Province, in southern Argentina.
