= Gastre Department =

- Departamento Gastre
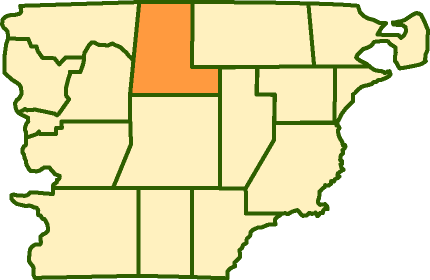
- Coordinates: 42°16′S 69°13′W
- Country: Argentina
- Province: Chubut
- Founded: 1904
- Capital: Gastre

Area
  - Total: 16,335 km^{2} (6,307 sq mi)

Population (2001)
  - Total: 1,508
  - Density: 0.1/km^{2} (0.3/sq mi)
- Post Code: U9121
- Website: http://www.gastre.com.ar/

Gastre Department is a department of Chubut Province in Argentina.

The provincial subdivision has a population of about 1,508 inhabitants in an area of 16,335 km^{2}, and its capital city is Gastre, which is located around 1,713 km from the Capital federal.

== Settlements ==
- Gastre
- Lagunita Salada
- Blancuntre
- El Escorial
- Yala Laubat
- Campamento Los Adobes
- Quechu-Niyeo
- Taquetren
- Colelache
- Sacanana
- Bajada Moreno
