= Colan Conhué =

Coordinates: 43°16′S 69°51′W

- Municipality and village
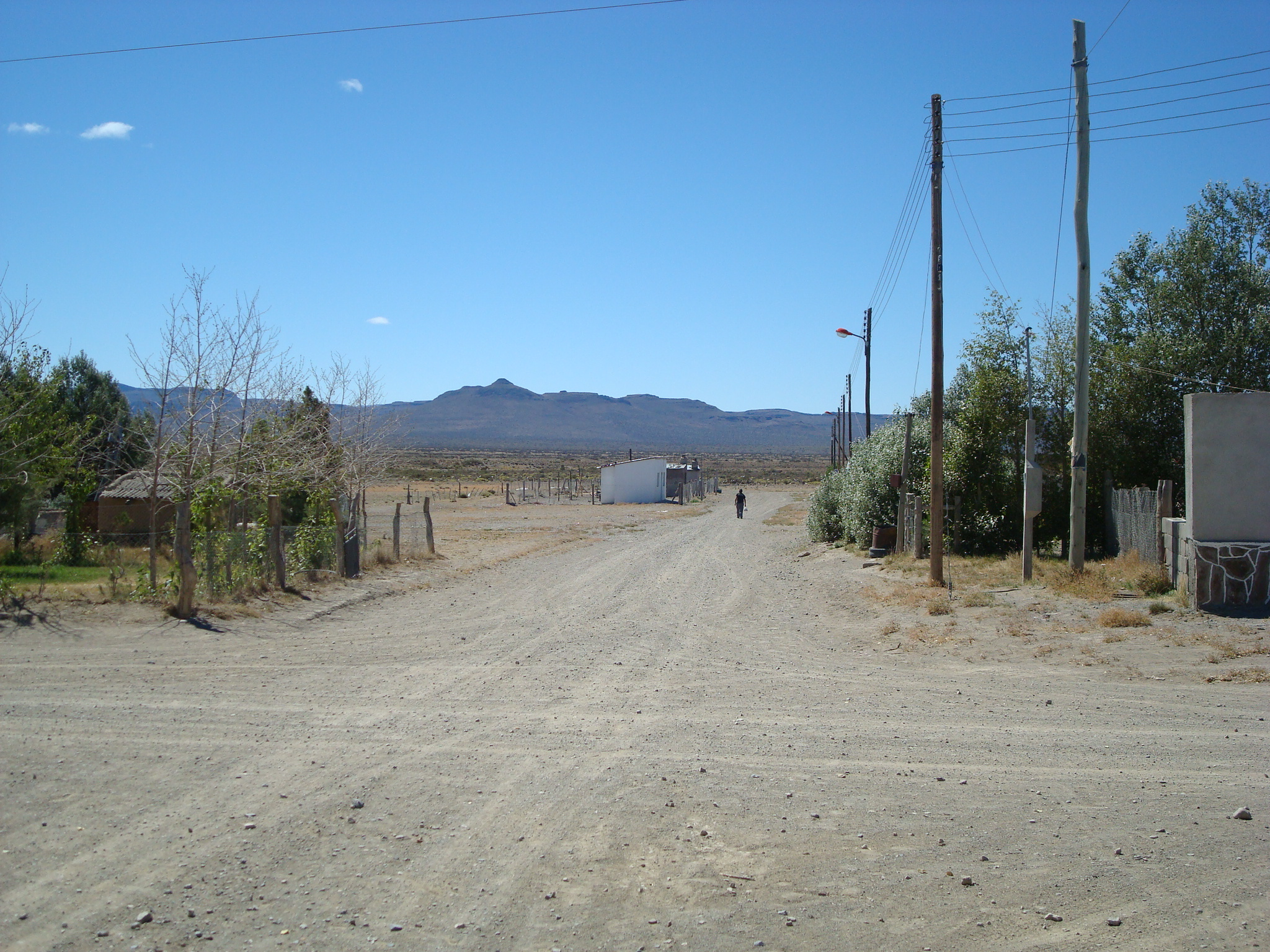
- Interactive map of Colan Conhué
- Country: Argentina
- Province: Chubut Province
- Department: Languiñeo Department
- Time zone: UTC−3 (ART)

Colan Conhué is a village and municipality in Chubut Province in southern Argentina.
