= Telsen Department =

- Departamento Telsen
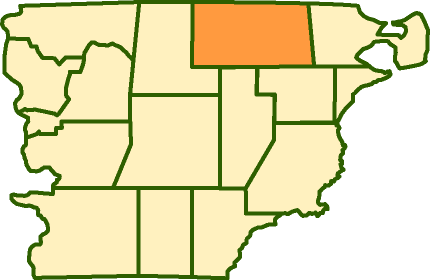
- Coordinates: 42°23′S 66°57′W
- Country: Argentina
- Province: Chubut
- Capital: Telsen

Area
  - Total: 19,893 km^{2} (7,681 sq mi)
- Elevation: 611 m (2,005 ft)

Population (2001)
  - Total: 1,788
  - Density: 0.08/km^{2} (0.21/sq mi)
- Post Code: U9121

Telsen Department is a department of Chubut Province in Argentina.

The provincial subdivision has a population of about 1,788 inhabitants in an area of 19,893 km^{2}, and its capital city is Telsen, which is located around 1,494 km from the Capital federal. It has an elevation of 611 meters.

== Demographics ==
In 2010 the population was 1,644. The population of the department, as of 2022, is 1,681 inhabitants. The gender demographics are 875 males to 748 females. It currently has a population density of 0.08 per square kilometer.

== Settlements ==
- Gan Gan
- Telsen
- Chacay Oeste
- Colonia Agricola Sepaucal
- Tres Banderas
- Laguna Fria
- Bajada del Diablo
- Sierra Chata
- Mallin Grande
