= Quinta El Mirador =

Coordinates: 42°34′20″S 64°16′50″W

- Municipality and village
- Interactive map of Quinta El Mirador
- Country: Argentina
- Province: Chubut Province
- Time zone: UTC−3 (ART)

Quinta El Mirador is a village and municipality in Chubut Province in southern Argentina.
