= Cerro Centinela =

Coordinates: 42°54′S 71°19′W

- Municipality and village
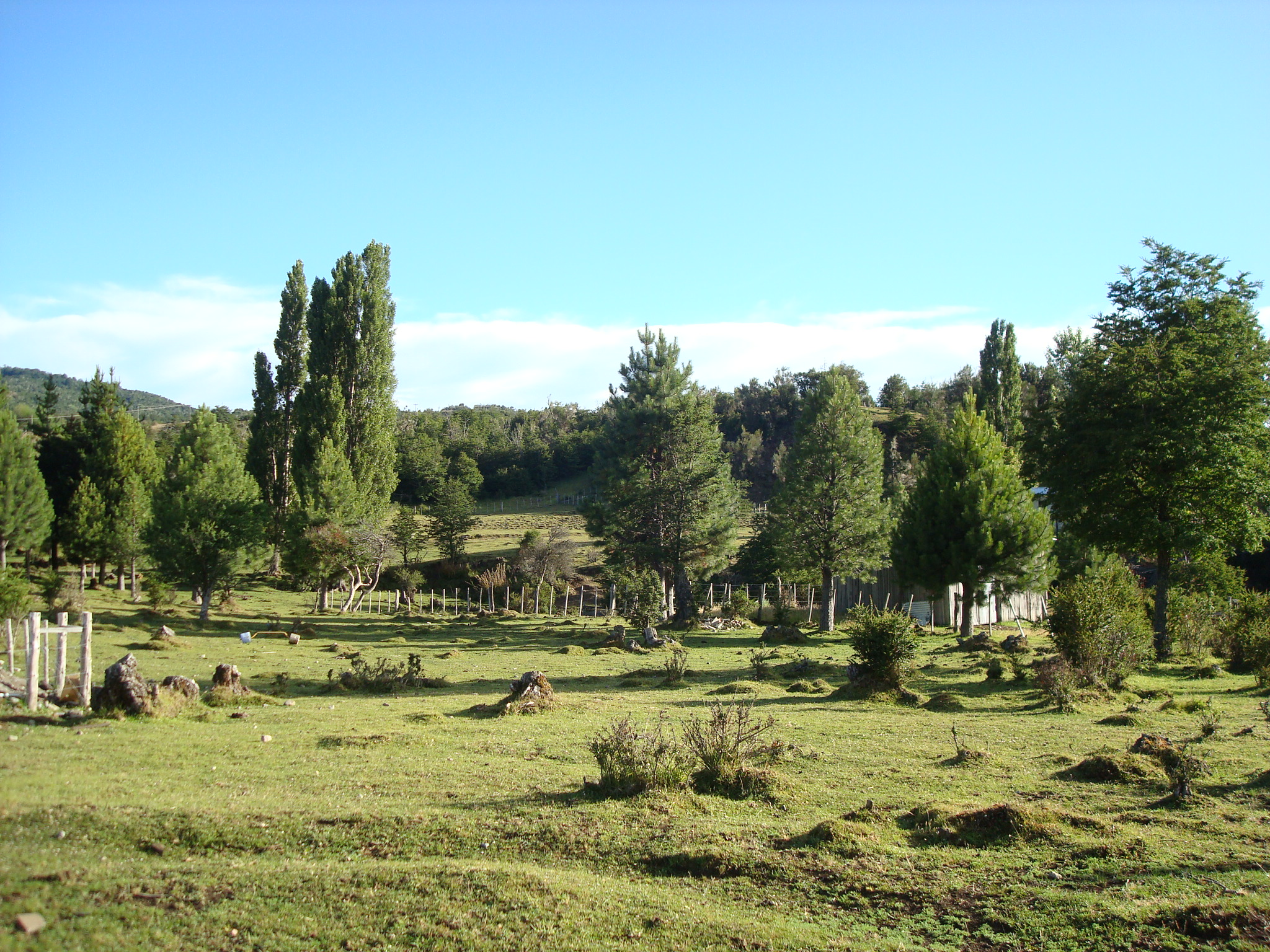
- Interactive map of Cerro Centinela
- Country: Argentina
- Province: Chubut Province
- Department: Futaleufú Department
- Time zone: UTC−3 (ART)
- Climate: Cfb

Cerro Centinela is a village and municipality in Chubut Province in southern Argentina.
