= Alto Río Senguer =

- Town
- Location of Alto Río Senguer in Argentina
- Coordinates: 45°01′S 70°49′W
- Country: Argentina
- Province: Chubut
- Department: Río Senguer

Government
  - Intendant: Miguel López Gutiérrez (PJ)
- Elevation: 715 m (2,346 ft)

Population
  - Total: 1,454
- Time zone: UTC−3 (ART)
- CPA base: U9033
- Dialing code: +54 2945
- Climate: Csc/Dsc
- Website: Official website

Alto Río Senguer, or Alto Río Senguerr, is a town in Chubut Province, Argentina, located along the northern bank of the Senguerr River (the Spanish word for “river” is “rio”). It is the head town of the Río Senguer Department, and was formally founded on September 1, 1943. However, the first permanent dwelling on the site was built around 1915 by a German-born settler, for whom the village used to be named Schultz Pass.

The village of Aldea Apeleg is a few miles north. To the west, the landscape of the Patagonian Andes includes forests, snowy mountains, and lakes including Fontana and La Plata. To the south are extensive plains without trees, called “pampas”. This town is west of National Route 40.

The town receives abundant rain. In summer, the temperature rises to 30 °C (86 °F). Winters are rough, with frosts and snowfall during June, July and August.

The main economic activity has historically been the rearing of sheep, and — to a lesser extent — cattle, with sawmills also operating around town. Tourist attractions include fishing in the nearby lakes (Fontana and La Plata), and the rivers and streams are full of the trout species Salvelinus fontinalis. There are several private preserves for hunting red deer and European wild boar. Other seasonal recreational activities include birdwatching, hiking, and horseback riding. The town has accommodations for tourists.

== Climate ==
Climate data for La Paulina, Río Senguerr (1991-2020)
Month	Jan	Feb	Mar	Apr	May	Jun	Jul	Aug	Sep	Oct	Nov	Dec	Year
Record high °C (°F)	36.0 (96.8)	38.0 (100.4)	33.0 (91.4)	28.0 (82.4)	21.0 (69.8)	17.0 (62.6)	21.0 (69.8)	18.0 (64.4)	24.0 (75.2)	25.0 (77.0)	28.0 (82.4)	34.0 (93.2)	38.0 (100.4)
Mean daily maximum °C (°F)	19.6 (67.3)	19.3 (66.7)	16.5 (61.7)	12.2 (54.0)	8.2 (46.8)	4.6 (40.3)	3.9 (39.0)	6.3 (43.3)	9.3 (48.7)	12.7 (54.9)	15.5 (59.9)	17.9 (64.2)	12.2 (54.0)
Daily mean °C (°F)	13.3 (55.9)	12.7 (54.9)	10.2 (50.4)	6.3 (43.3)	3.3 (37.9)	0.7 (33.3)	−0.2 (31.6)	1.7 (35.1)	3.9 (39.0)	6.8 (44.2)	9.4 (48.9)	11.9 (53.4)	6.7 (44.1)
Mean daily minimum °C (°F)	7.4 (45.3)	6.7 (44.1)	4.8 (40.6)	1.2 (34.2)	−1.0 (30.2)	−3.1 (26.4)	−4.0 (24.8)	−2.5 (27.5)	−0.8 (30.6)	1.4 (34.5)	3.6 (38.5)	6.1 (43.0)	1.7 (35.1)
Record low °C (°F)	−2.0 (28.4)	−3.0 (26.6)	−8.5 (16.7)	−13.0 (8.6)	−20.0 (−4.0)	−18.0 (−0.4)	−30.0 (−22.0)	−17.5 (0.5)	−17.0 (1.4)	−10.0 (14.0)	−9.0 (15.8)	−4.0 (24.8)	−30.0 (−22.0)
Average precipitation mm (inches)	13.1 (0.52)	17.9 (0.70)	21.9 (0.86)	22.6 (0.89)	35.3 (1.39)	32.7 (1.29)	32.4 (1.28)	34.2 (1.35)	19.7 (0.78)	17.5 (0.69)	13.2 (0.52)	9.3 (0.37)	269.8 (10.62)
Source: Red Hidrológica Nacional

Alto Río Senguer has a mediterran influenced continental climate (Dsb) with short, moderately warm, dry summers and cold, somewhat snowy winters.
