= Río Pico, Chubut =

Río Pico
- Location within Argentina
- Coordinates: 44°10′47″S 71°22′09″W
- Country: Argentina
- Province: Chubut Province
- Department: Tehuelches Department

Government
  - Intendant: Diego Pérez

Population (2001)
  - Total: 1,055
- Time zone: UTC−3 (ART)
- Climate: Csb

Río Pico is a town in Tehuelches Department, province of Chubut, Argentina.

The town owes its name to the engineer Octavio Pico Burgess (1837–1892), in honor of his task as an expert in the border conflict between Argentina and Chile.

== Population ==
In 2001 the town had 1,055 inhabitants (INDEC, 2001), representing an increase of 11.3% compared to the 948 inhabitants (INDEC, 1991) in the previous census.

== Climate ==
A weather station in the town worked briefly in 1928. Like nearby Balmaceda, Río Pico has a cold-summer Mediterranean climate (Köppen Csc).

Climate data for Rio Pico in 1928
Month	Jan	Feb	Mar	Apr	May	Jun	Jul	Aug	Sep	Oct	Nov	Dec	Year
Record high °C (°F)	33.6 (92.5)	29.6 (85.3)	21.2 (70.2)	15.9 (60.6)	13.1 (55.6)	10.9 (51.6)	13.0 (55.4)	14.5 (58.1)	22.5 (72.5)	29.6 (85.3)	21.2 (70.2)	23.2 (73.8)	33.6 (92.5)
Mean daily maximum °C (°F)	19.2 (66.6)	20.6 (69.1)	14.0 (57.2)	10.2 (50.4)	8.6 (47.5)	4.4 (39.9)	4.9 (40.8)	7.1 (44.8)	12.1 (53.8)	18.5 (65.3)	14.0 (57.2)	16.3 (61.3)	12.0 (53.6)
Daily mean °C (°F)	11.6 (52.9)	12.7 (54.9)	7.7 (45.9)	4.8 (40.6)	3.0 (37.4)	0.7 (33.3)	0.5 (32.9)	1.8 (35.2)	5.4 (41.7)	10.9 (51.6)	7.7 (45.9)	9.5 (49.1)	7.1 (44.8)
Mean daily minimum °C (°F)	5.4 (41.7)	4.9 (40.8)	2.1 (35.8)	0.6 (33.1)	−2.0 (28.4)	−2.6 (27.3)	−3.9 (25.0)	−2.9 (26.8)	−1.1 (30.0)	4.0 (39.2)	2.1 (35.8)	3.8 (38.8)	3.3 (37.9)
Record low °C (°F)	0.1 (32.2)	0.1 (32.2)	−1.3 (29.7)	−2.7 (27.1)	−5.1 (22.8)	−9.4 (15.1)	−8.8 (16.2)	−7.5 (18.5)	−6.6 (20.1)	−1.0 (30.2)	−1.3 (29.7)	−2.4 (27.7)	−9.4 (15.1)
Average precipitation mm (inches)	17.4 (0.69)	21.3 (0.84)	45.9 (1.81)	66.0 (2.60)	83.6 (3.29)	94.7 (3.73)	60.9 (2.40)	55.2 (2.17)	49.5 (1.95)	21.0 (0.83)	34.2 (1.35)	38.2 (1.50)	587.9 (23.15)
Source: Servicio Meteorológico Nacional
