= Futaleufú Department =

Futaleufú
- Departamento Futaleufú
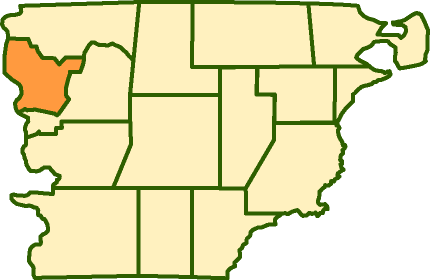
- Coordinates: 42°54′S 71°19′W
- Country: Argentina
- Province: Chubut
- Foundation: February 25, 1906
- Founded by: ?
- Capital: Esquel

Government
  - Mayor: Rafael Williams PJ

Area
  - Total: 9,435 km^{2} (3,643 sq mi)

Population (2001)2001 census [INDEC]
  - Total: 37,540
  - Density: 3.979/km^{2} (10.31/sq mi)
  - Change 1991-2001: +21.95%
- Post Code: U9200
- Area code: 02945
- Resident: ?
- Distance to Buenos Aires: 1,998km
- Distance to Rawson, Chubut: ?
- Patron: ?
- Website: http://www.esquel.gov.ar

Futaleufú (Spanish pronunciation: [futalewˈfu]) is a department in the north west of Chubut Province, Argentina. Its main town and capital is Esquel to the north, with Trevelin and El Corcovado as the only other towns of significant size. Other settlements are Cerro Centinela, Aldea Escolar, Los Cipreses and Lago Rosario. The population of the department is 37,500 inhabitants as per the 2001 census [INDEC], which represents a population density of fewer than 4 inhabitants/km^{2}.

The partido is bordered to the north by the Cushamen Department, to the south and east by the Languiñeo Department and to the west by Chile. The name comes from the Futaleufú River, which originates in the Los Alerces National Park and flows through the department into Chile and on to the Pacific Ocean.

== Settlements ==
- Esquel
- Trevelin
- Corcovado
- Lago Rosario
- Aldea Escolar
- Los Cipreses
- Villa Futalaufquen
- Cerro Centinela
- Nahuel Pan
- Los Tepues
- Barrancas
- Cabaña A. Pescado

== Attractions ==
- La Hoya Ski Resort
- Los Alerces National Park
- La Trochita, historic 1922 narrow gauge railway
