= Mártires Department =

- Departamento Mártires
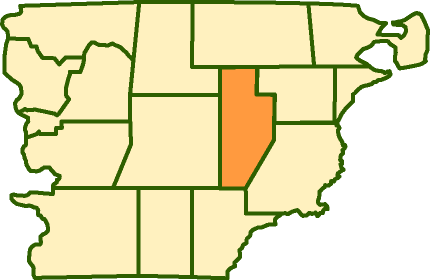
- Coordinates: 43°43′S 67°15′W
- Country: Argentina
- Province: Chubut
- Founded: 1921
- Capital: Las Plumas

Area
  - Total: 15,445 km^{2} (5,963 sq mi)

Population (2001)
  - Total: 977
  - Density: 0.1/km^{2} (0.26/sq mi)
- Post Code: U9101

Mártires Department is a department of Chubut Province in Argentina.

The provincial subdivision has a population of about 977 inhabitants in an area of 15,445 km^{2}.

== Settlements ==
- Las Plumas
- El Mirasol
- Mina Chubut
- La Rosada
- Alto de las Plumas
- Laguna Grande
- Sierra Negra
