= Yala Laubat =

Coordinates: 42°45′35″S 68°51′59″W

- Municipality and village
- Interactive map of Yala Laubat
- Country: Argentina
- Province: Chubut Province
- Department: Gastre Department
- Time zone: UTC−3 (ART)
- Climate: BSk

Yala Laubat is a village and municipality in Chubut Province in southern Argentina.
