= Lago Blanco =

Coordinates: 45°55′S 71°15′W

- Municipality and village
- Interactive map of Lago Blanco
- Country: Argentina
- Province: Chubut Province
- Department: Río Senguer Department
- Time zone: UTC−3 (ART)
- Climate: Csb

Lago Blanco is a village and municipality in Chubut Province in southern Argentina.
