= El Mirasol =

Coordinates: 43°22′S 67°42′W

- Municipality and village
- Interactive map of El Mirasol
- Country: Argentina
- Province: Chubut Province
- Department: Mártires Department
- Time zone: UTC−3 (ART)
- Climate: BWk

El Mirasol is a village and municipality in Chubut Province in southern Argentina.
