= Doctor Atilio Oscar Viglione =

Coordinates: 44°11′30″S 71°39′52″W

- Municipality and village
- Interactive map of Doctor Atilio Oscar Viglione
- Country: Argentina
- Province: Chubut Province
- Department: Tehuelches Department
- Time zone: UTC−3 (ART)
- Climate: Cfb

Doctor Atilio Oscar Viglione is a village and municipality in Chubut Province in southern Argentina.
