= Villa Mirasol =

Coordinates: 36°05′S 63°53′W

Villa Miraso
- Rural locality and village
- Country: Argentina
- Province: La Pampa
- Established: August 3, 1906
- Time zone: UTC−3 (ART)
- Postal code: 6315
- Area code: 02333

For the historic building in France, see Villa Mirasol (Les Sables d'Olonne).

Villa Miraso is a village and rural locality (municipality) in La Pampa Province in Argentina.
