= Telsen =

- Village
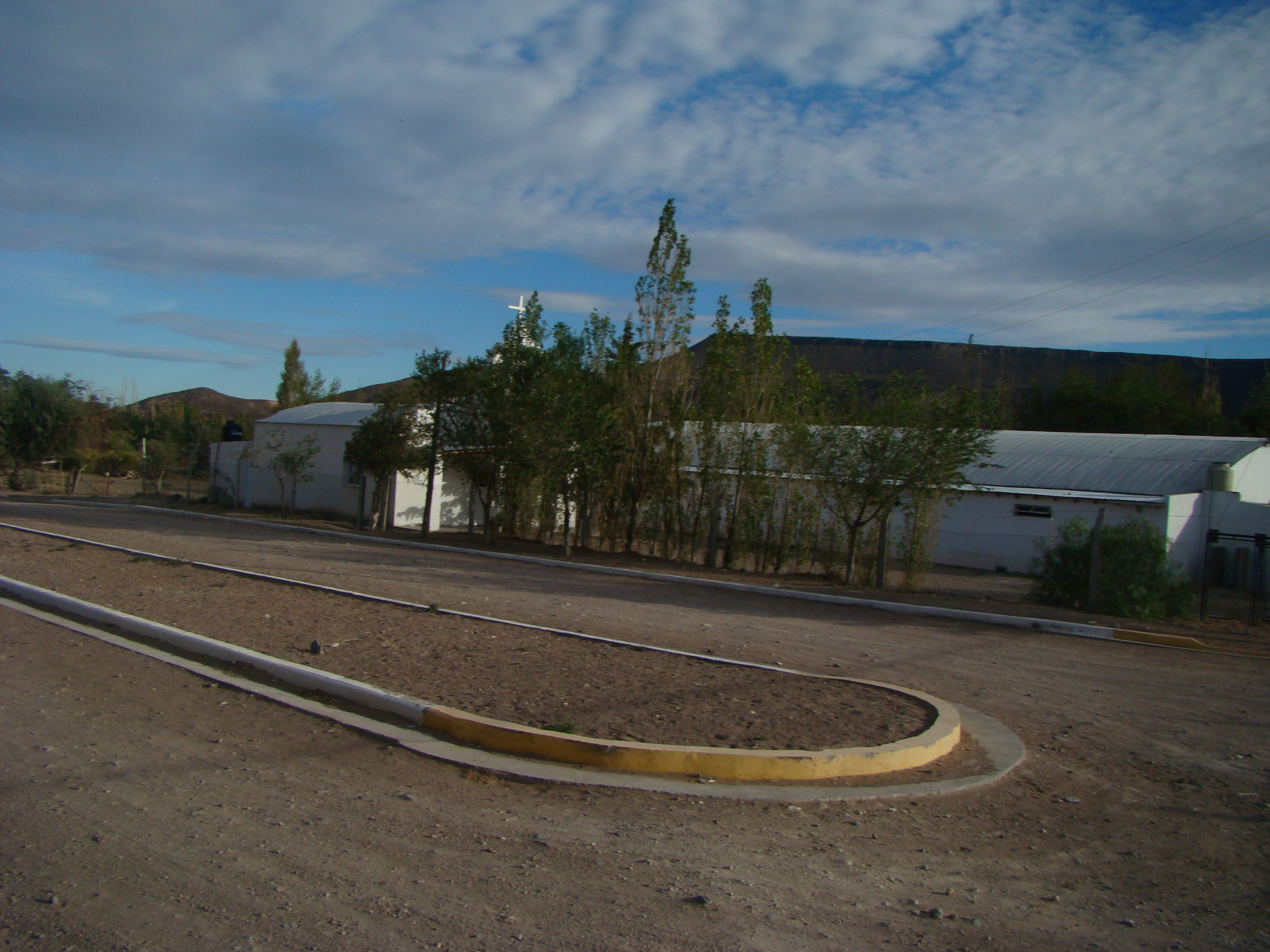

- Location of Telsen in Argentina
- Coordinates: 42°23′S 66°57′W
- Country: Argentina
- Province: Chubut
- Department: Telsen
- Elevation: 634 m (2,080 ft)

Population
  - Total: 486
- Time zone: UTC−3 (ART)
- CPA base: U9121
- Dialing code: +54 2965
- Climate: BWk

Telsen is a village in Chubut Province, Argentina. It is the head town of the Telsen Department located 241 km west of the provincial capital Rawson. It was founded on December 9, 1898 by John Marley.
