= Theresa Viglione =

Theresa Viglione was an Italian and South African woman famous for saving the lives of many Voortrekkers in 1838 when she warned a group of them of an impending attack initiated by Zulu king Dingane. She is immortalized on a frieze in a Voortrekker monument in Pretoria, South Africa

== Biography ==
Born to an Italian family originally from Piedmont, Theresa Viglione moved to South Africa with her family in the early 19th century. Her family is believed to have belonged to the Valdese congregation, a Protestant church in western Piedmont, whose members were forced to flee Piedmont—then part of the Kingdom of Sardinia —because of discrimination against Protestants by the local authorities.

== Background ==
On February 6, 1838, a group of Voortrekkers and their servants went to negotiate with the Zulu king Dingane. The party was led by Piet Retief, an Afrikaner leader. The king received Retief and his group at his cattle-kraal, and they began to discuss a treaty amending a previous treaty signed in January 1836. Initially he was obstructive about drawing up the treaty, but eventually he signed it. He invited the Voortrekkers to share some sourgbeer with him. The trekkers left their muskets outside, entered the kraal and sat at the King’s feet. While beer was served the surrounding warriors began to dance and shout. The King leapt to his feet and yelled ”buladani abatagati!” (“Kill the wizards!”). The Voortrekkers were taken to be executed. They were impaled and their bodies left on a hillside to be eaten by wild animals, as was Dingane's custom with his enemies. Piet Retief was the last to be killed. Dingane gave orders for the Voortrekker laagers to be attacked, which would have plunged the migrant movement into disarray.

The Zulus headed towards Natal to annihilate the rest of the Voortrekkers, who were encamped in the countryside watered by the rivers Bloukrans, Bushman and Mooi streams. Gerrit Maritz, the acting commander in Retief’s absence, was near Bushman's River. The Zulus, with a total strength of about three regiments, almost killed all of the Lieberberg, Prinsloo, Botha, and Bezuidenhouts laagers. A band of Italian traders were encamped not far from the laagers, where many women and children were killed. Theresa Viglione was one of them. When she saw what was happening, she jumped on a horse and rode off to Bushmans River to Maritz' camp and warned everyone there, allowing them to defend themselves.

== Sources ==
- References A Short History of South Africa, by John Selby, pages 91–96: Classic in Post-Colonial Worlds, by Lorna Hardwick and Carol Gillespie, page 153.
