= Doctor Ricardo Rojas =

Coordinates: 45°34′S 71°04′W

- Municipality and village
- Interactive map of Doctor Ricardo Rojas
- Country: Argentina
- Province: Chubut Province
- Department: Río Senguer Department
- Elevation: 1,831 ft (558 m)
- Time zone: UTC−3 (ART)
- Climate: Csb

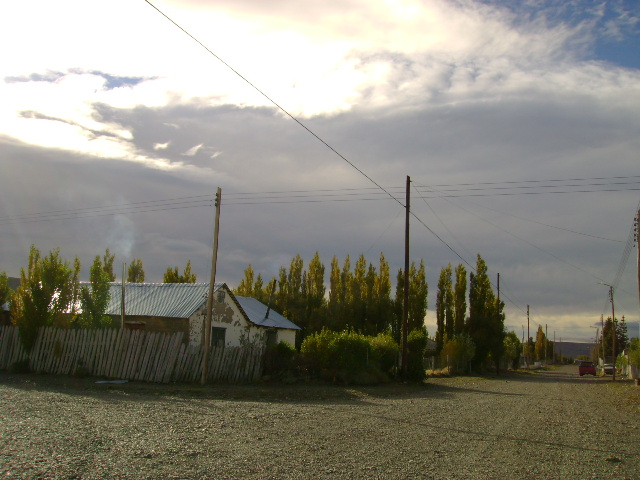
Ricardo Rojas village

Doctor Ricardo Rojas is a village and municipality in Chubut Province in southern Argentina.
