= José de San Martín, Chubut =

José de San Martín
- Town
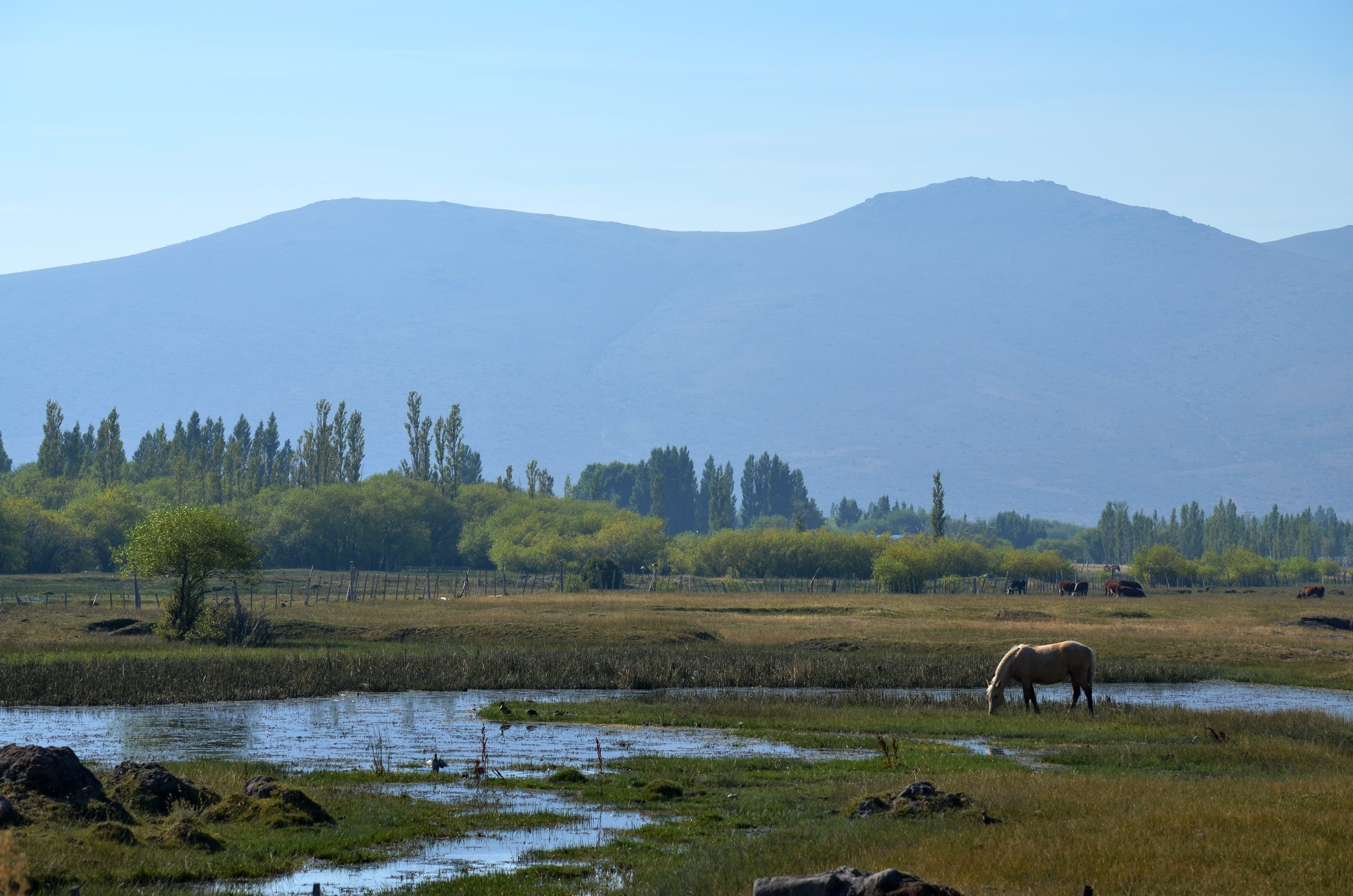

- Location of José de San Martín in Argentina
- Coordinates: 44°01′S 70°28′W
- Country: Argentina
- Province: Chubut
- Department: Tehuelches

Government
  - Intendant: Rubén Osvaldo Calpanchay
- Elevation: 740 m (2,430 ft)

Population
  - Total: 1,453
- Time zone: UTC−3 (ART)
- CPA base: U9220
- Dialing code: +54 2945
- Climate: BWk

José de San Martín is a town in Chubut Province, Argentina. It is the head town of the Tehuelches Department.

The town is named after José de San Martín, the Argentine General who liberated Argentina from the Spanish empire.
