= Aldea Beleiro =

Coordinates: 45°33′10″S 71°31′18″W

- Municipality and village
- Interactive map of Aldea Beleiro
- Country: Argentina
- Province: Chubut Province
- Department: Río Senguer Department

Government
  - Intendant: Patricia Verónica Tapia
- Time zone: UTC−3 (ART)
- Climate: Csc

Aldea Beleiro is a village and municipality in Chubut Province in southern Argentina.
