= Las Plumas =

- Village
- Location of Las Plumas in Argentina
- Coordinates: 43°43′S 67°15′W
- Country: Argentina
- Province: Chubut
- Department: Mártires
- Elevation: 280 m (920 ft)

Population
  - Total: 605
- Demonym: Plumense
- Time zone: UTC−3 (ART)
- CPA base: U9101
- Dialing code: +54 2965
- Climate: BWk

Las Plumas (Welsh: Dôl y Plu) is a village in Chubut Province, Argentina. Located in the valle de los Mártires, it is the head town of the Mártires Department. It was established in 1921, and from 1928 to 1961 the main station of the Central Chubut Railway, Estación Alto de Las Plumas, was in use in the village.
