= Villa Mirasol (Les Sables d'Olonne) =

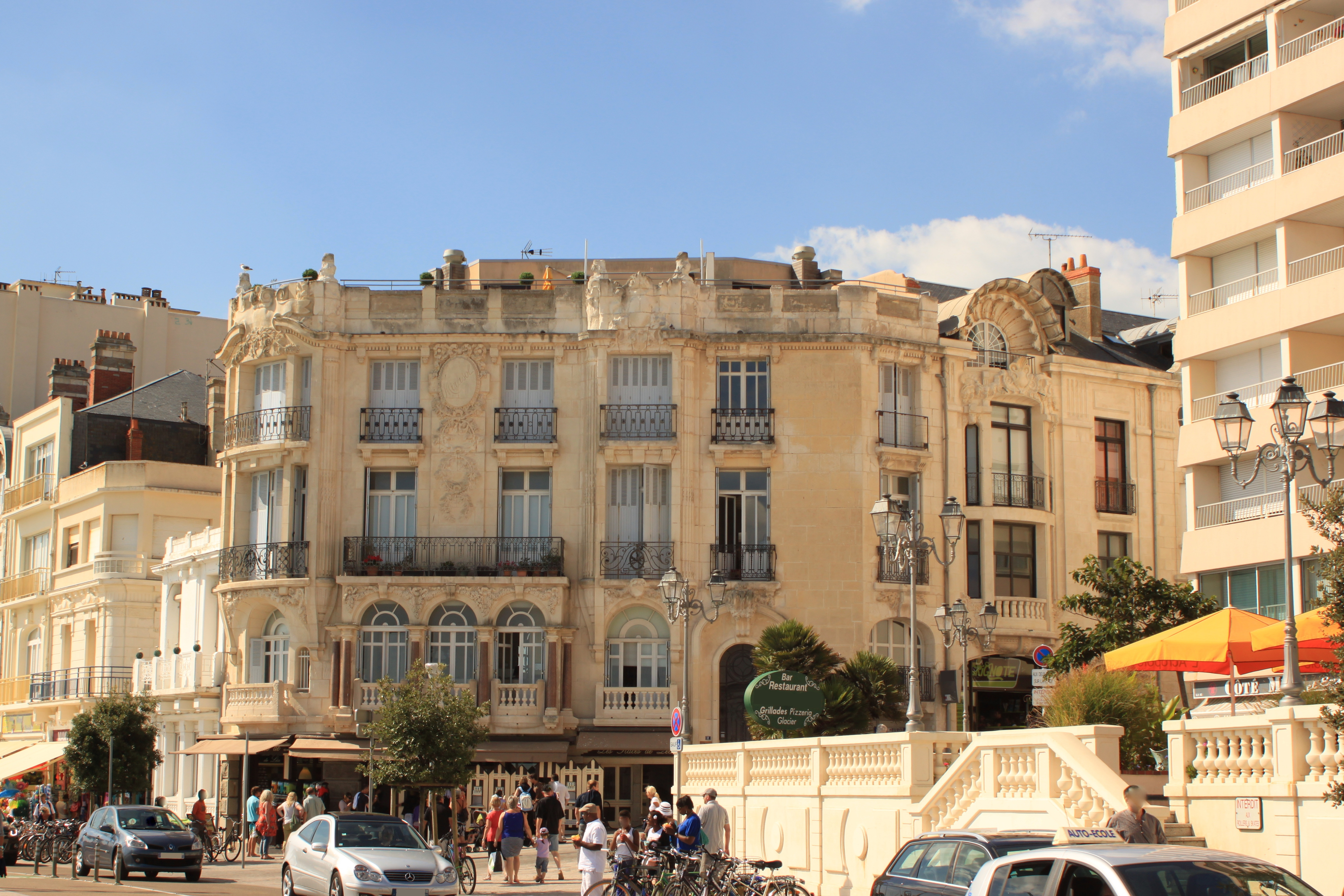
- The Villa Mirasol in 2012
- Interactive map of the Villa Mirasol area

General information
- Type: Residential building
- Location: 1, 3, 5, 7 place du Maréchal Foch and 4, 4 bis rue Travot, Les Sables-d'Olonne, France
- Coordinates: 46°29′42″N 1°47′03″W
- Completed: 1914

Design and construction
- Architect: Maurice Durand

For the village in Argentina, see Villa Mirasol.

The Villa Mirasol is a historic residential building in Les Sables d'Olonne, Vendée, France.

== History ==
It was built in 1914, and designed by architect Maurice Durand. It was built by Félix Gault on a former cemetery for Léon Herbert, a wealthy landowner.

The ground floor came with a tearoom and a smoking room while the first floor came with a large bedroom looking out to the Atlantic Ocean. Sculptor Maurice Legendre designed the facade. The main entrance was on the Place du Maréchal Foch, but the maids used the door on the Rue Travot.

The building has been listed as an official historical monument by the French Ministry of Culture since 1975. The facade was restored in 1995.
