= Gastre =

- Village
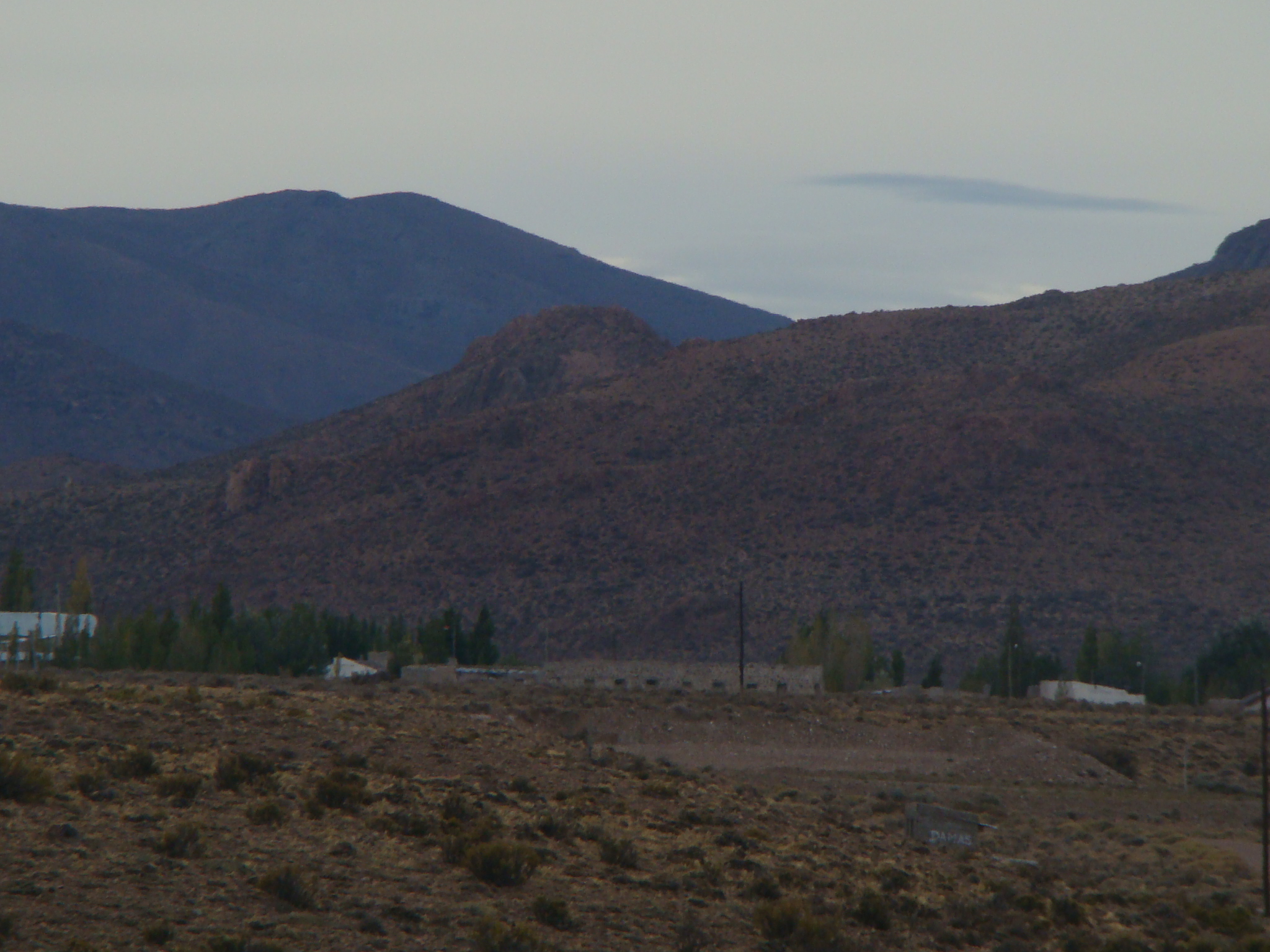
- Entrance to Gastre

- Location of Gastre in Argentina
- Coordinates: 42°16′S 69°13′W
- Country: Argentina
- Province: Chubut
- Department: Gastre
- Elevation: 1,208 m (3,963 ft)

Population
  - Total: 557
- Time zone: UTC−3 (ART)
- CPA base: U9121
- Dialing code: +54 2965
- Climate: BSk

Gastre (from Tehuelche Gástrrek, meaning "shrub") is a village in Chubut Province, Argentina. It is the head town of the Gastre Department. It was founded in 1904. The place was the center of a controversy in the early 1990s when Argentina's National Atomic Energy Commission proposed to build a deep borehole disposal in the area. It was intended for radioactive waste to stay in the area for "1,000 years" until the radiation reached a non-lethal level.
