= Aldea Apeleg =

Coordinates: 44°41′S 70°51′W

- Municipality and village
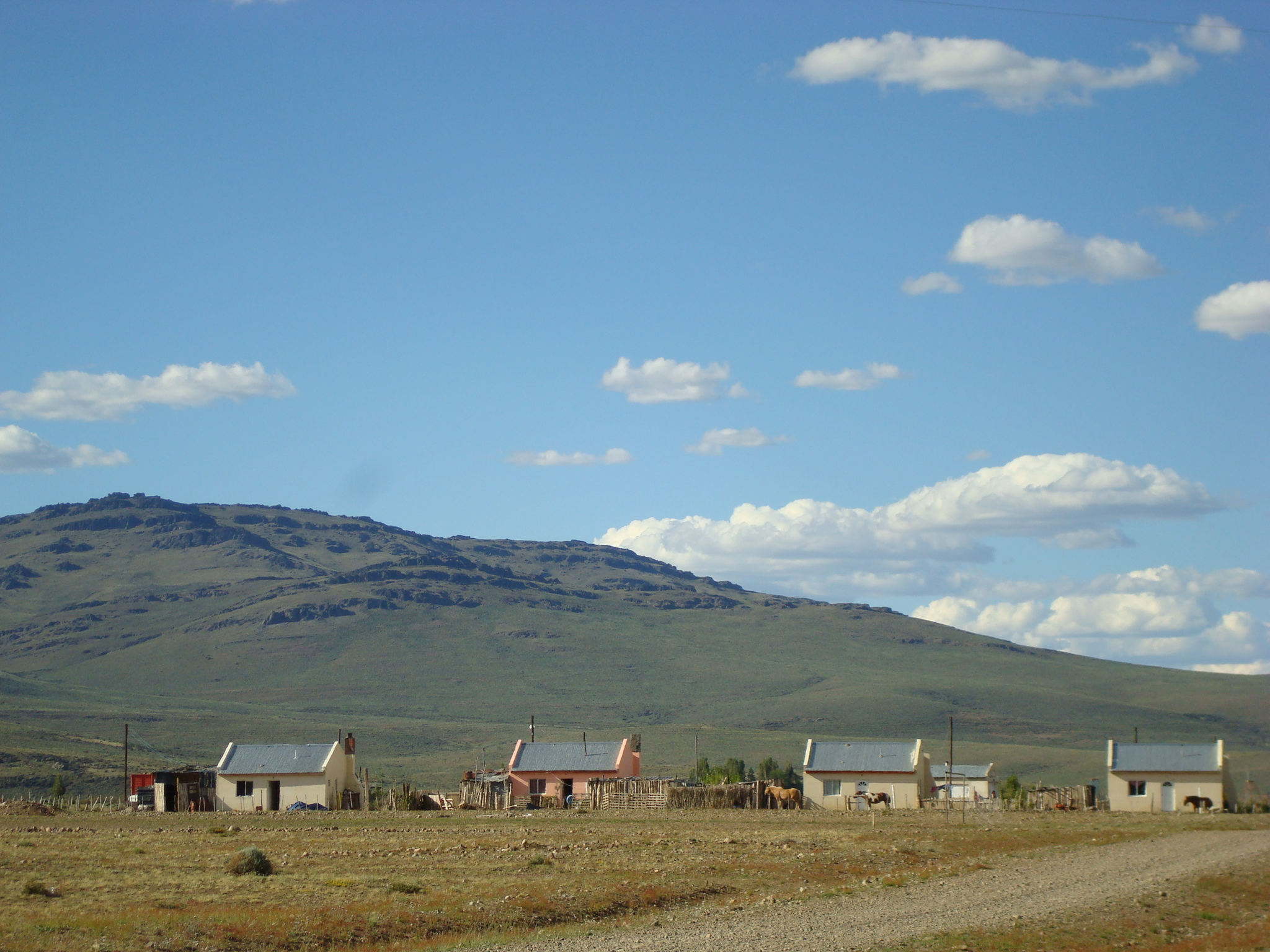
- Aldea Apeleg
- Interactive map of Aldea Apeleg
- Country: Argentina
- Province: Chubut Province
- Department: Río Senguer Department
- Region: San Jorge Gulf Basin
- Elevation: 2,677 ft (816 m)
- Time zone: UTC−3 (ART)
- Postal code: 9033
- Area code: 02945 497-XXX
- Climate: Csb

Aldea Apeleg is a village and rural municipality that is located in the southwest of the Chubut Province in southern Argentina. According to the Argentine National Institute of Statistics and Census (INDEC), as of 2010 Aldea Apeleg had 126 inhabitants, a 2.3% increase since the 2001 census where 119 inhabitants were recorded.
