= Arroyo Verde Creek =

Coordinates: 11°25′S 66°20′W

Location
- Country: Bolivia

Arroyo Verde is a creek of Bolivia.

== See also ==
- List of rivers of Bolivia
