= Trevelin =

Trevelin Trefelin
- Town
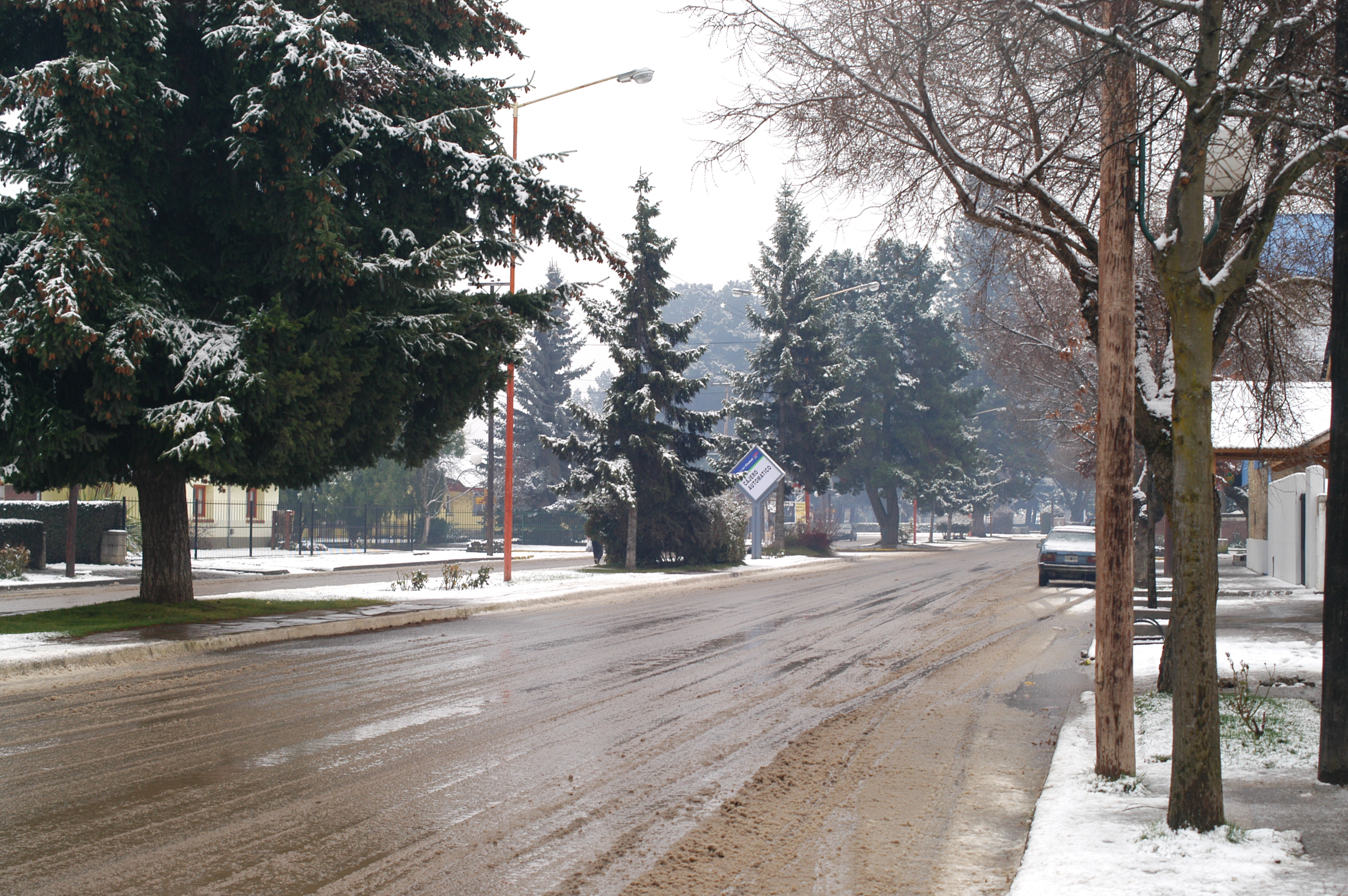
- A winter day in Trevelin

- Location of Trevelin in Argentina
- Coordinates: 43°5′S 71°28′W
- Country: Argentina
- Province: Chubut
- Department: Futaleufú

Government
  - Intendant: Héctor Ingram
- Elevation: 385 m (1,263 ft)

Population (2011)
  - Total: 9,123
- Time zone: UTC−3 (ART)
- CPA base: U9203
- Dialing code: +54 2945
- Climate: Csb
- Website: www.trevelin.gob.ar

Trevelin (Spanish pronunciation: [tɾeˈβelin]; Welsh: Trefelin [tɾɛˈvɛlɪn]) is a town in the western part of the Patagonian Argentine province of Chubut. The town lies on the eastern banks of the Percy River (Spanish: Río Percey). It is located in the department of Futaleufú, 22 kilometres (14 mi) south of Esquel, and had 6,395 inhabitants at the time of the 2001 census [INDEC] and 7,908 inhabitants in the 2010 census [INDEC].

== History ==
The town was important in the Welsh settlement of Chubut. It was named Trevelin (from Trefelin, the Welsh for "mill town") after the first flour mill, known as "Los Andes", was established there by John Daniel Evans in 1891. Evans had previously become well known for leading expeditions into the Pampas in search of new lands and mineral reserves, which had earned him the nickname 'El Baqueano' (meaning guide or scout).

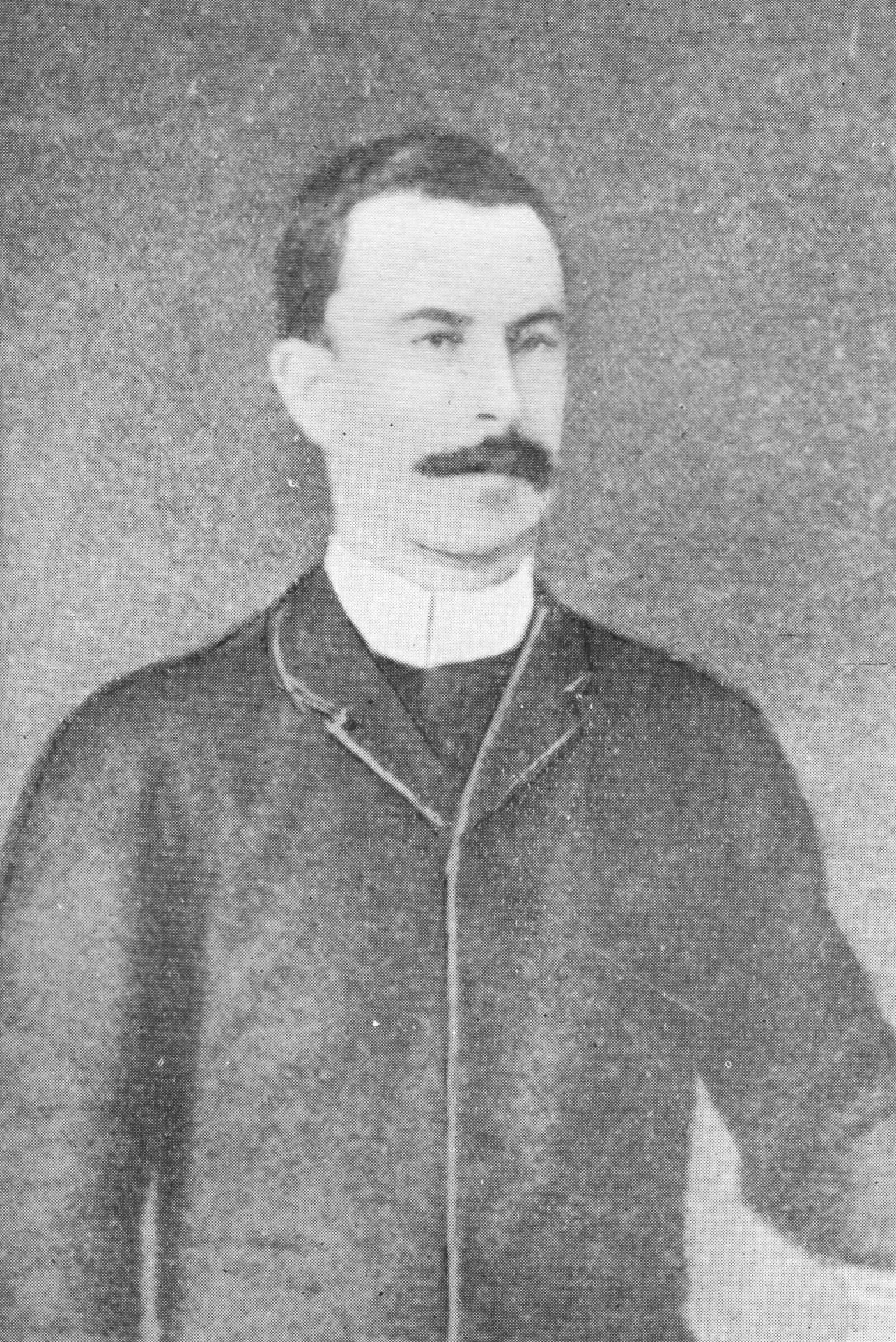
John Daniel Evans

One of the tourist attractions of Trevelín is the grave of Malacara, Evans' horse, who a few years earlier in 1884 had saved his master's life by escaping down a steep ravine when his travelling party was attacked by a group of indigenous people led by Cacique (chief) Foyel. The three other Welshmen with whom he was travelling (Richard Davies, John Hughes and John Parry) were killed and buried nearby at a place now known as 'Dyffryn y Merthyron' or The Valley of the Martyrs.

Following a territorial dispute between Argentina and Chile in early 1902, the Limits Commission met in School No.18, Trevelin on 30 April of that year. The British arbiter was Sir Thomas Holdich (King's Surveyor General of India) whilst the interested parties were represented by Francisco Pascasio Moreno (Argentina) and Dr. Balmaceda (Chile). The inhabitants of the area (both the indigenous Mapuche Tehuelche and the Welsh colonists) voted to remain in Argentina.

The town, in the Valley of the 16th of October (Welsh: Cwm Hyfryd/Bro Hydref), is near the Percy River, which flows south into the Río Grande, crosses the frontier with Chile, and thereafter is known as the Río Futaleufú. The Percy River was named after Percy Wharton, an American who was settled in Cwm Hyfryd between 1885 and 1904 before returning to Los Angeles, USA.

A replica of John Evans' Los Andes Flour Mill can be found today at the Nant Fach Museum, Trevelin, in an area known as Comarca de los Alerces. The decline of the flour milling industry in the area can be dated to 1949 when the government of Juan Perón declared that the Chubut region was not appropriate for the cultivation of wheat, and therefore the land was turned over to the rearing of cattle.

== Events ==
Trevelin first held an eisteddfod in 1922, which became an annual two-day event in 1977. It takes place partly in Spanish and partly in Welsh. In May 2025, of the two main literary prizes, the Chair was won by Lois Medi Wiliam from Gwynedd, Wales and the Crown was won by Noe Sánchez Jenkins, a local teacher at Ysgol y Cwm, Trevelin.

== Climate ==
Trevelin has a temperate oceanic climate (Köppen Cfb), but with a rainfall pattern similar to the Mediterranean climate (Köppen Csb). The climate is milder than that of other locations on the Argentine side of Northern Patagonia because of the low altitude and the direct exposure to Pacific winds. This microclimate allows for intensive agriculture, a rarity in the region where mid-summer frosts occur every year. Nighttime temperatures rarely drop below −10 °C (14 °F) and although snowfall is frequent, it does not cover the ground for long periods of time. Winters are stormy with frequent rain, sleet and snow while summers are cool, windy and relatively dry.

Mean annual precipitation is 632 mm (25 in). The precipitation pattern resembles a Mediterranean one, where most (75%) of the precipitation is concentrated from April to August, the cooler months with a dry period from September to March. Snowfall can occur during the colder months while rainfall predominates in warmer months; hail rarely occurs.

The mean temperature in Trevelin ranges from 3.8 °C (39 °F) in July, the coldest month to 16.1 °C (61 °F) in January, the warmest month. Frosts can occur at any time, even in summer, which limits the range of agricultural activities.

Climate data for Trevelin (1970–2009)
Month	Jan	Feb	Mar	Apr	May	Jun	Jul	Aug	Sep	Oct	Nov	Dec	Year
Record high °C (°F)	37 (99)	38 (100)	35 (95)	27 (81)	22 (72)	18 (64)	20 (68)	21 (70)	25 (77)	29 (84)	33 (91)	36 (97)	38 (100)
Mean daily maximum °C (°F)	24 (75)	24 (75)	21 (70)	16 (61)	11 (52)	8 (46)	7 (45)	10 (50)	14 (57)	17 (63)	20 (68)	22 (72)	16 (61)
Daily mean °C (°F)	16 (61)	16 (61)	13 (55)	9 (48)	6 (43)	4 (39)	3 (37)	5 (41)	8 (46)	10 (50)	12 (54)	14 (57)	10 (50)
Mean daily minimum °C (°F)	8 (46)	8 (46)	5 (41)	3 (37)	1 (34)	0 (32)	−1 (30)	0 (32)	1 (34)	3 (37)	5 (41)	7 (45)	3 (37)
Record low °C (°F)	−2 (28)	−2 (28)	−4 (25)	−7 (19)	−13 (9)	−13 (9)	−15 (5)	−13 (9)	−9 (16)	−9 (16)	−5 (23)	−3 (27)	−15 (5)
Average precipitation mm (inches)	47 (1.9)	35 (1.4)	55 (2.2)	81 (3.2)	156 (6.1)	155 (6.1)	150 (5.9)	121 (4.8)	72 (2.8)	61 (2.4)	54 (2.1)	45 (1.8)	1,032 (40.6)
Average relative humidity (%)	64	58	60	65	76	79	77	71	64	61	57	58	66
Source: Instituto Nacional de Tecnología Agropecuaria
