= El Escorial, Chubut =

Coordinates: 43°10′S 68°25′W

El Escorial
- Municipality and village
- Interactive map of El Escorial
- Country: Argentina
- Province: Chubut Province
- Department: Gastre Department
- Time zone: UTC−3 (ART)
- Climate: BSk

El Escorial is a village in Chubut Province in southern Argentina.
