= Chubut Province =

Province of southern Argentina

Coordinates: 43°18′S 65°06′W

Chubut Province Provincia del Chubut (Spanish) Talaith Chubut (Welsh)
- Province
- Province of Chubut
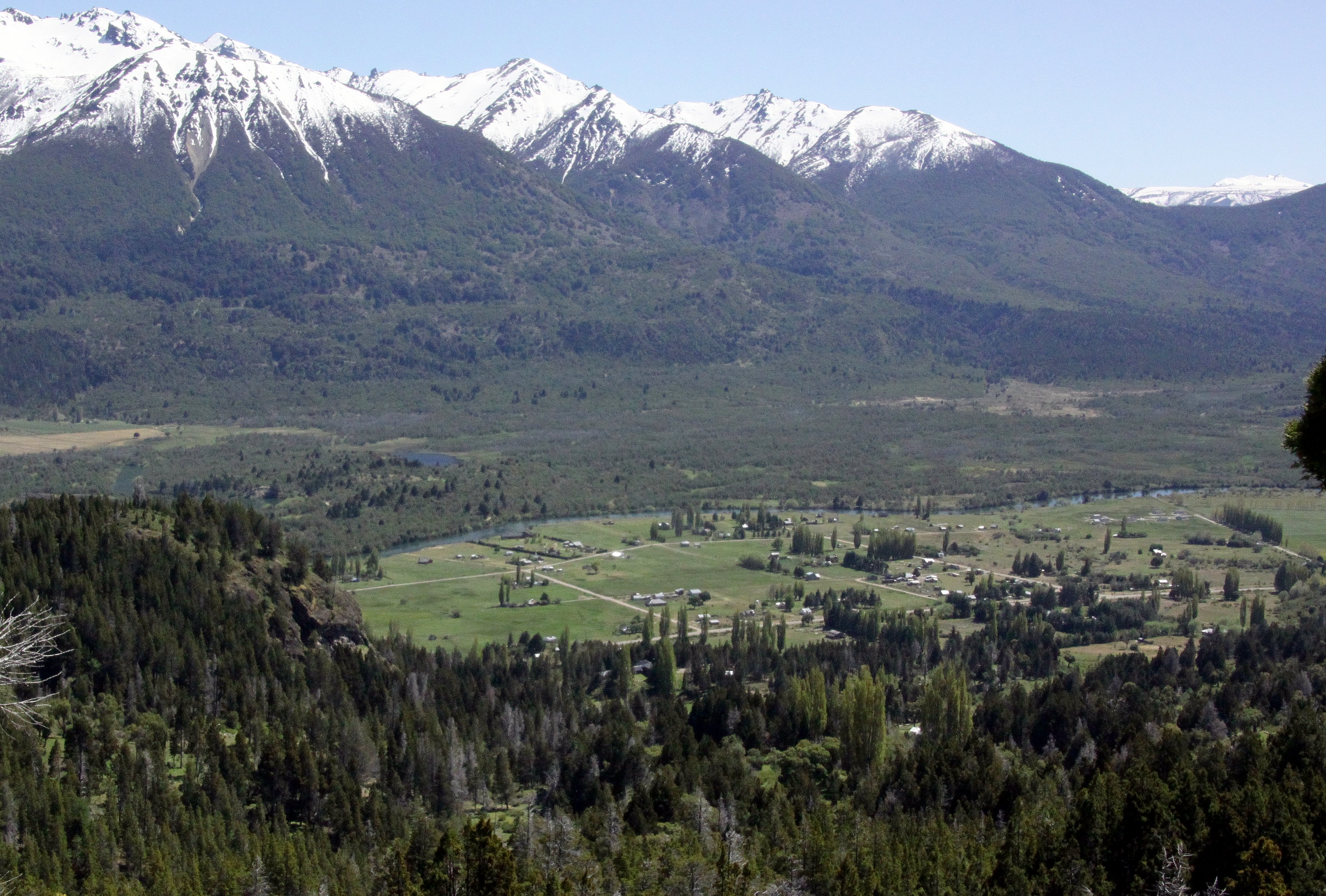
- Villa Lago Rivadavia and the Andes

- Flag Coat of arms
- Motto: "Ni muerte ni esclavitud. Solo patria y libertad" (Spanish) "Na marwolaeth na caethwasiaeth. Dim ond mamwlad a rhyddid" (Welsh) "Neither death nor slavery. Only motherland and freedom"
- Location of Chubut within Argentina
- Country: Argentina
- Capital: Rawson
- Departments: 15
- Municipalities and communes: 47

Government
  - Governor: Ignacio Torres (PRO)
  - Vice Governor: Gustavo Menna (UCR)
  - Legislature: 27
  - National Deputies: 5
  - National Senators: Carlos Linares (FDT); Edith Terenzi (JXC); Andrea Cristina (JXC)

Area Ranked 3rd
  - Total: 224,686 km^{2} (86,752 sq mi)

Population (2022 census)
  - Total: 592,621
  - Rank: 18th
  - Density: 2.63755/km^{2} (6.83123/sq mi)
- Demonym: Chubutense

GDP
  - Total: US$ 7.2 billion
  - Per capita: US$ 11,500
- Time zone: UTC−3 (ART)
- ISO 3166 code: AR-U
- Languages: Spanish (official); Welsh (co-official)
- HDI (2021): 0.858 very high (3rd)
- Website: www.chubut.gov.ar

Chubut (Spanish: Provincia del Chubut [tʃuˈβut] – from Tehuelche chupat 'transparent'; Welsh: Talaith Chubut [taˈlaɪθ ˈχɨbɨt]) is a province in southern Argentina, situated between the 42nd parallel south (the border with Río Negro Province), the 46th parallel south (bordering Santa Cruz Province), the Andes range to the west (bordering Chile), and the Atlantic Ocean to the east. The province's name derives from the Tehuelche word chupat, meaning 'transparent', its description of the Chubut River.

The largest city is Comodoro Rivadavia in the south of the province; it had 199,369 inhabitants at the 2022 Census. The administrative capital is Rawson (27,157). Other important cities are Puerto Madryn (97,625), Trelew (104,657), Esquel (36,624) and Sarmiento (13,892). Gaiman (6,376) is a cultural and demographic centre of the region known as Y Wladfa in which Welsh-Argentines are concentrated.

== History ==
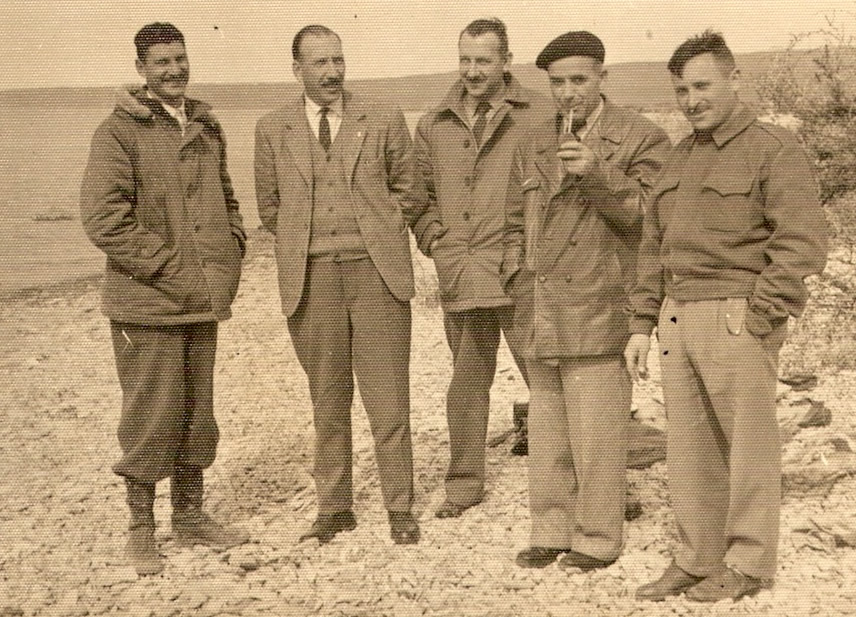
Argentine Geological Society founder Victorio Angelelli (second from right), c. 1950, whose study of Chubut's mineral wealth identified resources for economic development.

Before the Spaniards arrived in the Americas, nomadic indigenous Tehuelche people had inhabited the Patagonia region for thousands of years. They lived as hunter-gatherers and covered territory in seasonal cycles as they followed game.

In the 17th and 18th centuries, Spanish missionaries came to the area, and founded the San José Fort on Península Valdés. The indigenous people later destroyed it.

In 1865, Welsh people came to Chubut on the Mimosa and settled in the Chubut Valley. The region was disputed between Chile and Argentina until 1881. Chile renounced its claim in order to prevent Argentina from entering into the War of the Pacific, in which it was already fighting against Peru and Bolivia.

As part of the Conquista del Desierto (Conquest of the Desert), Argentina organized the National Territory of Chubut in 1884, after the last indigenous cacique, Inacayal, surrendered to government forces. Luis Fontana was named governor. At the beginning of the 20th century, after the Boer War, some Boer people settled in the town of Sarmiento and in lesser number in other nearby towns.

From 1895 to 1915 hundreds of Spanish- and Italian-born immigrants settled in the lower Chubut valley as well a little more than hundred Chileans.

In 1944, the southern part of Chubut and northern part of Santa Cruz were designated the Comodoro Rivadavia Military Zone. The zone was dissolved in 1955, and Chubut was declared a province. Studies in the 1950s revealed mineral wealth in the province, which the government has tried to develop.

Population shifts of the late 20th century, especially from Buenos Aires, raised the population steadily from 190,000 (1970) to 357,189 (1991), to 413,237 (2001), to 509,108 (2010) and to 592,621 (2022). The government has encouraged people to resettle here. Most of the inhabitants are in the main cities. They have also settled along the Chubut River. Most areas have a population density of less than 1 inhabitant per square kilometer.

== Geography ==
=== Relief ===
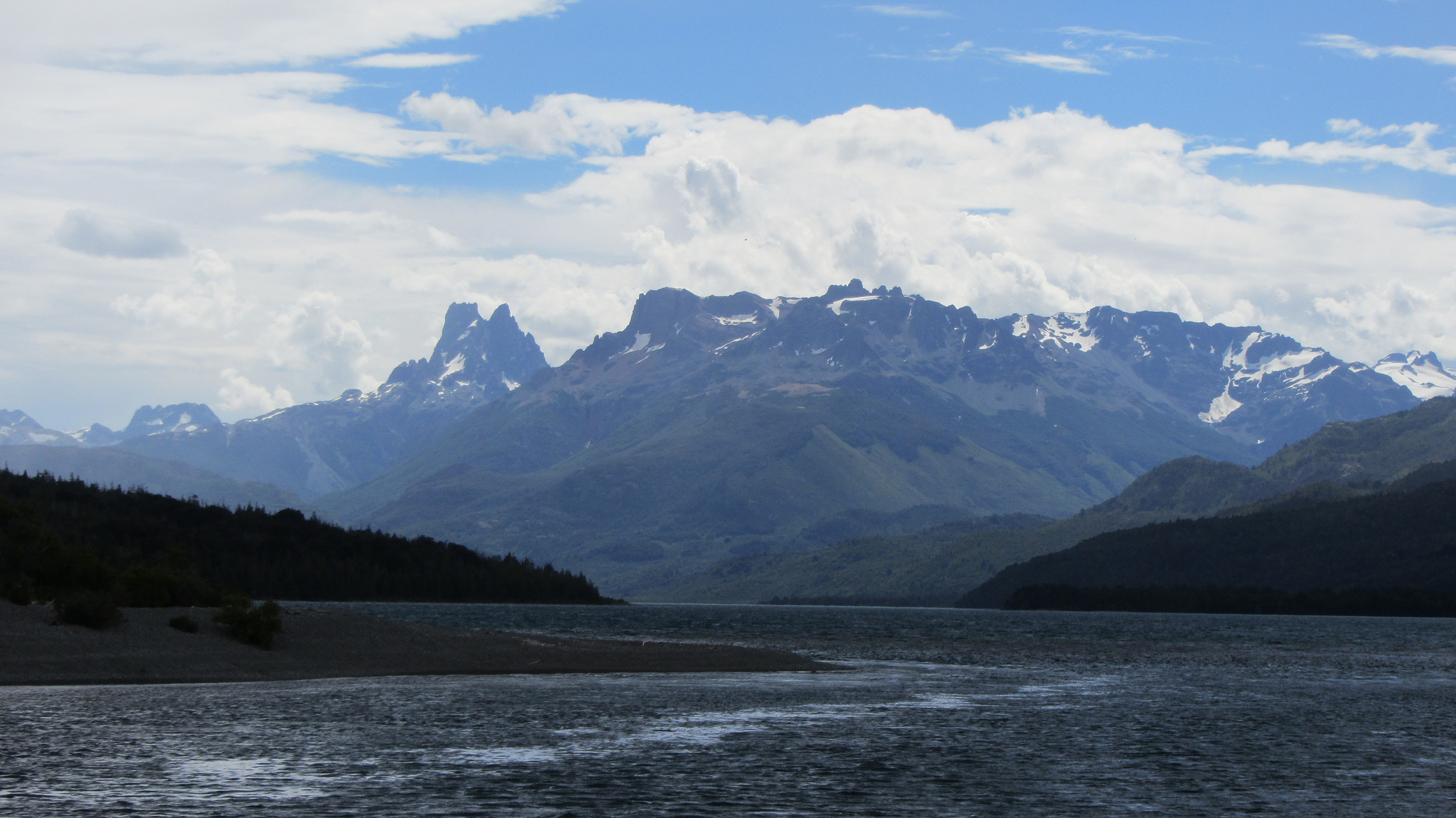
Lake Cholila

Chubut stretches from the Atlantic to the Andes with 3 distinct environmental regions: The Andes, the central plains and the coastal regions. The Andes in the westernmost parts of the province mostly extend along the Chilean border. The Andes are not that high in Chubut, with most peaks averaging around 1,500 and 2,000 metres (4,900 and 6,600 ft), which becomes smaller in altitude in the southern parts. The highest peak is Cerro Dos Picos, located east of Lake Cholila with a height of 2,515 metres (8,251 ft). The Andes in this province are of tertiary origin and are separated by wide, deep transverse valleys that are oriented in an east–west direction. These valleys are occupied by glacial lakes and rivers flowing east from the mountains. Most of these valleys existed before the Andes were formed. The lakes, which are mostly located in the western parts of the province are of glacial origin because during the last ice age, the movement of the glaciers lead to the formation of extensive areas of depressions that were filled up with water to form the lakes today.

=== Climate ===
Köppen climate map of Chubut, Argentina

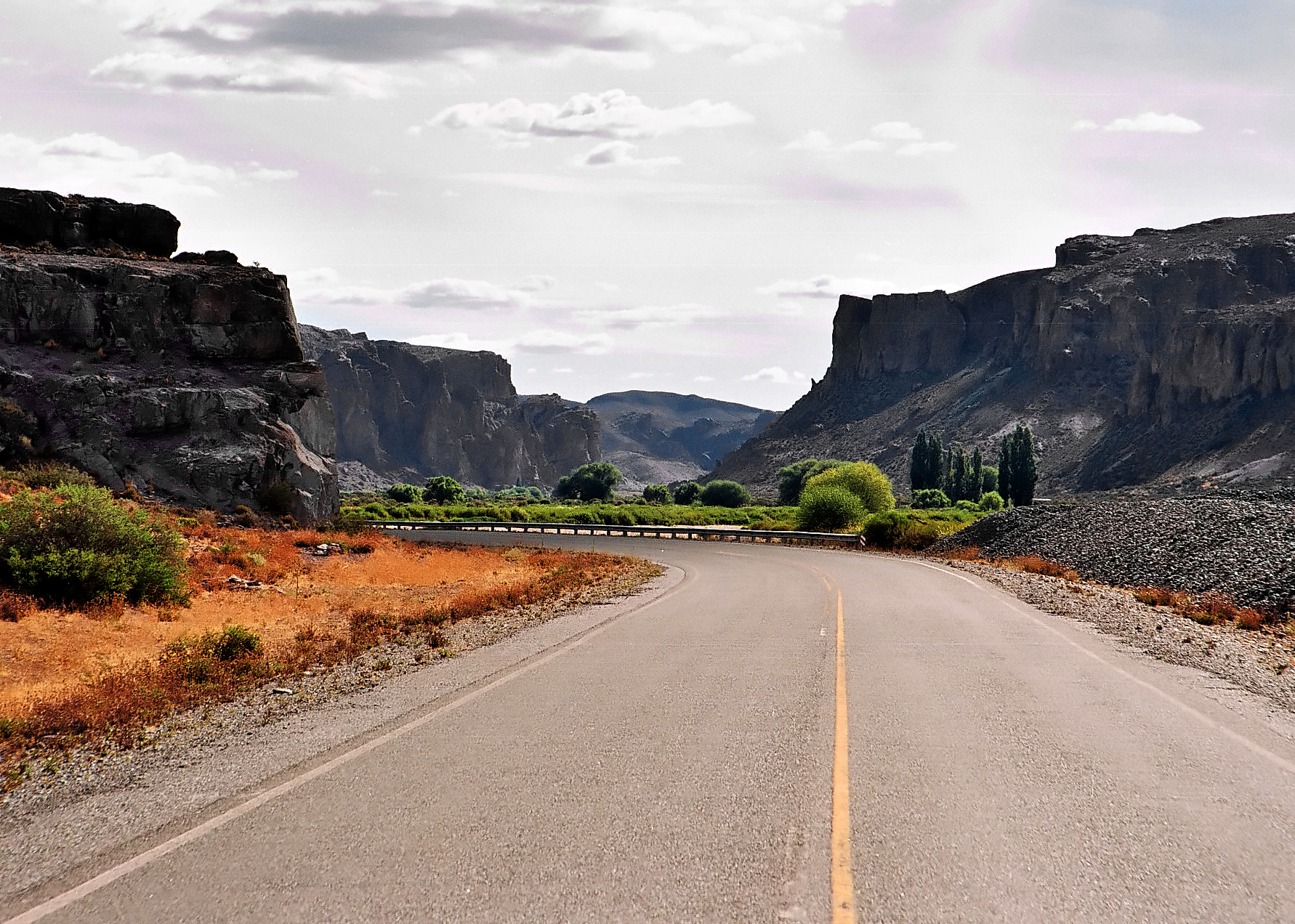
Los Altares

The Andes cause humid winds from the Pacific Ocean to rise so most of the moisture precipitates on the western side of the Andes, leaving all except the Andean portion of the province dry. In the Andean region, the climate is cold for its latitude owing to the higher elevations there and the influence of winds from the Pacific Ocean. The peaks are usually snow covered throughout the year. In this region, precipitation ranges from 700 mm (28 in) to over 2,500 mm (98 in) in some areas. The central parts of the province have an arid climate with hot, sunny summers but cold winters and only average 200 mm (7.9 in) of precipitation a year. The central parts of the province are very windy throughout the year. The coast has an arid or semi-arid climate, with hot but short summers and cold winters. It is the mildest region in the province with the warmest annual mean temperatures. The coast region's climate is a transition between the more temperate climates to the north and the colder climates in the south. Summers tend to be much warmer than Santa Cruz province to the south, particularly in the summer since subtropical air from the north and a branch of the warm Brazil Current can reach the province up until 46°. Because there are few land masses in the Southern Hemisphere, most of the cold fronts, which usually move in a west-to-east direction, are moderated as they pass over the Pacific Ocean. As such, cold temperatures are not as extreme as they are in the northern hemisphere. Similar to the rest of Patagonia the climate is characterized by strong winds throughout the year, which also leads to higher evapotranspiration, another factor in the province being mostly dry.

==== Temperature ====
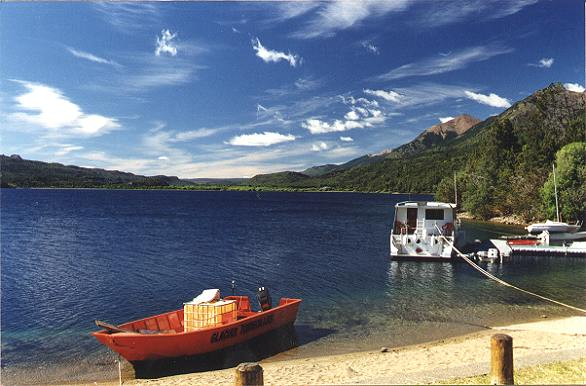
The town of Esquel

The western parts of the province are the coldest with an annual mean temperature of 8 °C (46.4 °F) owing to the higher elevations while the coastal areas are the warmest with an annual mean temperature of 12 to 14 °C (53.6 to 57.2 °F). The central parts of the province have an annual mean temperature of 10 to 12 °C (50.0 to 53.6 °F) since they have a higher elevation than the coastal areas. During winter, the mean temperature in the coldest months ranges from 6 to 7 °C (42.8 to 44.6 °F) in the northern parts of the province to 4 to 7 °C (39.2 to 44.6 °F) in the southern parts. In the Andes, the mean temperature can be close to 0 °C (32.0 °F). Unlike the northern hemisphere, most of the cold air masses originate from the Pacific Ocean, which moderates the cold air and as such, extreme cold temperatures are rare. Occasionally, cold air masses from Antarctica are not moderated by the ocean, resulting in very cold temperatures. During summer, the temperature gradient is greater than in the winter. The northern parts of the province, have a mean temperature greater than 20 °C (68.0 °F) in the warmest months while in the southern parts, the mean temperature in the warmest month ranges from 17 to 19 °C (62.6 to 66.2 °F) owing to the influence of subtropical air from the north. The westernmost parts of the province are the coolest during the summer, averaging only 14 °C (57.2 °F). The central parts of the province have the most extreme temperatures which can reach over 40 °C (104.0 °F) during the summer and below −20 °C (−4.0 °F) in the winter. The lowest temperature recorded in Chubut was −33 °C (−27.4 °F) in Sarmiento.

==== Humidity and precipitation ====
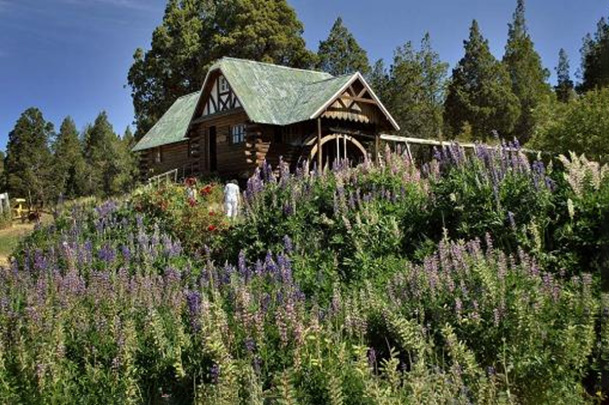
Trevelin

In general, relative humidity values do not vary a lot across the province and the contrast is not that large. In the coastal areas, the mean relative humidity is about 70% while in the rest of the province, it is around 50%–60%. The exception is in the higher altitude areas in the Andes in the colder regions where humidity levels are considerably higher. During the summer months, humidity levels are relatively low.

Because the Andes block most of the moisture from the Pacific Ocean from coming in, causing it to release most of the precipitation on its western slopes, most of the province is dry, averaging less than 200 mm (7.9 in) a year. In the central parts of the province, some areas receive less than 100 mm (3.9 in) of precipitation a year. In the Andean part, precipitation increases towards the Chilean border and precipitation ranges from 700 mm (28 in) to over 3,000 mm (120 in). A Mediterranean like precipitation pattern, similar to central Chile with dry summers and wet winters is found in the area between the Andean region to the west and the dry steppes to the east. Although precipitation can widely vary among the province, in all locations, precipitation is higher during the winter months. Thunderstorms are rare and occur exclusively during the summer.

==== Wind and sunshine ====
One defining characteristic of the climate in Chubut province is the strong wind that is observed throughout the province. The wind is an additional factor that makes most of the province dry since it favors evaporation of moisture. Most of the wind comes from either the west, southwest or northwest but in coastal areas during the summer months, a sea breeze can form when westerly winds are weak, forming easterly winds that can penetrate up to 10 kilometres (6.2 mi) from the coast. The mean wind speed is 6 metres per second (20 ft/s) with higher wind speeds being recorded in the south where the average is more than 9 metres per second (30 ft/s). Higher altitude areas are more windy than lower altitude areas, resulting in the Andean region being windier than the coastal areas. As in much of Patagonia, summers tend to be windier than winters.

Sunshine in the province follows a north–south gradient (decreases from north to south), particularly during summer where northern parts of the province can receive 10 hours of sunshine/day while southern parts receive 8 hours of sunshine/day. During winter months, the province receives 4–5 hours of sunshine/day.

=== Localities ===
- Astra, Chubut
- Cerro Dragón oil field
- El Escorial, Chubut
- Quinta El Mirador

== Demographics ==
Historical population
Year	Pop.	±%
1895	3,748	—
1914	23,065	+515.4%
1947	92,456	+300.8%
1960	142,412	+54.0%
1970	189,920	+33.4%
1980	263,116	+38.5%
1991	357,189	+35.8%
2001	413,237	+15.7%
2010	509,108	+23.2%
2022	592,621	+16.4%
Source: INDEC

As of the 2022 census, the population is 592,621, of whom 49.2% are male and 50.8% are female. People under 15 years old make up 22.4% of the population, and people over 65 years old make up 10.1%.

== Government ==
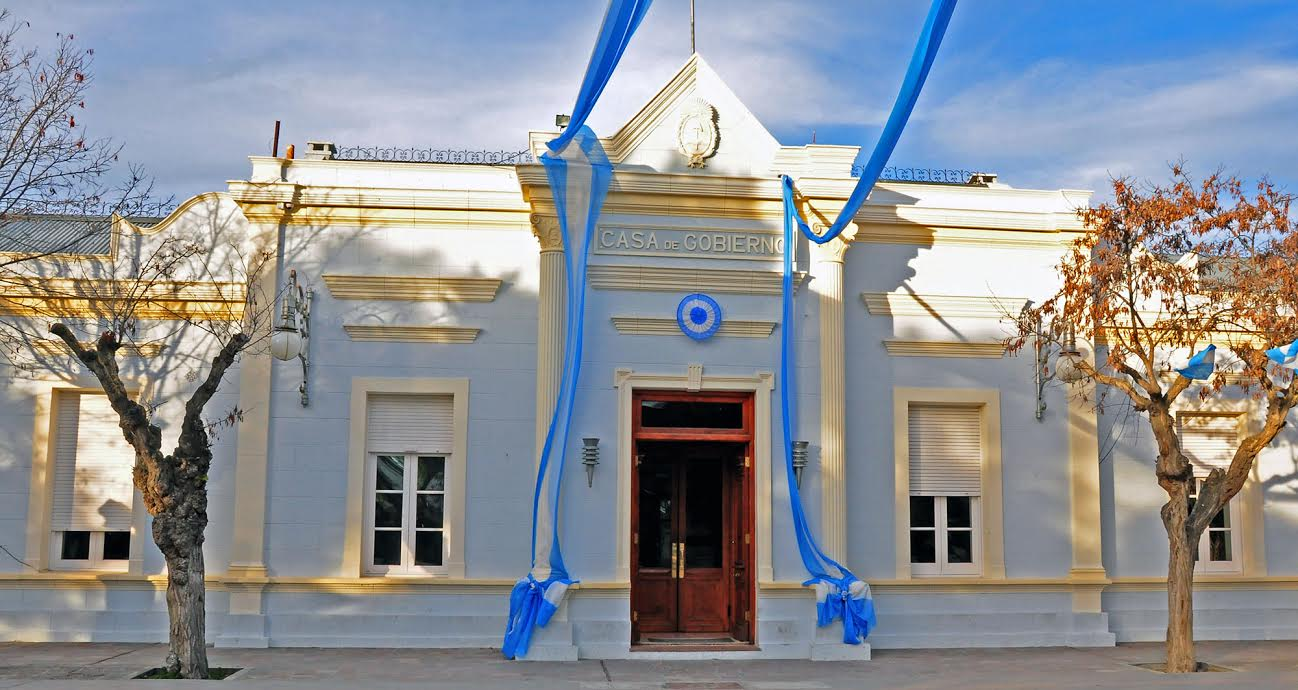
Government House at Rawson

The provincial government is divided into the usual three branches: the executive, headed by a popularly elected governor, who appoint the cabinet; the legislative; and the judiciary, headed by the Supreme Court and completed by several inferior tribunals.

The Constitution of Chubut Province forms the formal law of the province.

In Argentina, the most important law enforcement organization is the Argentine Federal Police but the additional work is carried out by the Chubut Provincial Police.

=== Administrative divisions ===
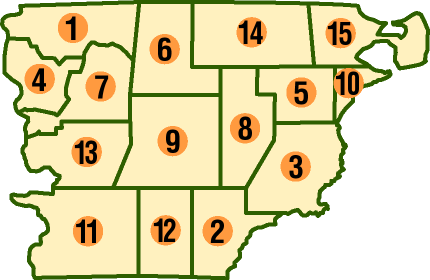
Departments of the Province of Chubut

The province is divided into 15 departments (Spanish: departamentos), listed below with their Number (on map), area and populations at the Censuses of 15 May 1991, 17 November 2000, 27 October 2010 and 16 May 2022:

Name	No. on Map	Capital	Area (km^{2})	Census 1991	Census 2001	Census 2010	Census 2022
Biedma	15	Puerto Madryn	12,940	45,494	58,677	82,883	103,173
Cushamen	1	Cushamen	16,250	13,885	17,134	20,919	28,209
Escalante	2	Comodoro Rivadavia	14,015	129,229	143,689	186,583	215,453
Florentino Ameghino	3	Camarones	16,088	1,166	1,484	1,627	1,786
Futaleufú	4	Esquel	9,435	30,782	37,540	43,076	50,316
Gaiman	5	Gaiman	11,076	8,209	9,612	11,141	12,639
Gastre	6	Gastre	16,335	1,900	1,508	1,427	1,195
Languiñeo	7	Tecka	15,339	3,321	3,017	3,085	2,884
Mártires	8	Las Plumas	15,445	805	977	778	754
Paso de Indios	9	Paso de Indios	22,300	1,883	1,905	1,867	1,886
Rawson	10	Rawson	3,922	100,243	115,829	131,313	145,763
Río Senguer	11	Alto Río Senguer	22,335	6,172	6,194	5,979	6,366
Sarmiento	12	Sarmiento	14,563	7,663	8,724	11,396	14,596
Tehuelches	13	José de San Martín	14,750	4,801	5,159	5,390	5,978
Telsen	14	Telsen	19,893	1,636	1,788	1,644	1,623
Total	-	Rawson	224,686	357,189	413,237	509,108	592,621

== Economy ==
Chubut's economy, for a long time one of the most prosperous in Argentina, is one of the country's least diversified. Nearly one-quarter of its 2006 output, estimated at US$4.652 billion (or a per capita income of US$11,256), is generated by mining and petroleum. This sector's contribution (mostly centered around Comodoro Rivadavia) helped give Chubut the nation's fourth-highest per capita output in 2011, US$25,250. Petroleum refining is the main economic activity of the province; it generates 13% of Argentine oil production (mostly off-shore). On May 21, 2014, Miguel Galuccio of YPF and Chubut Governor Martin Buzzi announced the first unconventional oil and gas discovery in Chubut from a fracked well in the Early Cretaceous D-129 formation of the Golfo San Jorge basin. Chubut produces 21% of the nation's fish catch.

Sheep ranching, though less than half as productive in the 21st century compared to as recently as 1990, remains important at the local level. The advent of synthetic replacements for wool after World War II battered the sector. It declined further because of Argentina's political instability and damage from natural disasters. Wool production has risen since 2002, however, and totaled 71,000 tons in 2006.

=== Tourism ===
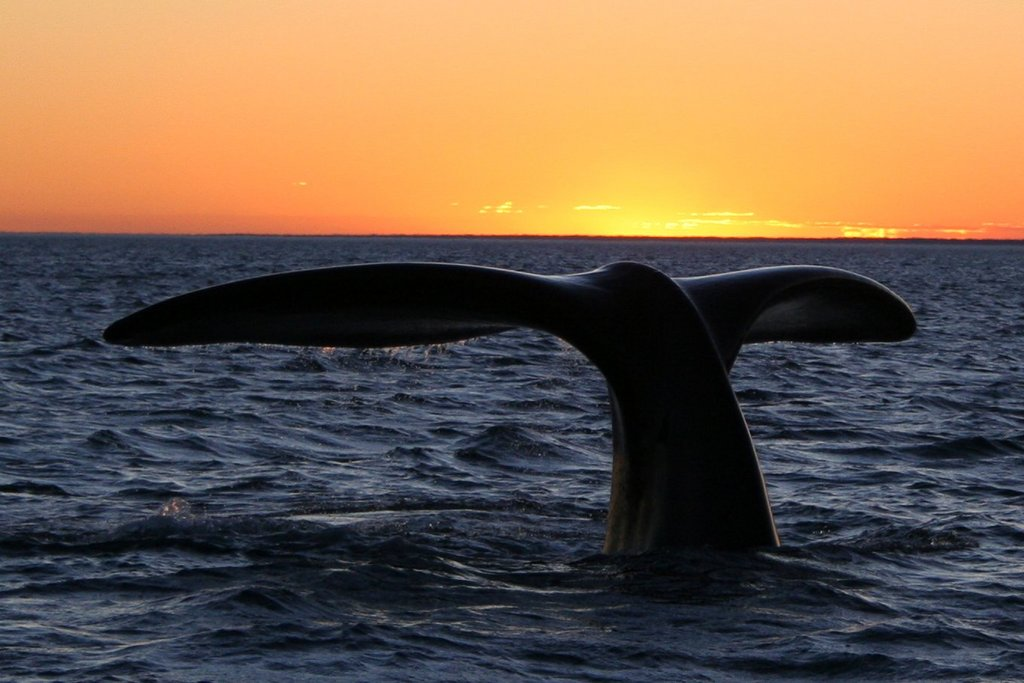
Southern right whale in Península Valdés, its preferred sanctuary

Tourism is also a growing industry. The main attractions are Peninsula Valdés and other marine wildlife reservoirs such as Punta Tombo and Punta Ninfas, with right whales, eared seals, elephant seals, penguins, orcas and many other animals. At the Punta Tombo site there is one of the largest breeding areas for the Magellanic penguin.

Further south, on the sparsely populated beaches of the Golfo San Jorge, is the only place in the world where the peculiar, flightless Chubut steamer duck can be observed. In the Andean region, the Los Alerces National Park, impressive lakes and hikes near Esquel are also visited every year by many tourists. The 'Old Patagonian Express' (also known as La Trochita), the old steam train made famous by Paul Theroux, attracts many to Esquel, as does the La Hoya ski center. The petrified forest near Sarmiento is a 150 km^{2} park with some of the largest fossilised trees in the world.

== Media ==
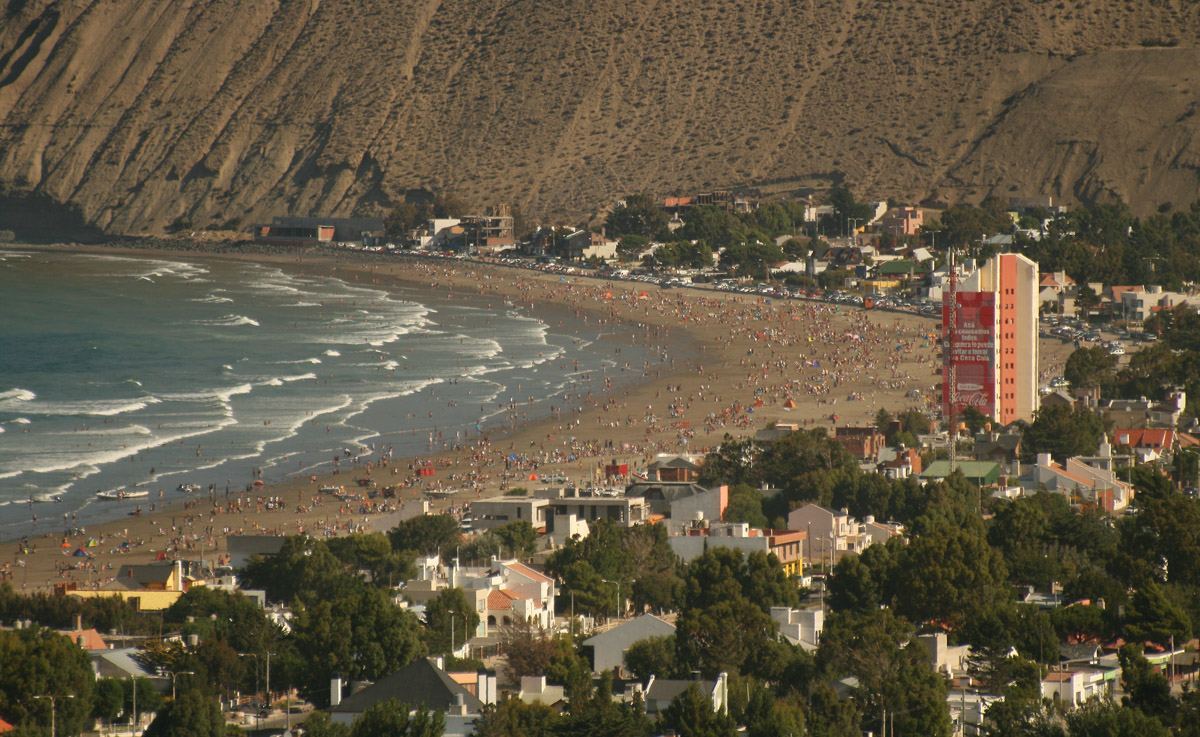
Rada Tilly, on the Atlantic Ocean

=== Newspapers ===
Print newspapers include:

- Crónica and El Patagónico in Comodoro Rivadavia
- El Oeste in Esquel
- El Diario de Madryn in Puerto Madryn
- El Chubut and Jornada in Trelew
- Y Drafod, Welsh language newspaper since 1891

=== Online journalism ===
Online journalism has a small, growing presence in Chubut. The six print newspapers have online editions; these are updated every 24 hours. Some new digital proposals make a better use of web's potential. One case is Infochubut.com, a recent publication that works with audio, video, text and photographs for its news and offers forums for public participation. Some radio stations in northwest Chubut began to publish online some of the interviews made in their radio studies.

=== Radio ===
The most populous cities are served by AM radio stations, such as Chubut Radio and Three Radio in Trelew, Golfo Nuevo's Radio in Puerto Madryn, National Radio in Comodoro, Rivadavia and Esquel. There are also several FM radio stations which broadcast programs from a national central office.

=== Television ===
The provincial government runs a TV network that covers the province. In Trelew, Comodoro Rivadavia, Esquel, Puerto Madryn and in some small towns there are other local TV stations producing local programming to supplement the programming received from the Buenos Aires networks.

== Transport ==
The Ruta Nacional 3 runs along the coast line up to Buenos Aires, and down to Tierra del Fuego. The Ruta Nacional 25 crosses Chubut from East to West, connecting Trelew and Esquel, but half of it has not yet been paved. Regular long-distance buses run several times a day to Buenos Aires, and to many locations in the Santa Cruz Province. Short range buses to towns in Chubut run at least once a day. There are also daily summer buses on the route #25. The Trelew airport (IATA REL) serves regular flights to/from Buenos Aires and El Calafate. Airports are also maintained at Comodoro Rivadavia (General Enrique Mosconi International Airport), Rawson and Esquel.

Major highways include:

- Route 2, from Puerto Pirámides and Península Valdés
- Route 3, north–south via Trelew and Comodoro Rivadavia
- Route 26, west from Comodoro Rivadavia (223 km)
- Route 20, which continues north 178 km to Jose de San Martín
- Route 22, north from Perito Moreno (Santa Cruz province) 125 km
- Route 25, west from Trelew (341 km)
- Route 62, which continues west 166 km to join Route 40 at Tecka
- Route 40, traveling north 266 km via Esquel to Cabeza del Indio
- Route 30, east 73 km from Route 3 to the coast at Camarones
- Route 259, west from Esquel to Chile.

Four other roads travel west to Chile's Aysén region, including Balmaceda and Coihaique Alto, and two to Chile's Los Lagos region from Corcovado to Palena and from Esquel via Trevelin to Futaleufu.

== Institutions ==
Chubut is covered by the Roman Catholic Diocese of Comodoro Rivadavia. The cathedral, dedicated to San Juan Bosco is in Comodoro Rivadavia.

The university, Universidad Nacional de la Patagonia San Juan Bosco, is based in Comodoro Rivadavia with campuses at Esquel, Trelew and Puerto Madryn, as well as in Ushuaia, Tierra del Fuego.

The Estación de Fotobiología Playa Unión is based in the town of Playa Unión.
