= 2021 Argentine Patagonia wildfires =

Wildfires in Argentina

The Argentine Patagonia wildfires begun on Sunday March 7, 2021 when a focus of fire appeared at kilometer 21 of Provincial Route 6 of Río Negro Province, Argentina. Subsequently, the fire spread to Las Golondrinas, Lago Puelo, El Hoyo, El Maitén and Cholila in Chubut Province, following the 42nd parallel south. The fire would spread aided by the wind reaching populated areas where there have been reports of burned vehicles and the destruction of hundreds of houses. Servicio Nacional del Manejo del Fuego helped people evacuate the area. Various causes have been proposed for the fire, including the fall of a trees on electrical transmission cables, given that the fires follow the electrical wiring. Intentional fires have also been proposed as a cause. National minister of Ambiente y Desarrollo Sostenible, Juan Cabandié, called for an investigation through a criminal complaint about the causes of the fire. As of March 12, 2021, 11 people were missing.

== Chronology ==
- March 7 a fire appears at the kilometer 21 of Provincial Route 6 of Río Negro Province.
- March 9 a new fire appears in Las Golondrinas y en Cerro Radal (northwestern Chubut Province). The fire spreads greatly due to high wind speeds and elevated temperatures.
- March 10 there where actives fires at El Boquete (Bariloche, Río Negro), Tehuelches, Solís and in Población Carril (Chubut). The fires in Futaleufú and Cushamen where by then under control.

== See also ==
- Drought in Chile
