= 2023 Chile wildfires =

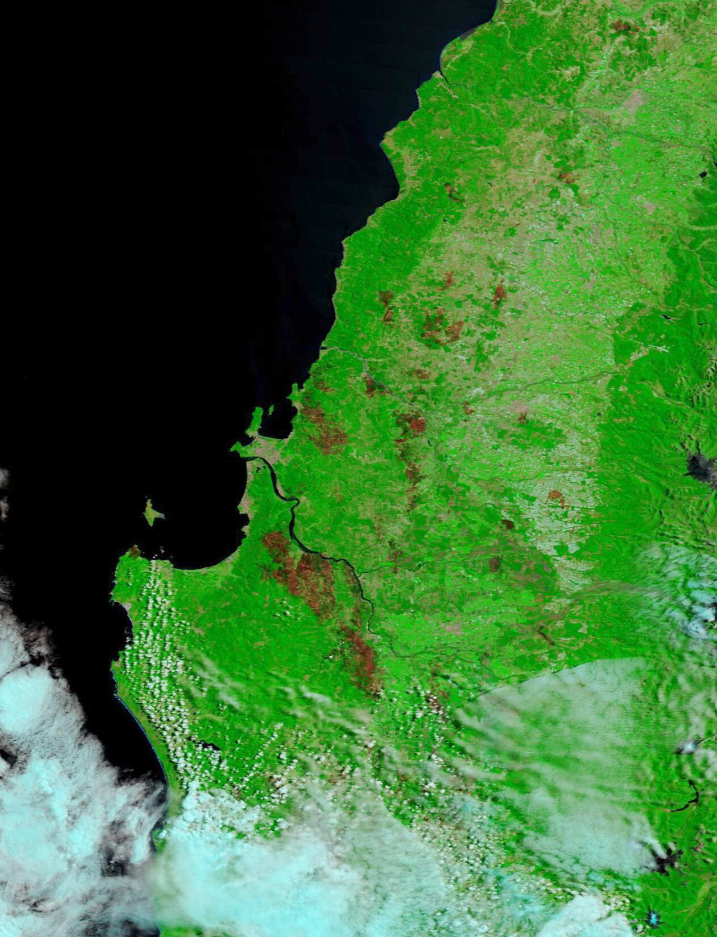
- Burn scars left from the outbreak of wildfires in Chile from January to February 2023
- Date: 30 January 2023–20 February 2023
- Location: Chile; In the regions of: Maule, Ñuble, Biobío, and Araucanía

Statistics
- Total fires: 407 (256 active, 151 contained as of 18 February)
- Total area: 430,000 hectares (1,100,000 acres)

Impacts
- Deaths: 26
- Injuries: 2,180
- Structures destroyed: 1,180+ homes destroyed

Ignition
- Cause: Heatwaves, drought, suspected arson

Wildfire formation on 3 February 2023 captured by GOES-16

Color satellite image of the 2023 Chile wildfires between 1 and 5 Feb 2023

Starting on 30 January 2023, a series of wildfires began in the South American country of Chile. By early February, the fires had developed into a large outbreak of at least 406 individual fires, several dozen of which were classified as "red alert fires". The fires burned more than 430,000 hectares (1,100,000 acres) and resulted in the loss of 24 lives, prompting the government to declare a state of emergency in multiple regions of the country.

== Background and cause ==
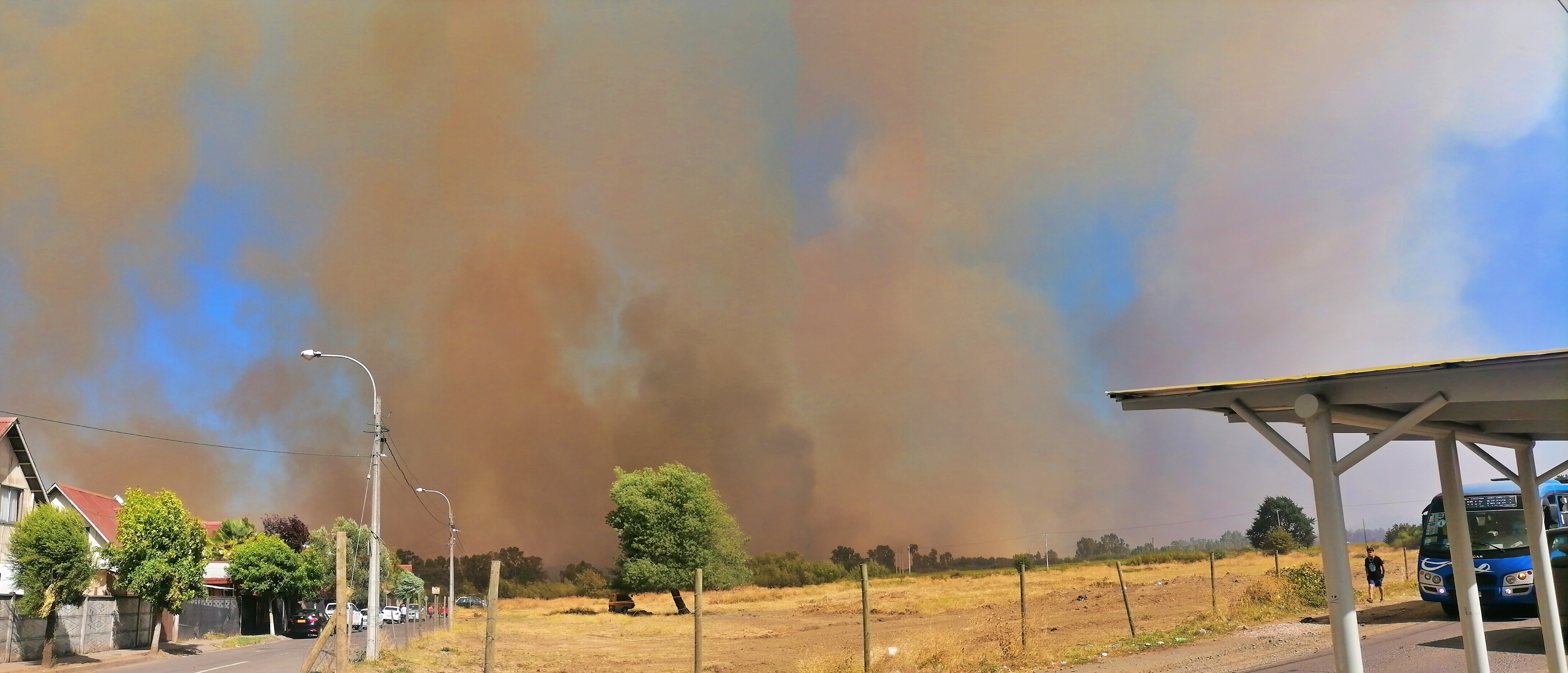
Wide view of forest fire in Boyén from the intersection of Zafiro street with Camino Nuevo, in Villa Quilmo and Villa Río Chillán, in the city of Chillán

Chile has been suffering from a megadrought since 2010 – the worst for a thousand years. These drought conditions exacerbate summer fires because the vegetation becomes more flammable.

Since 30 January 2023, the Ñuble region has maintained a preventive early warning due to the threat of forest fires as a result of high temperatures. The fires coincided with an unprecedented heat wave in the south of the country, with temperatures reaching 40 degrees Celsius in southern areas.

René Garreaud from the University of Chile said the extremely high temperatures are driven by warm, naturally-recurring Puelche winds blowing from the east, superimposed on a warmer climate. The interior minister, Manuel Monsalve, confirmed that 17 people had been arrested for possibly starting fires by such activities as welding or burning wool.

While the wildfires may have been directly caused by human elements, the underlying drought conditions which have contributed to the severity of the wildfires have been attributed to a mix of worsening climate change conditions and the Pacific weather pattern known as La Niña. Though South America has a long history of drought, Chile is among the most vulnerable to the impacts of extreme weather events, changes in seasonal temperatures and rainfall, wildfires, and sea-level rise (flooding). Poor territorial planning has been blamed for the ease of spread of the wildfires.

In late August 2022, Christián Little, director of National Forest Corporation (CONAF), explained in the Chilean Congress that there was a major risk of wildfires, large and simultaneous, from October 2022 to January 2023. It was argued that while 2022 had been a year with significant rains (Note: Despite being higher than the previous years the winter rainfall in 2022 was still below the historic means.) this had contributed to growth of grass that could produce fires in the dry season. The agriculture committee of the congress was updated by CONAF with a new harsher forecast in January 2023.

According to an estimate of CONAF about 41% of the wildfires in Ñuble, Biobío and Araucanía regions, from July 2022 to late February 2023, have been man-made and intentional. On a national level during the same period 25% of wildfires are thought by CONAF to be intentional.

The eventual spread of fires by wildlife such as rabbits-on-fire has been mentioned by officials but knowledge about this is mainly based on anecdotes and forest experts doubt the efficiency and relevance of this method of spread as rabbits-on-fire are likely move only a few meters before perishing or going out.

As of 18 February, 256 fires were burning across the country while a further 151 were under control. After a period of reprieve, fires began reigniting on 18 February in south-central Chile. By 20 February, the National Disaster Prevention and Response Service (Senapred) announced that 173 foci had been extinguished, but that 70 were still active.

Various specialists have pointed out the "human" and political causes of the fires that recurrently strike Chile. In 1974, the military dictatorship of Augusto Pinochet signed a decree designed to subsidise the intensive forestry industry and the monoculture of eucalyptus - a highly inflammable species - in the centre and south of the country.

The NGO Bosque Nativo deplores "the great deficiencies in the management of these monocultures. The majority of plantations are in the hands of two large industrial companies" and points to "a lack of control over these forestry companies. This would allow the state to guarantee sustainable management of these plantations, taking into account economic, social and environmental aspects. The regulation of the real estate sector, accused of taking advantage of the fires to develop, is also demanded by several NGOs. President Gabriel Boric has asked parliamentarians to urgently examine a draft law aimed at banning construction on burnt land for at least 30 years.

In 2017, central and southern Chile had already been hit by very large fires, with eleven deaths and 467,000 hectares burnt. Following these fires, the Centre for Climate and Resilience Sciences (CR2) published a report in 2020 recommending regulation of the forestry industry: "In a climate change scenario that favours an increase in the frequency, extent and intensity of fires, [...] it is very important to generate policies aimed at the control of invasive alien species [mainly pines and eucalyptus] and the restoration of native ecosystems to reduce the probability of catastrophic events."

== Impacts ==
=== Casualties ===
The Chilean government has reported at least 24 fatalities from the February wildfire outbreak, at least 11 of them in the town of Santa Juana in Biobío. Two of the other fatalities occurred when an emergency services helicopter crashed on 3 February, killing its pilot and a mechanic, and a third occurred when a firefighter was struck by a truck while working an incident. At least three people were severely injured by a fire on 18 February.

=== Political response ===
In February, Chile's interior ministry declared states of emergency in three regions: La Araucanía, Biobío, and Ñuble. Chilean President Gabriel Boric requested aid from neighboring countries Brazil, Argentina, and Uruguay.

President Gabriel Borić declared a national emergency, addressing the nation: "The protection of families is our priority. We are working in coordination with local and national authorities to fight the forest fires that affect the Maule, Ñuble, Biobío and La Araucanía regions."

Government spokesperson Camila Vallejo called on the private world to continue collaborating in dealing with the catastrophic situation resulting from the fires that are taking place in the Ñuble, Bío Bío, and La Araucanía regions.

== Damage ==
At least 800 homes have been destroyed by the fires, according to the Chilean government. Almost 300,000 hectares burned in the regions of Maule, Ñuble, Biobío and Araucanía. Per a report from Health Minister Ximena Aguilera, air quality in the affected areas has significantly deteriorated due to the smoke from the fires. On 7 February 2023, smoke from the fires drifted over the capital, Santiago. Chile's massive pulp and paper company CMPC confirmed that over 10,000 hectares of its plantations have been affected by the fires and some of its processing plants' operations had been halted. Chilean pulp and wood panel maker Arauco estimates a $50 million hit due to the fires.

== Firefighting ==
A total of around 5,600 firefighters and volunteers are fighting against fires across multiple regions, and a DC-10 air tanker from the United States arrived in the country to join the firefighters. The craft is capable of dropping 36,000 liters of water. In Chile, paid, professional firefighters called "brigadistas" concentrate on forest fires while the rest are all volunteers, including those who fight city blazes.

Several countries provided assistance to Chile to fight against the wildfires:

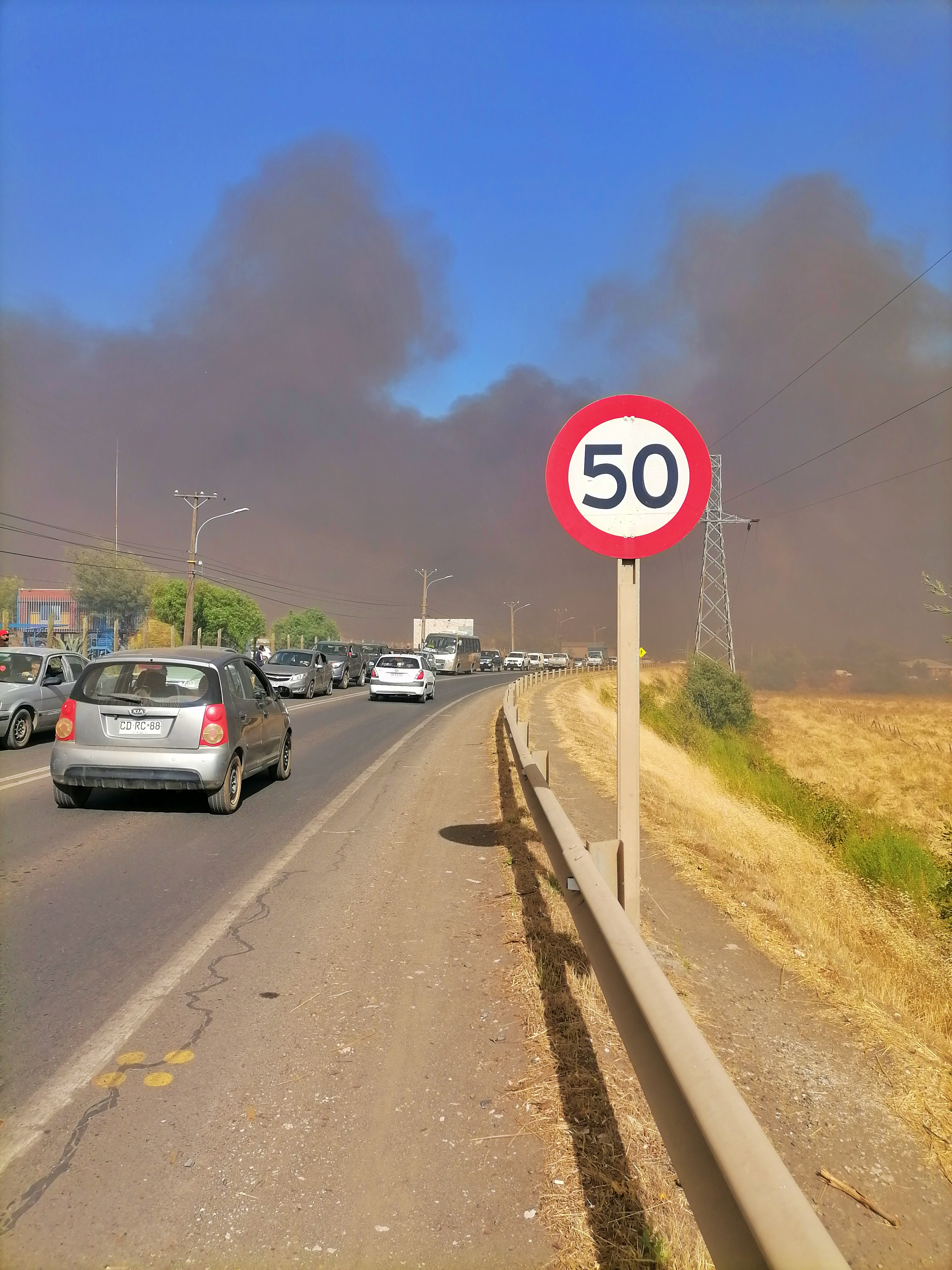
Vehicle congestion on Route N-55 (Road to Pinto) due to forest fire in the Boyén sector of the Chillán commune, Ñuble Region, Chile

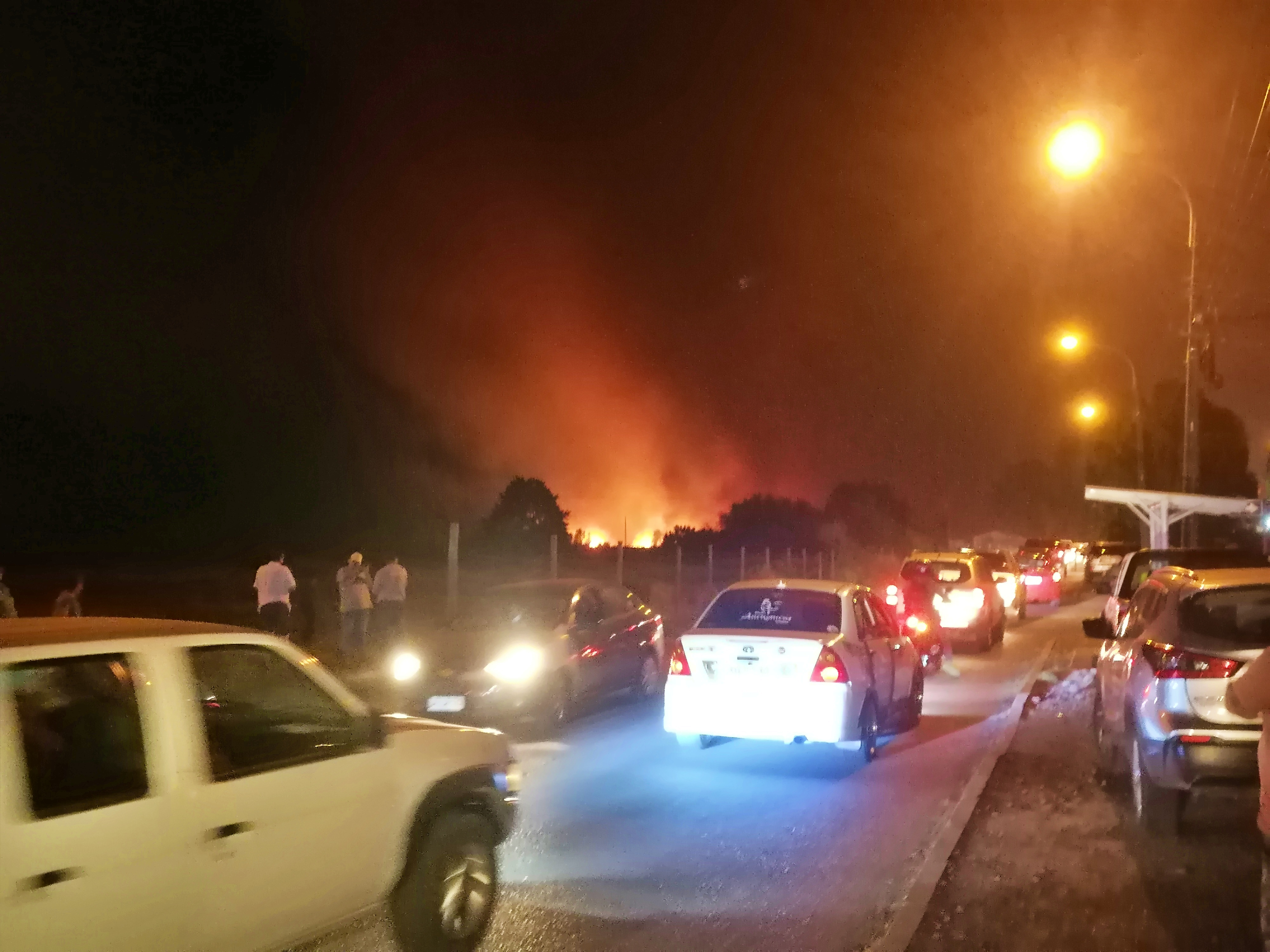
Traffic congestion due to the forest fire in Villa Jerusalem, in Camino Nuevo street

- Argentina: Sent 40 brigade members, 15 trucks and a helicopter.
- Brazil: Logistical support through brigade members.
- Colombia: sent a plane and a contingent to put out the forest fires.
- Ecuador: Logistical support through brigade members.
- Spain: The Government of Spain sent an A330 plane and 50 brigade members.
- United States: Financial support of 50 thousand dollars.
- Mexico: Two military planes with about 300 volunteers
- Peru: Several helicopters to fight fires.
- Venezuela: Sent 60 brigade members.
- European Union: Sent more than 250 firefighters, coordinators and medical staff.

== See also ==
- 2012 Araucanía wildfires
- 2017 Chile wildfires
- 2021 Argentine Patagonia wildfires
- Great Fire of Valparaíso
- June 2023 Chilean winter storm
- August 2023 Chilean winter storm
- 2023–2024 South American drought
- List of wildfires
