= 2017 Chile wildfires =

Series of wildfires in Chile during January 2017

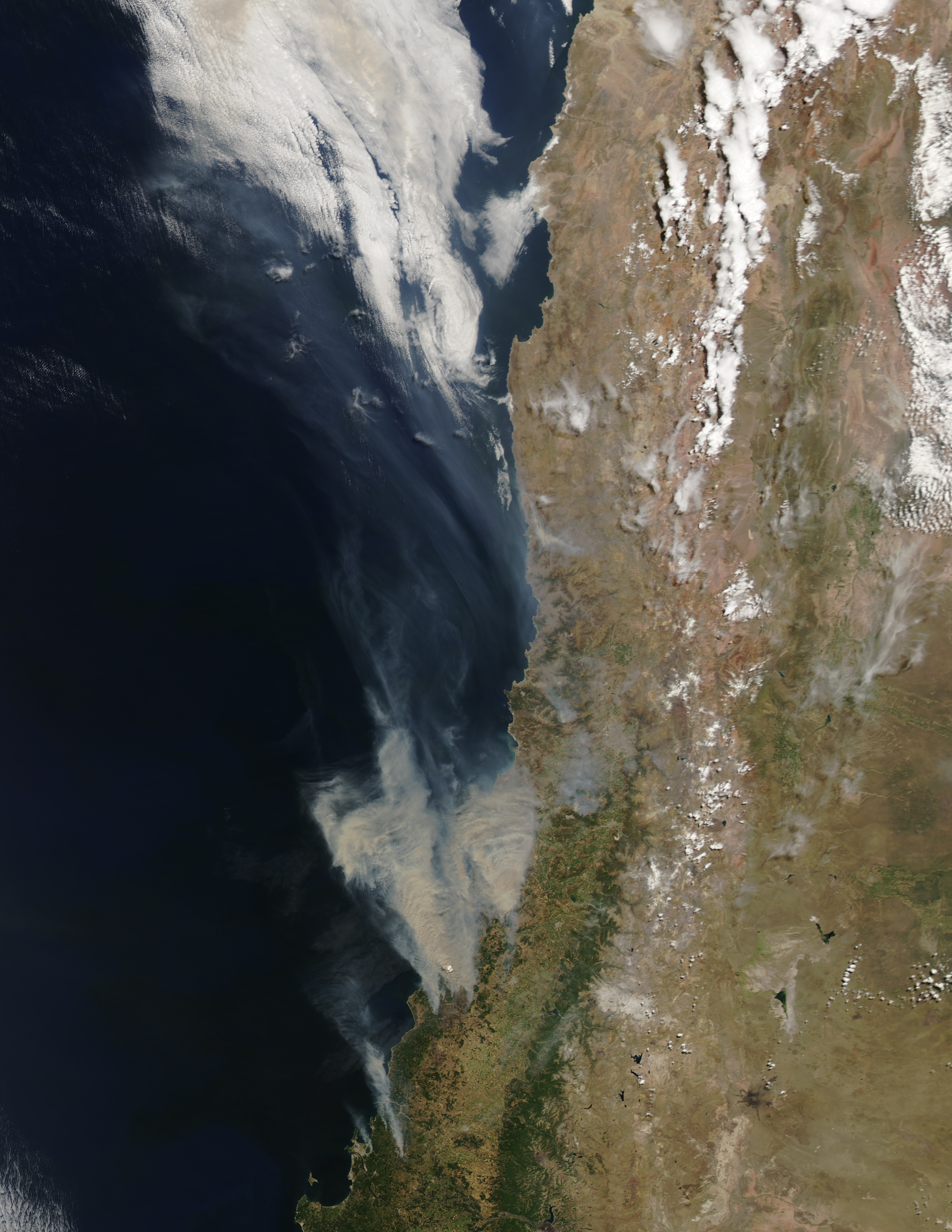
- Satellite image of the fires, captured by NASA on January 25, 2017.
- Location: Chile

Statistics
- Total fires: 5,274
- Total area: 1,408,988 acres (5,702 km^{2})

Impacts
- Deaths: 11
- Structures destroyed: 1000+

A series of wildfires burned across Chile during January 2017.

== Impact ==
On January 27–28, a wildfire described as the worst in Chile's modern history killed at least 11 people, including five firefighters and destroyed the town of Santa Olga in the central Maule Region, displacing thousands of people.

In the two decades from 2000 to 2020, the 2017 Chile wildfires were the ones that impacted the largest area of protected areas and the largest number of protected areas in Central Chile. In this regard only the wildfire seasons of 2009–2010 and 2019–2020 are comparable in the whole 2000–2020 period.

== Reactions ==
On January 20, the Chilean government declared a state of emergency in response to the wildfires.

Chilean President Michelle Bachelet cancelled her planned visit to Punta Cana, Dominican Republic, for the fifth CELAC Summit on January 24–25 due to the wildfires.

In late February 2022, five years after the fire Aída Baldini, manager of the wildfire division of the National Forest Corporation, declared that their budget to fight fires had increased five times.

== International support ==
- Argentina had more than 130 firefighters in Chile at one point.
- Austria sent firefighting equipment and tools.
- Brazil sent two MAFFS-equipped C-130 Hercules.
- Canada provided planes and helicopters.
- China provided economic support.
- Colombia sent more than 20 firefighters.
- The European Union sent a team of eight to Santiago.
- France sent 69 firefighters.
- Germany has donated US$215,000.
- Israel has pledged aid to Chile.
- Italy has pledged aid to Chile.
- Japan sent four people.
- Mexico sent more than 20 firefighters.
- Panama sent 21 firefighters.
- Peru sent more than 20 firefighters.
- Portugal sent 52 firefighters.
- Russia sent an Ilyushin Il-76 and more than 20 firefighters.
- South Korea provided economic aid.
- Spain sent 64 firefighters.
- Sweden sent firefighting equipment and tools.
- The United Arab Emirates has donated US$5 million.
- The United States sent four specialists from the U.S. Forest Service, and a private company sent an Evergreen 747 Supertanker with a crew of 12. The United States has also contributed US$1,580,000.
- Venezuela sent 80 firefighters.

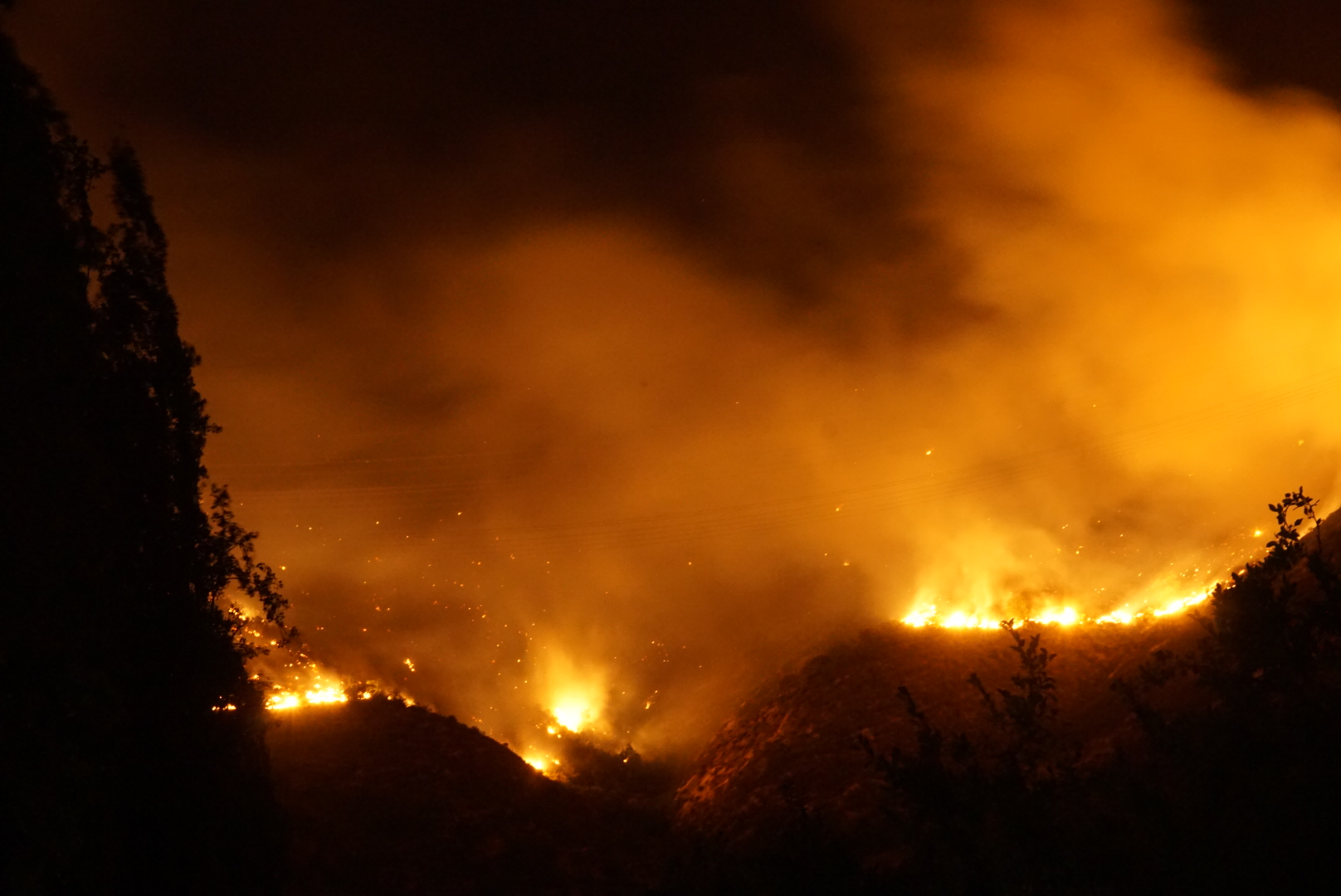
A wildfire burning in Pirque, Santiago Metropolitan Region, on January 21, 2017.

== See also ==
- 2012 Araucanía wildfires
- 2021 Argentine Patagonia wildfires
- Great Fire of Valparaíso
- List of wildfires
- 2023 Chile wildfires
