= Eulalio Muñoz =

Argentine long-distance runner

Personal information
- Born: 16 July 1995 (age 30) Gualjaina, Argentina

Sport
- Sport: Athletics
- Event: Long-distance running

Eulalio Muñoz (born 16 July 1995) is an Argentine long-distance runner. He qualified to represent Argentina at the 2020 Summer Olympics in Tokyo 2021, competing in men's marathon.

== Personal life ==
Muñoz was born in Gualjaina on 16 July 1995.
