= El Maitén =

- Town
- Location of El Maitén in Argentina
- Coordinates: 42°03′S 71°10′W
- Country: Argentina
- Province: Chubut
- Department: Cushamen
- Founded: 22 December 1942

Government
  - Intendant: Oscár Rubén Currilén (Justicialist Party)
- Elevation: 625 m (2,051 ft)

Population
  - Total: 3,782
- Demonym: Maitenense
- Time zone: UTC-3 (ART)
- CPA base: U9210
- Dialing code: +54 2945
- Climate: Csb

El Maitén is a town in Argentina in Cushamen Department on the margins of the Chubut River, on the northwest of Chubut Province, in Patagonia. In older times it was the intermediate point in the railroad tracks of the Old Patagonian Express between the towns of Ingeniero Jacobacci and Esquel.

== Location ==
The town is located 5 km (3 mi) south of the 42 parallel (inter-province border between the provinces of Río Negro and Chubut), at 720 m (2,362 ft) AMSL. Ex-Provincial route 40 runs through it on a north–south direction, which connects to the city of Esquel 135 km (84 mi) south.

Other connecting routes to El Maitén are National Route 243 towards El Bolsón and Bariloche in Río Negro Province, and Provincial routes RP 4 and RP 71, connecting to Cushamen and Epuyén respectively.

El Maitén lies 35 km (22 mi) south of Ñorquincó, 55 km (34 mi) east of El Bolsón, and 70 km (43 mi) northwest of Cushamen, and 30 km (19 mi) northeast of Epuyén.

== Geography and climate ==
The town of El Maitén lies on the right bank of the Chubut River. The river's valley is of glacial origin, and in this region it runs in a north–south direction on the first highlands of the Andes to the west, and the ancient formations of Patagonia to the east. The topography is mountainous, but of lower elevation, always under 2,000 m (6,562 ft).

This geographic region is a clear example of the transition between the humid wooded Andes areas to the West, and the classic more arid steppes of central Patagonia. Typical native trees of the area are the Austrocedrus chilensis, Coihue (Nothofagus dombeyi), Ñire (Nothofagus antarctica), and over 2,000 meters AMSL the Lenga (Nothofagus pumilio).

The climate is semi-steppe, with humid winters with occasional strong snows and an annual precipitation between, 300 and 500 mm (11.8 and 19.7 in).

Climate data for El Maitén
Month	Jan	Feb	Mar	Apr	May	Jun	Jul	Aug	Sep	Oct	Nov	Dec	Year
Record high °C (°F)	33.7 (92.7)	34.4 (93.9)	32.2 (90.0)	26.1 (79.0)	21.6 (70.9)	17.7 (63.9)	16.6 (61.9)	19.7 (67.5)	22.6 (72.7)	26.8 (80.2)	29.9 (85.8)	33.6 (92.5)	34.4 (93.9)
Mean daily maximum °C (°F)	23.5 (74.3)	22.9 (73.2)	20.6 (69.1)	15.9 (60.6)	11.4 (52.5)	8.6 (47.5)	7.6 (45.7)	9.0 (48.2)	12.5 (54.5)	15.2 (59.4)	17.6 (63.7)	20.5 (68.9)	15.1 (59.2)
Daily mean °C (°F)	16.2 (61.2)	15.1 (59.2)	12.8 (55.0)	8.8 (47.8)	5.7 (42.3)	4.0 (39.2)	3.0 (37.4)	3.9 (39.0)	6.2 (43.2)	8.7 (47.7)	11.2 (52.2)	13.8 (56.8)	8.9 (48.0)
Mean daily minimum °C (°F)	7.3 (45.1)	6.5 (43.7)	4.4 (39.9)	2.0 (35.6)	0.6 (33.1)	−0.4 (31.3)	−1.3 (29.7)	−0.7 (30.7)	0.2 (32.4)	1.6 (34.9)	3.9 (39.0)	5.9 (42.6)	2.3 (36.1)
Record low °C (°F)	−1.6 (29.1)	−1.8 (28.8)	−5.0 (23.0)	−8.1 (17.4)	−12.4 (9.7)	−12.7 (9.1)	−19.9 (−3.8)	−12.0 (10.4)	−8.6 (16.5)	−7.6 (18.3)	−5.2 (22.6)	−5.0 (23.0)	−19.9 (−3.8)
Average rainfall mm (inches)	17.9 (0.70)	18.1 (0.71)	20.5 (0.81)	47.7 (1.88)	86.6 (3.41)	99.4 (3.91)	109.6 (4.31)	106.2 (4.18)	38.8 (1.53)	29.4 (1.16)	28.7 (1.13)	40.9 (1.61)	606.0 (23.86)
Average relative humidity (%)	47.3	50.3	54.5	63.5	68.7	70.6	71.5	67.8	60.5	53.6	50.8	49.9	59.4
Source: Instituto Nacional de Tecnología Agropecuaria

== History and economy ==
What started as a rural community was influenced greatly by the arrival of the General Roca railroad to the area in 1939, on a branch that continued to Esquel. This branch was completed and opened in 1945, and El Maitén was selected as the site of its maintenance sheds and locomotive warehouse. This changed the town towards a railroad-based economy until the 1970s, when the Argentine railroad industry started a steady decline.

Even though most of the railroad system on which El Maitén was a waystop closed in 1993, a train still operates out of El Maitén, running a loop from El Maitén to the train station Bruno J. Thomae then back to El Maitén.

== See also ==
- Old Patagonian Express
