= Valentina Bassi =

Argentine actress

Valentina Bassi (born November 13, 1972) is an Argentine film and television actress.

Born in Trelew, Chubut Province, two of the recent films she starred in as the lead, Un Día de suerte (2002) and El Boquete (2006), have been well-received critically.

== Filmography ==
- 1993: El caso María Soledad
- 1994: Sin condena (TV Series 1994, 1 episode)
- 1994: La marca del deseo (TV Series, 13 episodes)
- 1994: Alta comedia (TV Series 1994, 1 episode)
- 1994-1995: To Learn to Fly (TV Series, 22 episodes)
- 1995: The Owner
- 1996: Wake Up Love
- 1996-1998: Verdad consecuencia (TV Series, 130 episodes)
- 1998: A Crysanthemum Bursts in Cincoesquinas
- 1998: Marriages
- 1998: 5 pal peso (Video)
- 1999: El hombre (TV Mini Series, 13 episodes)
- 2000: Primicias (TV Series, 37 episodes)
- 2000: El visitante
- 2000: Todo x 2 pesos (TV Series, 2 episodes)
- 2001: Culpables (TV Mini Series, 4 episodes)
- 2001: La caída del imperio (Short)
- 2002: Infieles (TV Mini Series, 1 episode)
- 2002: Every Stewardess Goes to Heaven
- 2002: Un día de suerte
- 2001-2002: Final Minute (TV Series, 2 episodes)
- 2002: Common Ground
- 2003: Gipsy Love (TV Series 2003, 251 episodes)
- 2003: Puerto de Partida (Short)
- 2004: Próxima Salida
- 2005: Doble vida (TV Series, 98 episodes)
- 2005: Otra vuelta
- 2005: Criminal (TV Mini Series, 3 episodes)
- 2006: El tiempo no para (TV Series, 129 episodes)
- 2006: El boquete
- 2007: Televisión por la identidad (TV Mini Series, 1 episode)
- 2007: 9 mm, crímenes a la medida de la historia (TV Mini Series, 1 episode)
- 2008: Killer Women (TV Series, 1 episode)
- 2009: Rodney
- 2009: Dromo (TV Mini Series, 1 episode)
- 2010-2011: Un año para recordar (TV Series, 92 episodes)
- 2011: Historias de la primera vez (TV Mini Series, 1 episode)
- 2011: Televisión por la inclusión (TV Mini Series, 3 episodes)
- 2011: Mistreated (TV Mini Series, 2 episodes)
- 2012: Historia Clinica (TV Mini Series, 1 episode)
- 2012: Amores de historia (TV Mini Series, 1 episode)
- 2012: The Clairvoyant's Prayer
- 2012-2013: Mi amor, mi amor (TV Series, 87 episodes)
- 2013: Historias de corazón (TV Mini Series, 1 episode)
- 2013: Historias de diván (TV Mini Series, 1 episode)
- 2013: Santos y pecadores (TV Mini Series 2013, 1 episode)
- 2015: El Asesor (TV Mini Series, 2 episodes)
- 2015: Cromo (TV Series, 4 episodes)
- 2015: Conflictos modernos (TV Mini Series, 1 episode)
- 2016: Las Ineses
- 2017: Libro de la Memoria: Homenaje a las víctimas del atentado (Short)
- 2017: Al Desierto
- 2021: I'm a Girl, I'm a Princess

== Awards nomination ==
- Argentine Film Critics Association Awards: Silver Condor; Best Actress, for Un Día de suerte; 2002.
