= Remake (2006 film) =

- Spanish theatrical release poster
- Directed by: Roger Gual
- Screenplay by: Roger Gual; Javier Calvo
- Produced by: Antonio Camín; Pablo Bossi
- Starring: Juan Diego; Sílvia Munt; Eusebio Poncela; Mercedes Morán; Mario Paolucci; Gustavo Salmerón; Marta Etura; Alex Brendemühl; Juan Navarro
- Cinematography: Cobi Migliora
- Edited by: Alberto de Toro
- Music by: Scott Herren
- Production companies: Ovideo; Patagonik Film Group
- Distributed by: Warner Bros. Pictures (ES); Buena Vista International (AR)
- Release dates: 17 March 2006 (Mar del Plata); 21 April 2006 (Spain); 28 September 2006 (Argentina)
- Running time: 95 minutes
- Countries: Spain; Argentina
- Language: Spanish

Remake is a 2006 drama film directed by Roger Gual. It is a Spanish-Argentine co-production. The cast includes Juan Diego, Sílvia Munt, Eusebio Poncela, and Mercedes Morán.

== Plot ==
Max, the only remaining member of a hippy commune in the mountains of Catalonia summons his now largely gentrified former friends to a meeting thirty years later along with his children, confronting life experiences.

== Cast ==
- Juan Diego as Damián
- Eusebio Poncela as Álex
- Alex Brendemühl as Fidel
- Gustavo Salmerón as Ernesto
- Sílvia Munt as Patricia
- Marta Etura as Laura
- Mercedes Morán as Carol
- Juan Navarro as Víctor
- Mario Paolucci as Max
- Chete Lera
- Antonio Dechent

== Production ==
The film is a Spanish-Argentine co-production by Ovideo alongside Patagonik Film Group. It was primarily shot in a masia in the Montseny mountains.

== Release ==
Remake was programmed in the competitive slate of the 21st Mar del Plata International Film Festival. The film was also presented at the 9th Málaga Film Festival in March 2006. Distributed by Warner Bros. Pictures, it was released theatrically in Spain on 21 April 2006.

== Reception ==
Jay Weissberg of Variety assessed that the film takes an "almost surgical pleasure in forcing hypocrisies into the light of day, though a tendency toward stagey soul-searching clouds cinematic judgment".

Sergi Sánchez of Fotogramas rated the film 4 out of 5 stars, considering that "the result is an ensemble drama that, like Todd Solondz's films, elicits embarrassed laughter from its audience".

Casimiro Torreiro of El País deemed Remake to be a "bold film that holds nothing back and takes aim at everything and everyone".

== See also ==
- List of Spanish films of 2006
