= June 2023 Chilean winter storm =

Weather event in Chile

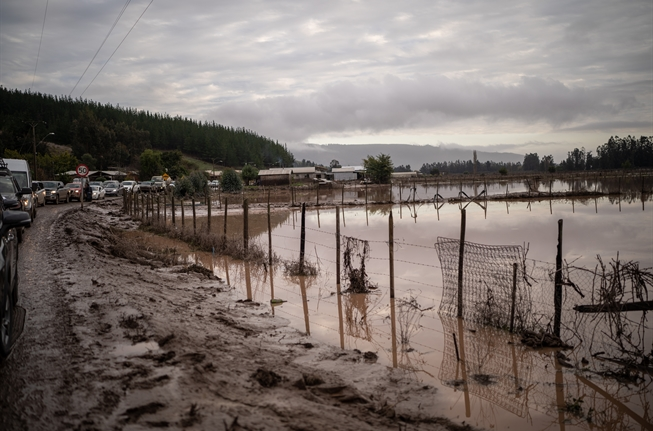
Flooded field next to Mataquito River. Commune of Curepto.

The June 2023 Chilean winter storm was a winter storm affecting Central Chile and much of Southern-central Chile. The regions spanning from Valparaíso in the north to Los Ríos in the south were impacted. Two people died as a consequence of the events and two others were reported missing several days after. The total number of affected people was counted as 19,469 including 12,074 people that were left temporarily isolated due to the shutdown of transport. About 1,800 houses were destroyed and 8,000 were partly damaged.

== See also ==
- August 2023 Chilean winter storm
- 2023 Chile wildfires
- White Earthquake
