= A Lucky Day =

A Lucky Day (Un día de suerte)
- Theatrical release poster
- Directed by: Sandra Gugliotta
- Written by: Sandra Gugliotta; Marcelo Schapces
- Produced by: Marcelo Schapces (executive producer); Sandra Gugliotta; Fernando Merinero
- Starring: Valentina Bassi
- Cinematography: José Guerra; Alberto Ianuzzi; Cobi Migliora
- Edited by: Alejo Flah
- Music by: Diego Frenkel; Sebastián Schachtel
- Distributed by: Cinema Tropical
- Release dates: February 22, 2002 (Germany); April 25, 2002 (Argentina)
- Running time: 95 minutes
- Countries: Argentina; Italy
- Languages: Spanish; Italian

A Lucky Day (Spanish: Un día de suerte) is a 2002 Argentine-Italian drama film directed by Sandra Gugliotta, in her feature film debut, and written by Gugliotta and Marcelo Schapces. In Argentina it's also known as Lo que buscas es amor. The executive producer was Marcelo Schapces, and it was produced by Sandra Gugliotta and Fernando Merinero. It stars Valentina Bassi as Elsa.

The theme of this docudrama is the economic turmoil and unemployment among the young population during the Argentine economic crisis (1999-2002). The film won two awards at the Berlin International Film Festival, winning also the Caligari Film Award and the Don Quixote Award.

== Plot ==
In 2000, Elsa (Valentina Bassi), a 25-year-old woman who barely makes a living as a promotional girl on the streets in Buenos Aires, commits minor crimes, like stealing from her boss' wallet, in order to survive. As a promotional girl, she does what can be considered humiliating work: handing out flyers for "anti-stress" tablets for motorists and pedestrians, dressing up in odd outfits for fast-food restaurants, and the like.

During the film, protests take place in the streets of Buenos Aires but Elsa ignores them. Included are documentary-like scenes of the 2001 riots that seem shot by a hand-held camera. She dreams of fleeing her impoverished country and traveling to Italy where a former "boyfriend", whom she had a one-night stand with several months before, left for better opportunities. This is ironic because her anarchist grandfather (Darío Víttori) left Italy and came to Argentina to escape poverty (he still has anti-establishment views) years ago. Her boyfriend Walter (Fernán Mirás) protests the trip, yet, her grandfather urges her to follow her heart. Her dream is mostly a fantasy she has in order to ameliorate the stress of surviving during Argentina's economic troubles.

== Cast ==
- Valentina Bassi as Elsa
- Claudio Gallardou as Alejandro
- Fernán Mirás as Walter
- Lola Berthet as Laura
- Darío Víttori as Abuelo
- Jesús Berenguer as Franco
- Damián De Santo as Toni
- Nicolás Mateo as Erasmo
- Claudia Lapacó as Madre
- Luis Luque as Hernando
- María Laura Cali as Claudia
- Mario Paolucci as Arístides
- Maria Amato

== Background ==
=== Basis of film ===
The film's backdrop is the economic crisis Argentina faced from 1999-2002. The poverty rate of Argentina grew from an already high 35.9% in May 2001 to a peak of 57.5% in October 2002. In addition, the May 2000 unemployment rate was 15.4%; it climbed to 18.3% in December 2001.

Un día de suerte was shot in Buenos Aires during the riots of 2000 when political unrest was at its highest. Blackouts were also a common occurrence and street crimes occurred often.

== Distribution ==
The film was first featured at the Berlin International Film Festival on February 22, 2002. It opened in Argentina on April 25, 2002.

It was screened at various film festivals, including: the Buenos Aires International Festival of Independent Cinema; the Sydney Film Festival, Australia; the Karlovy Vary Film Festival, Czech Republic; the Toronto International Film Festival, Canada; the AFI Film Festival, United States; the Angers Film Festival, France; and others.

== Critical reception ==
Clare Norton-Smith, writing for the BBC, liked how the characters were developed by Sandra Gugliotta, and wrote, "Although Elsa endures grim circumstances and resorts to desperate measures, the spirit of conviction and a belief in oneself, make this ultimately a warm, life-affirming film. As Gugliotta says, her film 'speaks of dreams, of the possibility and the struggle to fulfill a dream. And it also speaks of good people, of social barriers, and of roots.'"

Some critics felt the film's theme, that is, economic deprivation, did not go far enough. David Walsh, writing for the World Socialist web site wrote, "Again, without being given some sense of the historical circumstances which account for the present state of mind, one cannot go very far. The film lacks the 'pathos of distance.' A Lucky Day raises interesting questions, but does not go terribly deeply into them. The scenes of the working class kids strike one as a bit false and stereotyped, a middle class notion of what such young people are like."

== Awards ==
Wins

- Berlin International Film Festival: Caligari Film Award; Don Quixote Award - Special Mention; both for Sandra Gugliotta; 2002.
- Ankara Flying Broom International Women's Film Festival: FIPRESCI Prize; Sandra Gugliotta; 2002.

Nominations

- Argentine Film Critics Association Awards: Silver Condor; Best Actress, Valentina Bassi; Best First Film, Sandra Gugliotta; Best Supporting Actress, Lola Berthet; 2003.
- Buenos Aires International Festival of Independent Cinema: Best Film, Sandra Gugliotta; 2002.
- Goya Awards: Goya; Best Spanish Language Foreign Film, Sandra Gugliotta; 2003.
- Miami Latin Film Festival: Golden Egret Best Film; Sandra Gugliotta; 2003.
