= El Hoyo =

Coordinates: 42°03′48″S 71°31′13″W

- Municipality and village
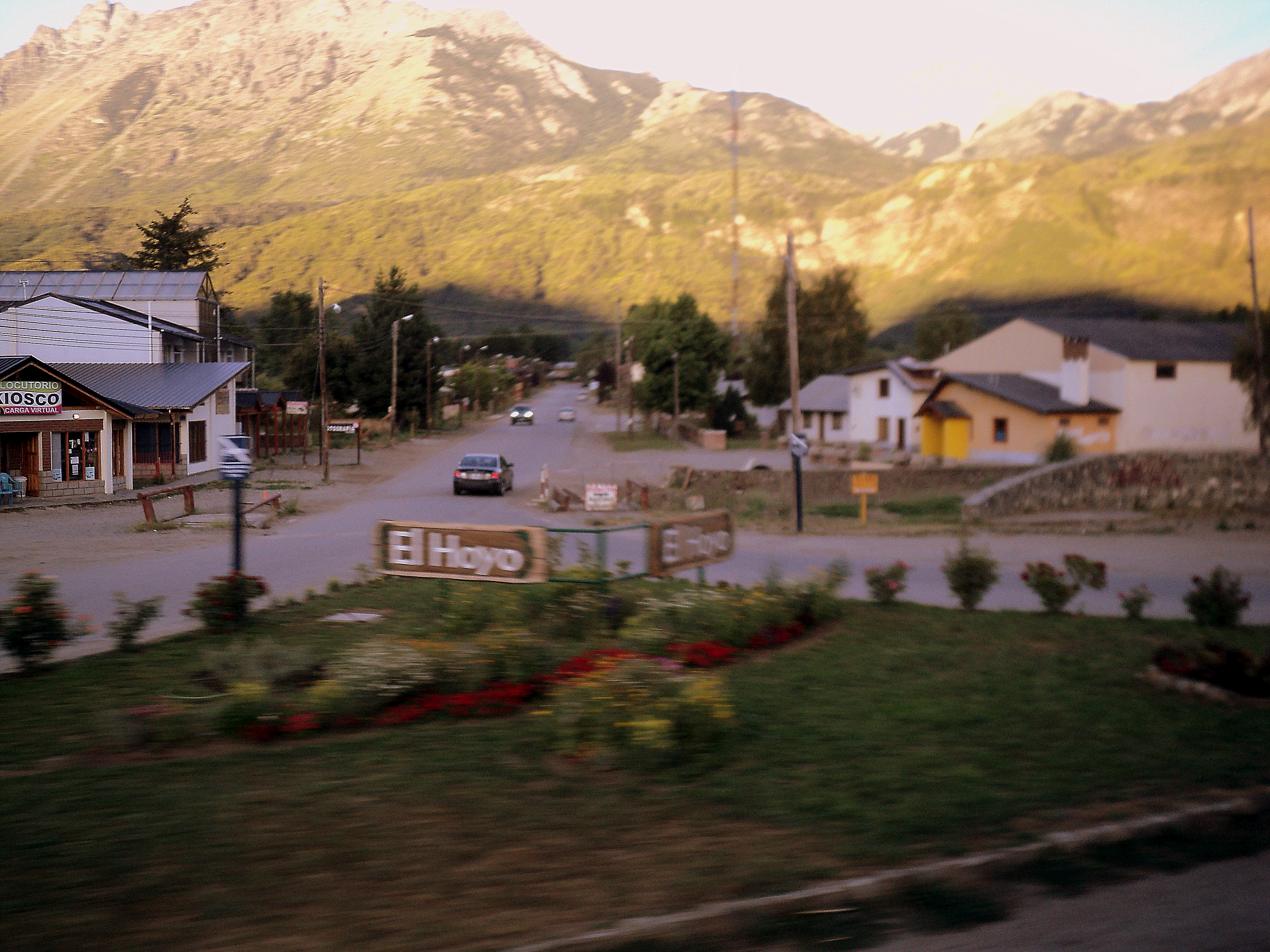
- Interactive map of El Hoyo
- Country: Argentina
- Province: Chubut Province
- Department: Cushamen Department
- Time zone: UTC−3 (ART)
- Climate: Csb

El Hoyo is a village and municipality in Chubut Province in southern Argentina.
