= Mario Paolucci =

Argentine film actor (1941–2008)

MarioPaolucci.

Mario Paolucci (September 15, 1941 - July 12, 2008) was an Argentine film actor.

Paolucci was born in Buenos Aires. Active since 1996, he appeared in over 20 films in the Cinema of Argentina, and has appeared in a number of acclaimed films by director Alejandro Agresti. Paolucci made his debut in Buenos Aires vice versa in 1996 and has also appeared in Una noche con Sabrina Love, (2000) with Cecilia Roth, the short film of Marcelo Schapces "Dónde estaba Dios cuando te fuiste" (1997) and La Fuga in 2001 with Gerardo Romano. In 2006 he appeared in the comedy El Boquete. He died, aged 66, in Lomas de Zamora, Gran Buenos Aires.

== Filmography ==
- Los cuentos de Fontanarrosa (2007) TV series.... as Bramuglia
- El infinito sin estrellas (2007).... as Cosme
- Remake (2006).... as Max
- El Boquete (2006)
- Un peso, un dolar (2006).... as Vicente
- Tatuado (2005).... as Viejo
- Padre Coraje (2 episodes, 2004)
- In Evil Hour (2004).... as Comandante
- Informe nocturno (2004)
- En la oscuridad (2004)
- Cleopatra (2003)
- La cruz del sur (2003).... as Rodolfo
- Chicas rollinga (2003)
- Los porfiados (2002).... as Dino Scarfo
- Un día de Suerte (2002).... as Arístides
- La fuga (2001).... as Carcelero
- La granja (2001)
- Western Coffee (2001)
- Una noche con Sabrina Love (2000).... as Carmelo
- Caminata espacial (2000)
- El planeta de los hippies (1999)
- El viento se llevó lo qué (1998)
- El milagro secreto (1998)
- Un día para siempre (1997)
- Buenos Aires Vice Versa (1996)
