= La Trochita =

750mm gauge line in Patagonia, Argentina

Coordinates: 42.950°S 71.183°W

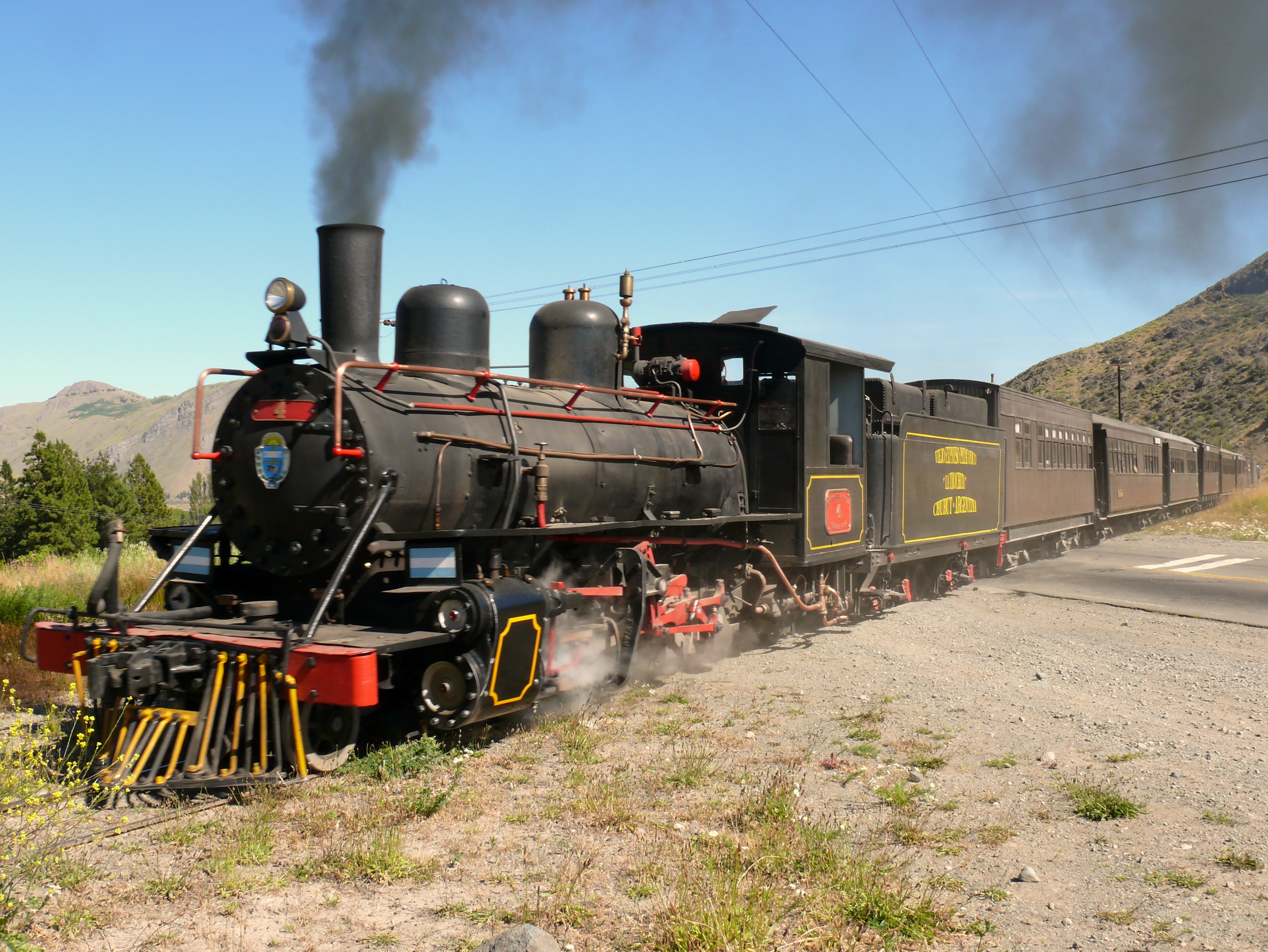
- La Trochita pictured in 2010

Overview
- Other name: Old Patagonian Express
- Native name: Viejo Expreso Patagónico
- Status: Active
- Locale: Patagonia, Argentina
- Termini: El Maitén; Esquel
- Website: latrochita.org.ar

Service
- System: Inter-city

History
- Opened: 1935; 91 years ago

Technical
- Track gauge: 750 mm (2 ft 5 1/2 in)
Route map
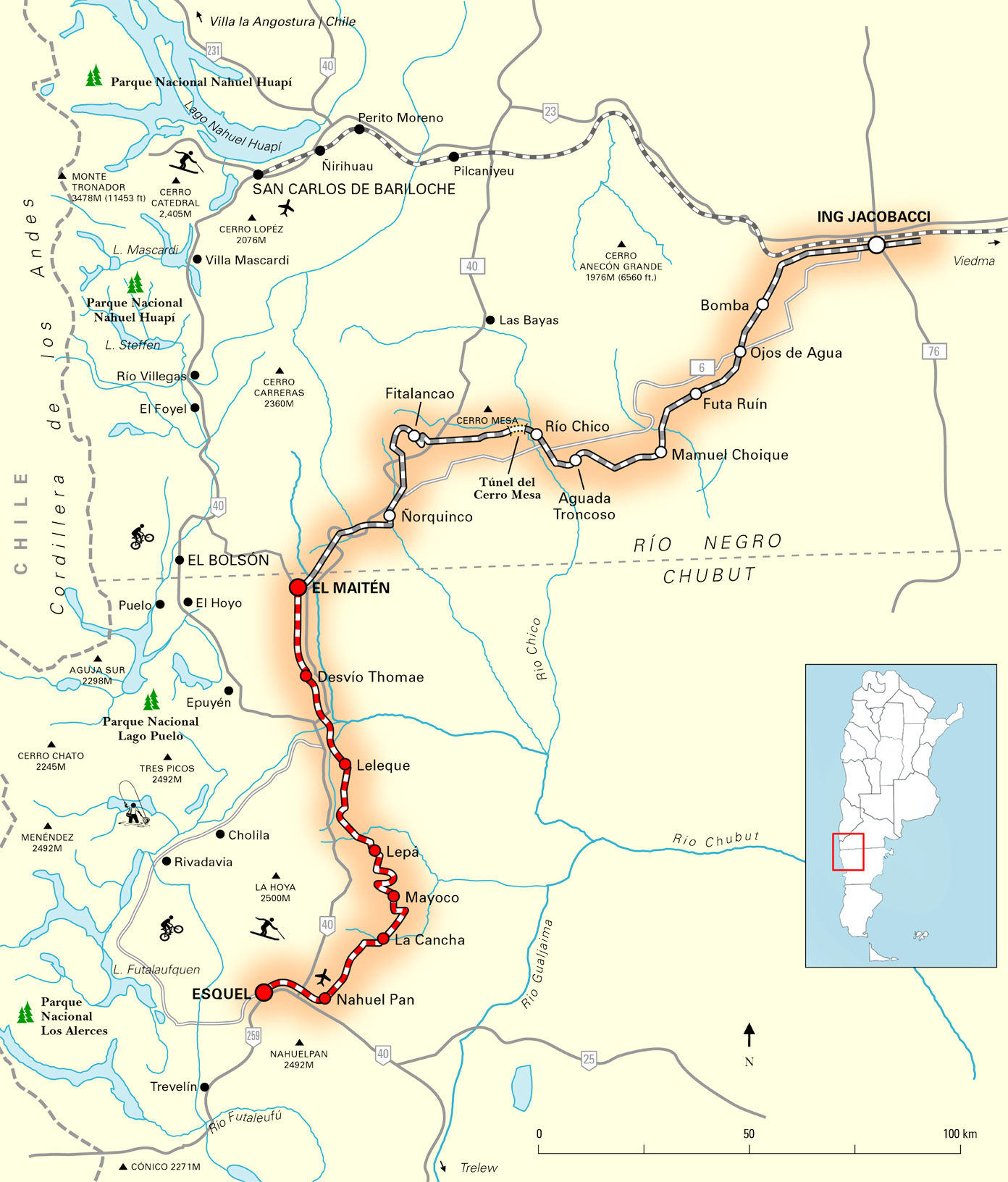

La Trochita (official name: Viejo Expreso Patagónico), in English known as the Old Patagonian Express, is a 750 mm (2 ft 5 1/2 in) narrow gauge railway in Patagonia, Argentina using steam locomotives. The nickname La Trochita means literally "The little gauge" though it is sometimes translated as "The Little Narrow Gauge" in Spanish while "trocha estrecha", "trocha angosta" in Argentina, is often used for a generic description of "narrow gauge."

The Trochita railway is 402 km in length and runs through the foothills of the Andes between Esquel and El Maitén in Chubut Province and Ingeniero Jacobacci in Río Negro Province, originally it was part of Ferrocarriles Patagónicos, a network of railways in southern Argentina. Nowadays, with its original character largely unchanged, it operates as a heritage railway and was made internationally famous by the 1978 Paul Theroux book The Old Patagonian Express, which described it as the railway almost at the end of the world. Theroux had sought to ride trains as far as possible into southern Argentina but did not include in his adventures the several railroads which were further south than Esquel, presumably because they were not considered operational or with sufficient connection to larger lines.

In 1991 a documentary was made of the railway by film maker Nick Lera.

== History ==
=== Plans ===
Route track elevation

In 1908, the Government of Argentina planned a network of railways across Patagonia. Two main lines would join San Carlos de Bariloche in the central Andes with the sea ports of San Antonio Oeste on the Atlantic coast to the east, and Puerto Deseado on the coast to the south east. Branches were to be built to connect the mainline with Buenos Aires Lake (connecting at Las Heras) and Comodoro Rivadavia (connecting at Sarmiento). Colonia 16 de Octubre – the Esquel and Trevelin area – would be connected via a branch line to Ingeniero Jacobacci. The whole network would connect to Buenos Aires via San Antonio Oeste.

The project ran out of steam following ministerial changes and the start of World War I which affected the economy of Argentina and the input of technology and investment required from Europe. The northern main line from the coast reached Ingeniero Jacobacci in 1916. 282 km (175 mi) of the southern main line from Deseado to Las Heras, and the 197 km (122 mi) branch line from Comodoro Rivadavia to Sarmiento were laid, but never connected with each other or the northern network. After 1916, the only further work was the completion of the link from Jacobacci to Bariloche, finished in 1934.

=== Esquel line ===
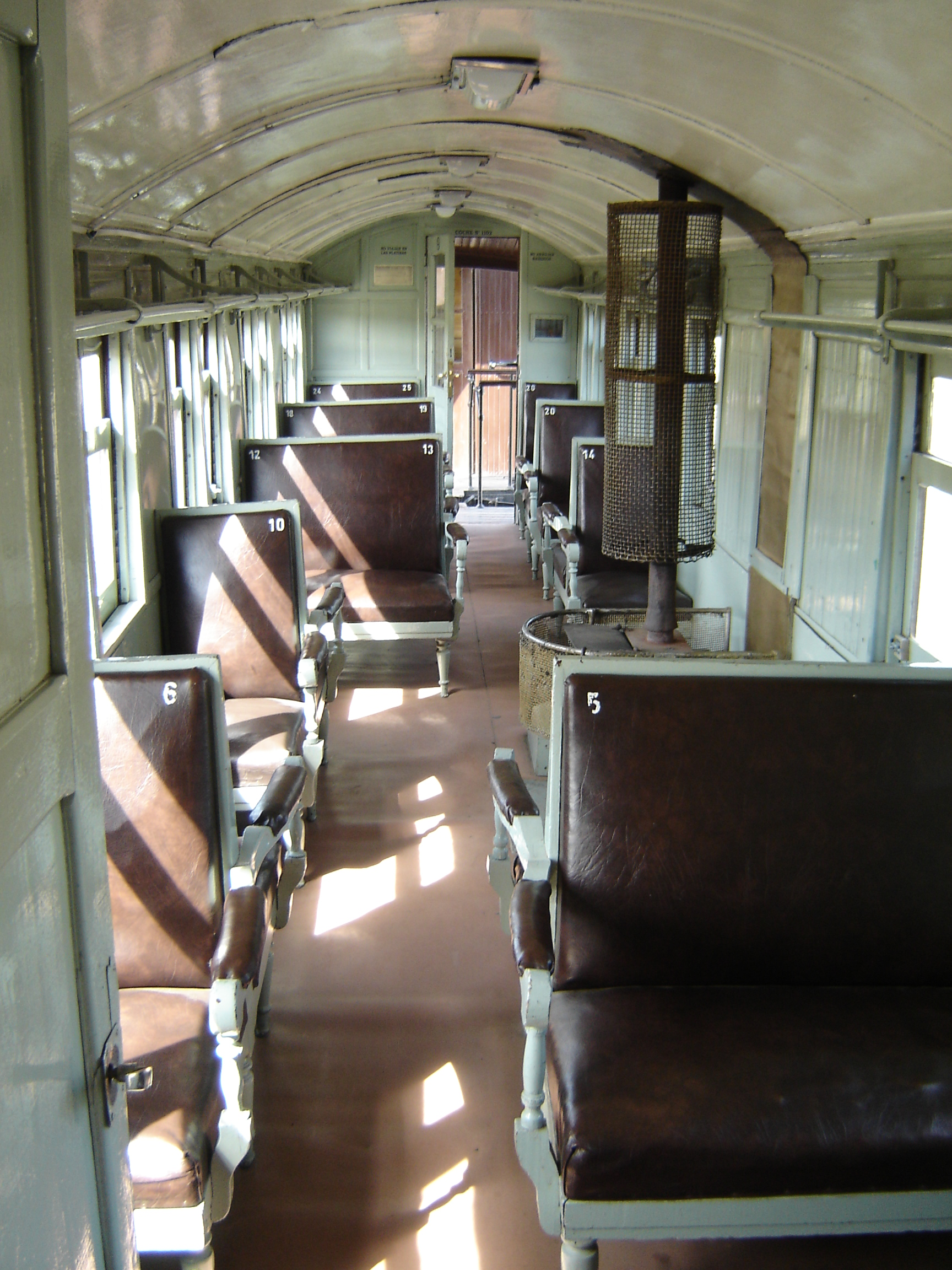
Interior of 1922 coach, with a wood burning furnace

The exception was the Esquel line. After the end of the First World War, narrow gauge track and facilities were plentiful and cheaper, given their extensive use at the front for supplies and troop movement. 600 mm (1 ft 11 5/8 in) Decauville railroads were used extensively in Buenos Aires Province in rural areas and to carry freight. For passenger services, locomotives for 750 mm (2 ft 5 1/2 in) track were readily available and it was decided to pursue this cheaper option. In 1921 it was agreed to lay down the Jacobacci-Esquel line, and also to connect it with the existing private 1,000 mm (3 ft 3 3/8 in) gauge railway in the Chubut Valley from Dolavon to Puerto Madryn. This would be the Patagonian Light Railways Network.

Belgian coaches and freight wagons were ordered in 1922, plus fifty locomotives from Henschel & Sohn, a German company in Cassel (today spelt Kassel). Later 25 more locomotives were bought from the Baldwin Locomotive Works in Philadelphia, U.S.

The first part of the project was to lay a third rail inside the existing tracks at Jacobacci and the Chubut Valley so that they could be used by the narrow gauge vehicles. New tracks were laid to extend the Chubut Valley line from Trelew to Rawson at the coast and westwards to Las Plumas. After floods destroyed much of the line in 1931–1932, work began again in 1934 with new plans, with a 105 m (344 ft)-long bridge and a 110 m (360 ft)-long tunnel to be built. 1,000 labourers worked in the harsh Patagonian environment, many later settling.

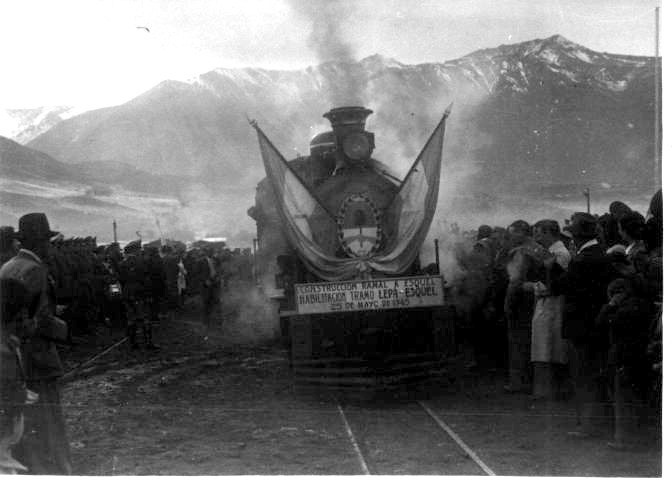
Inaugural trip to Esquel, on May 25, 1945

Trains began to run on the completed parts of the line in 1935. In 1941 the line reached El Maitén, where maintenance facilities were built. The first train to Esquel entered the city on May 25, 1945. After President Juan Perón's nationalisation of the railway network in 1948, the Trochita became part of General Roca Railway.

Until 1950 the line was a freight-only service. The first passenger service launched in 1950 and connected Esquel with Buenos Aires (arriving at Constitución station), changing trains at Jacobacci. Passengers would occupy loose wooden benches around a stove which could be used for light cooking and above all to prepare mate and keep warm. The bends of the line in the Andean foothills and the slow speed of the network allowed passengers to walk alongside the train on certain sections along the 14-hour journey.

The service was much used for freight through the 1960s and 1970s, contributing to the development of the area, especially the construction of the dam on the Futaleufú River and the growth of El Maitén thanks to the locomotive maintenance operation.

=== Decline ===
In 1961, the line in the lower Chubut valley between Puerto Madryn and Las Plumas was closed, never having been connected with the Esquel or Bariloche lines. In the 1970s the two isolated lines to the south also shut down.

La Trochita also began to decline, due to the improvement of the road network and of trucks and buses, and the difficulties of maintaining a railway so far from the country's capital and the global rail industry. However over the same period, Patagonia had been 'discovered' by tourists and La Trochita was something of a backpacker highlight. Theroux's book brought it to wider attention and gave the railway a name – The Old Patagonian Express – which highlighted its timeless appeal both to Argentine nostalgics and tourists. In 1991, the railway was filmed for an episode of Nick Lera's World Steam Classics.

Nevertheless, the line was not profitable. Given the communities it served, private investors were not interested in making necessary investment. In 1992, under the liberal economic practices of the central government, it was decided to close the line. However, there was a national and even an international outcry at the decision to close a line which had become emblematic of a bygone age and of that region. The two provincial governments came together to keep the line open.

== The Trochita today ==
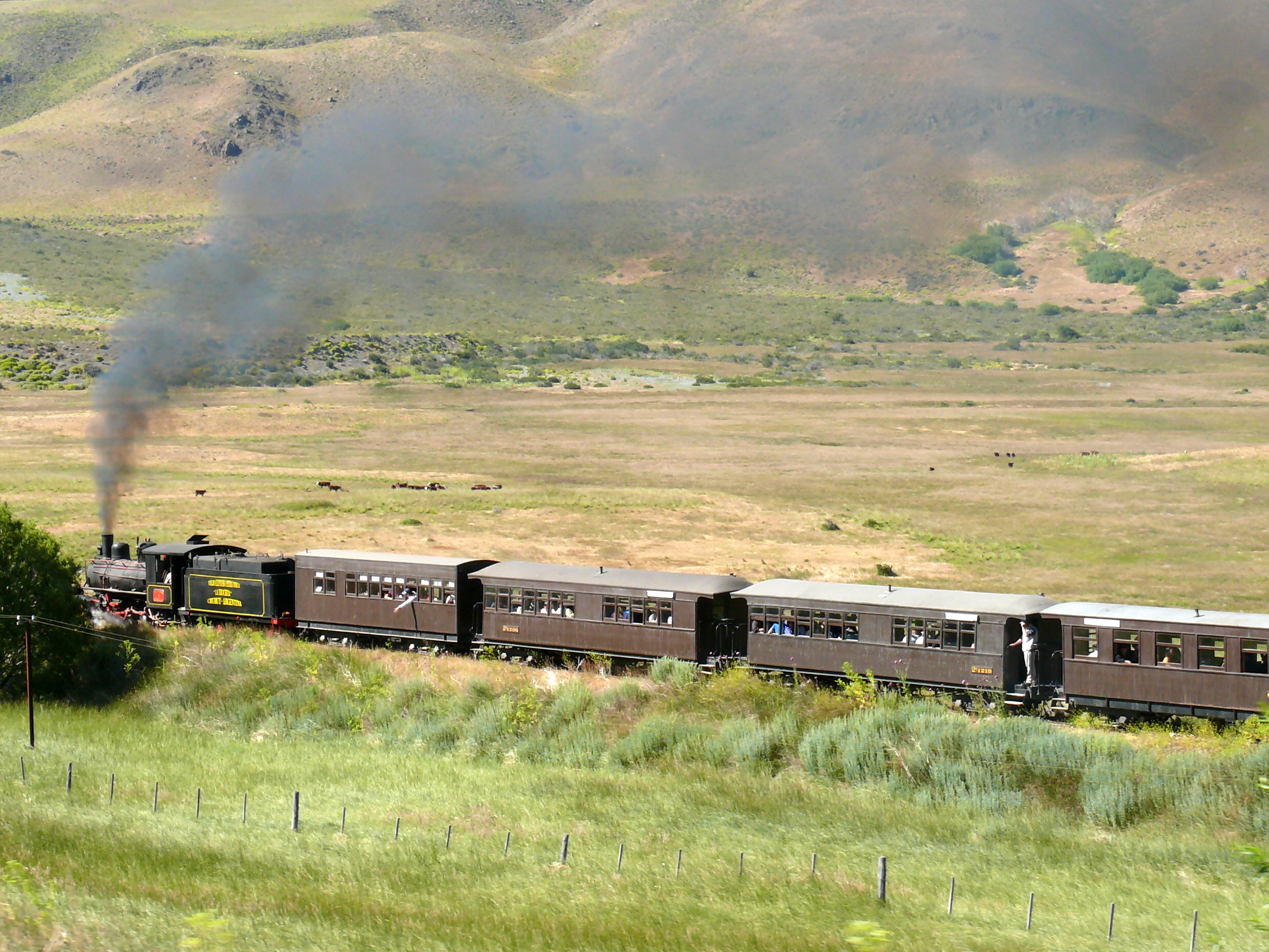
La Trochita running on the sparsely populated Patagonian region, 2010

The line is in possession of 22 steam locomotives, 11 Henschel and 11 Baldwin Mikado type locomotives, seven of which are currently operable, two Baldwin and three Henschel in the El Maitén – Esquel section, and 2 Baldwin locomotives in the Ingeniero Jacobacci section. The locomotives are oil fired and have been in continuous service since its introduction. There are no diesel engines in use anywhere on the line. The present rolling stock as the locomotives date from 1922, with the exception of the dining car and some first class carriages that were constructed in 1955.

The train no longer runs between Esquel and El Maitén; instead two special tourist services run (i) between Esquel and the settlement of Nahuel Pan and (ii) between El Maitén and Desvío Thomae.

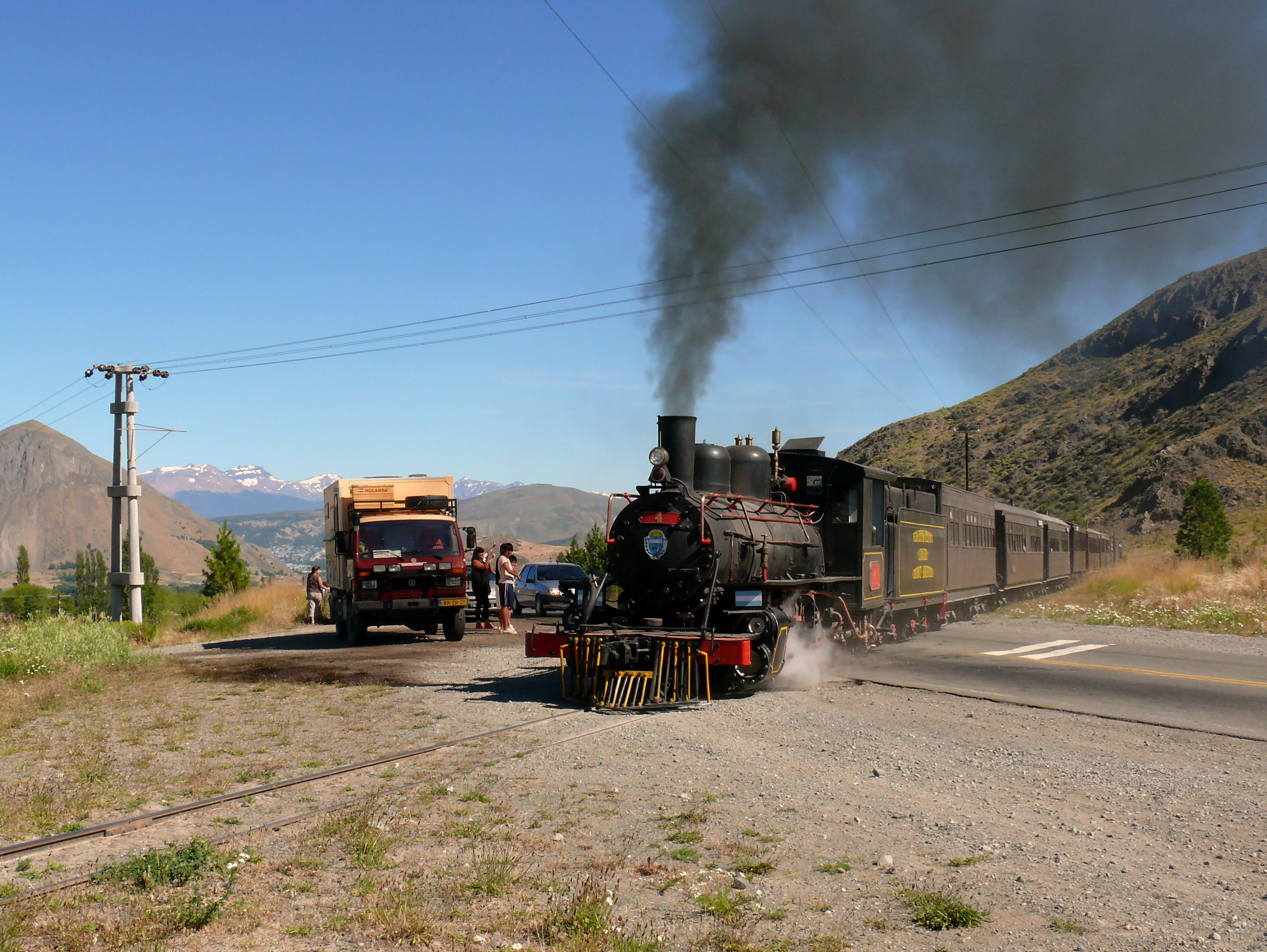
La Trochita crossing national route 259 in Chubut, 2010

The journey from Esquel to El Maitén took almost seven hours. There is a regular tourist service which offers a return trip to the first station and back which takes about an hour. As of 2010, tickets for the tourist services are ARS$150 round-trip, and a discount to $80 for residents of Argentina.

The maintenance of the original 1922 locomotives is increasingly difficult, due to the lack of parts and expertise, and the remoteness of his base in El Maitén. This can cause frequent delays or service shut-downs.

The Government of Argentina declared La Trochita as a National Historic Monument in 1999.

In 2003, "Friends of La Trochita Association” was created by members mainly from Esquel, El Maitén and Bariloche.

In May 2011, high winds ripped the roof off one car. The roof fell down in between two cars, derailed one which then caused the entire train to derail and roll over. No one was seriously injured and the locomotive and cars were all recovered by June 1, 2011.

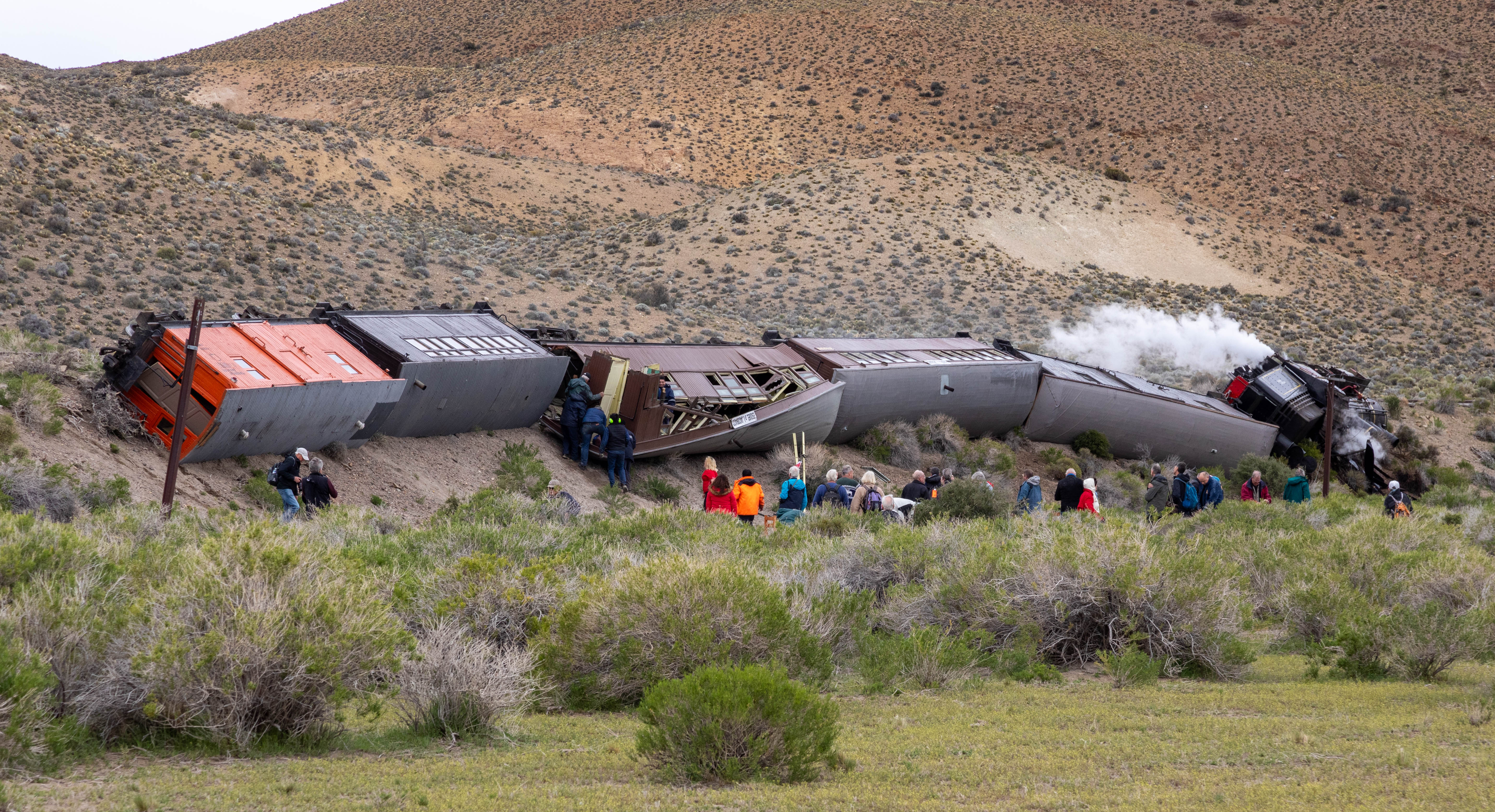
La Trochita derailment - 2023

In November 2023, an excursion derailed in between Mamuel Choique and Rio Chico. The entire train fell on its side, causing injuries to four of the passengers aboard. The Henschel & Sohn 2-8-2 steam locomotive number 114, built in 1922, encountered unexpected erosion on this embankment, derailed, and rolled onto its side taking all of the vintage wooden railcars along with it. Nearly 60 passengers (mostly British and American) and crew were onboard this private charter, but, miraculously, there were no fatalities and most people escaped with no or minor injuries (cuts and bruises). A wood stove in one of the cars started a fire, but it was extinguished. The train was bound for Ñorquinco on a chartered run.

== Gallery ==
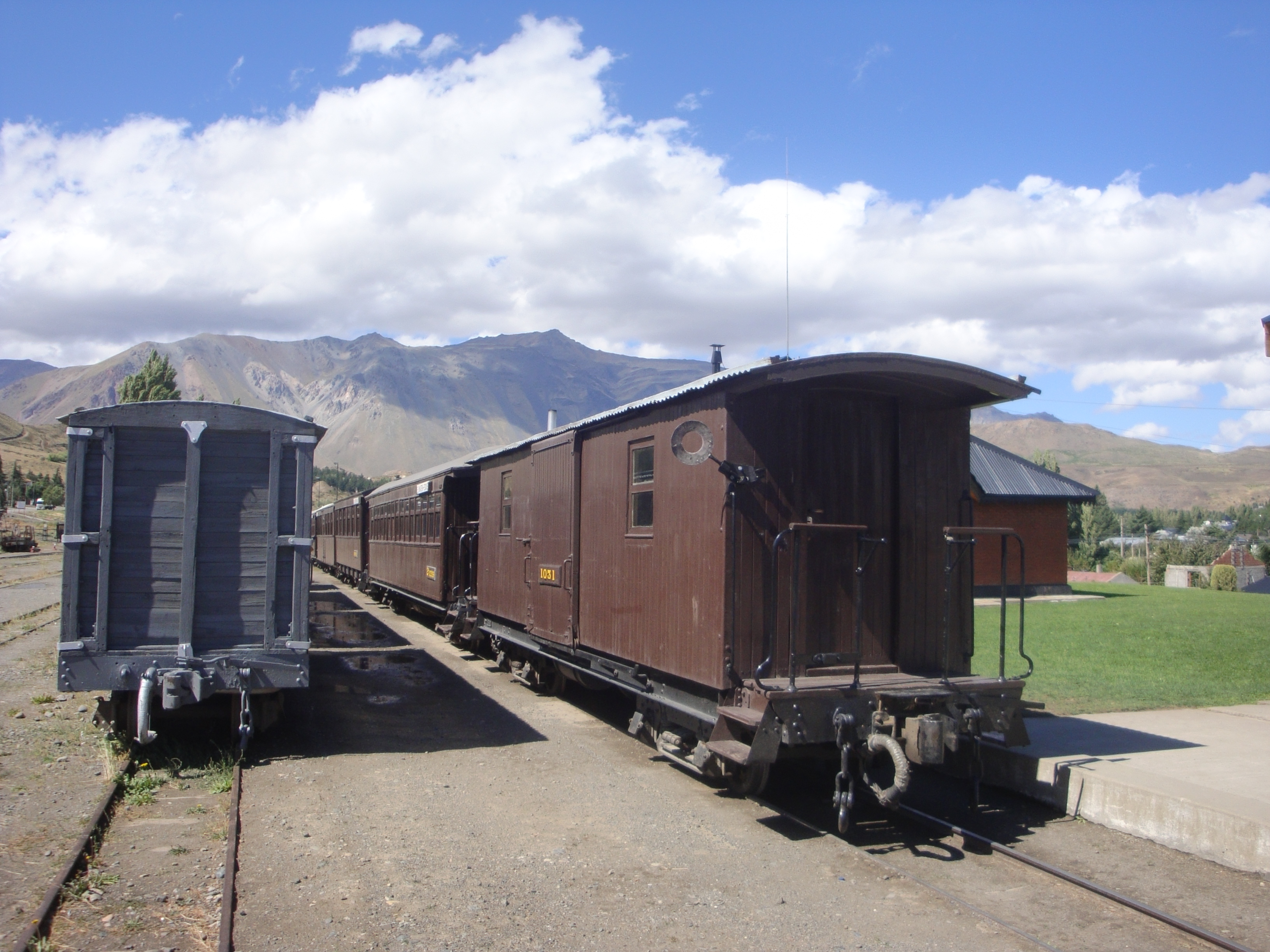
Formations stationed in Esquel station

Crossing bridge in El Maitén

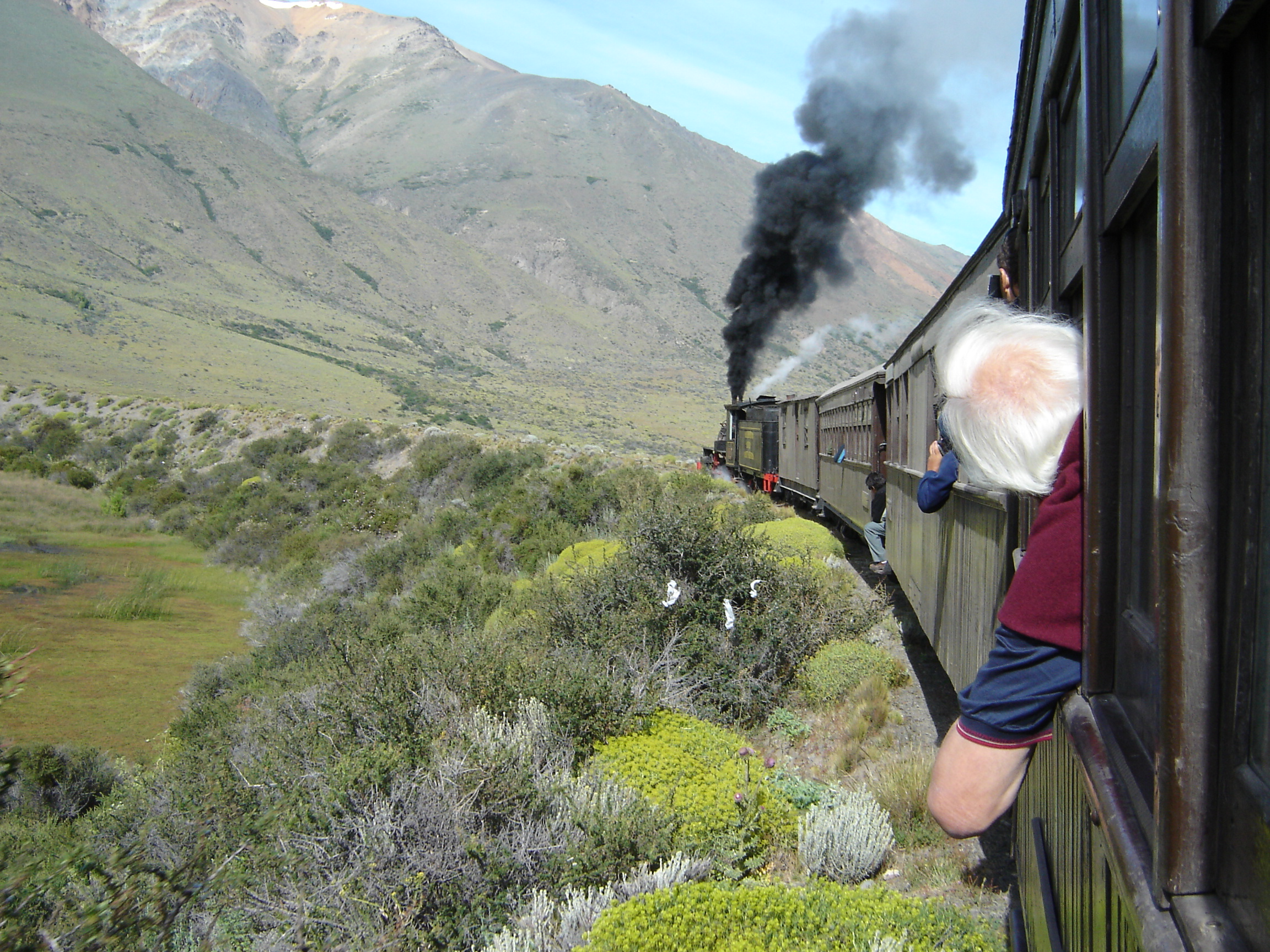
In a curve to Nahuel Pan

Crossing bridge over Río Chico

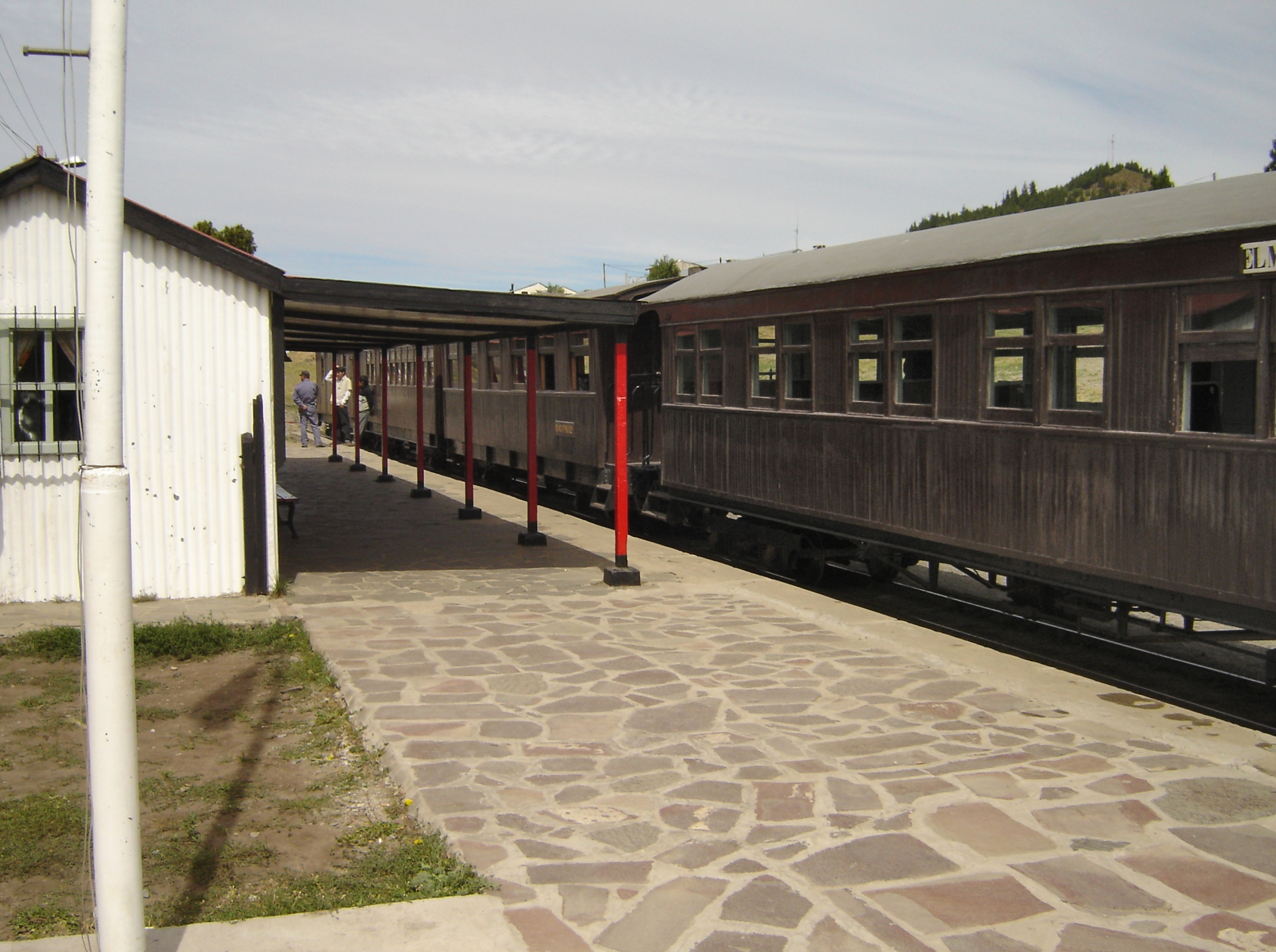
Train at Esquel station

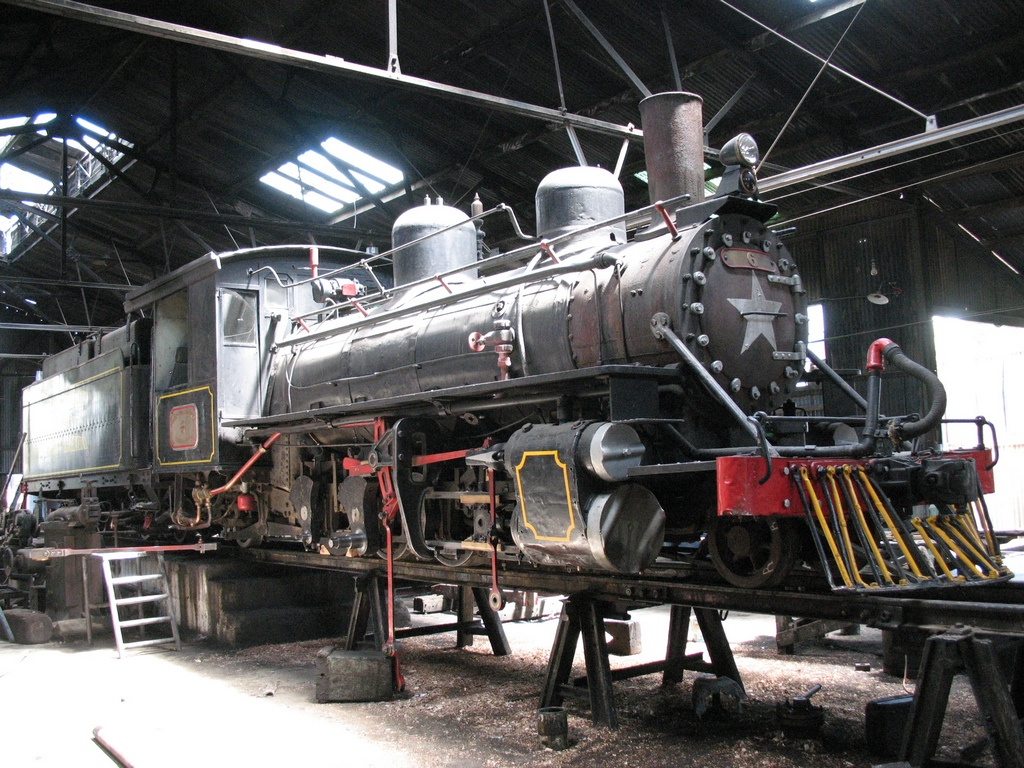
A locomotive at workshop

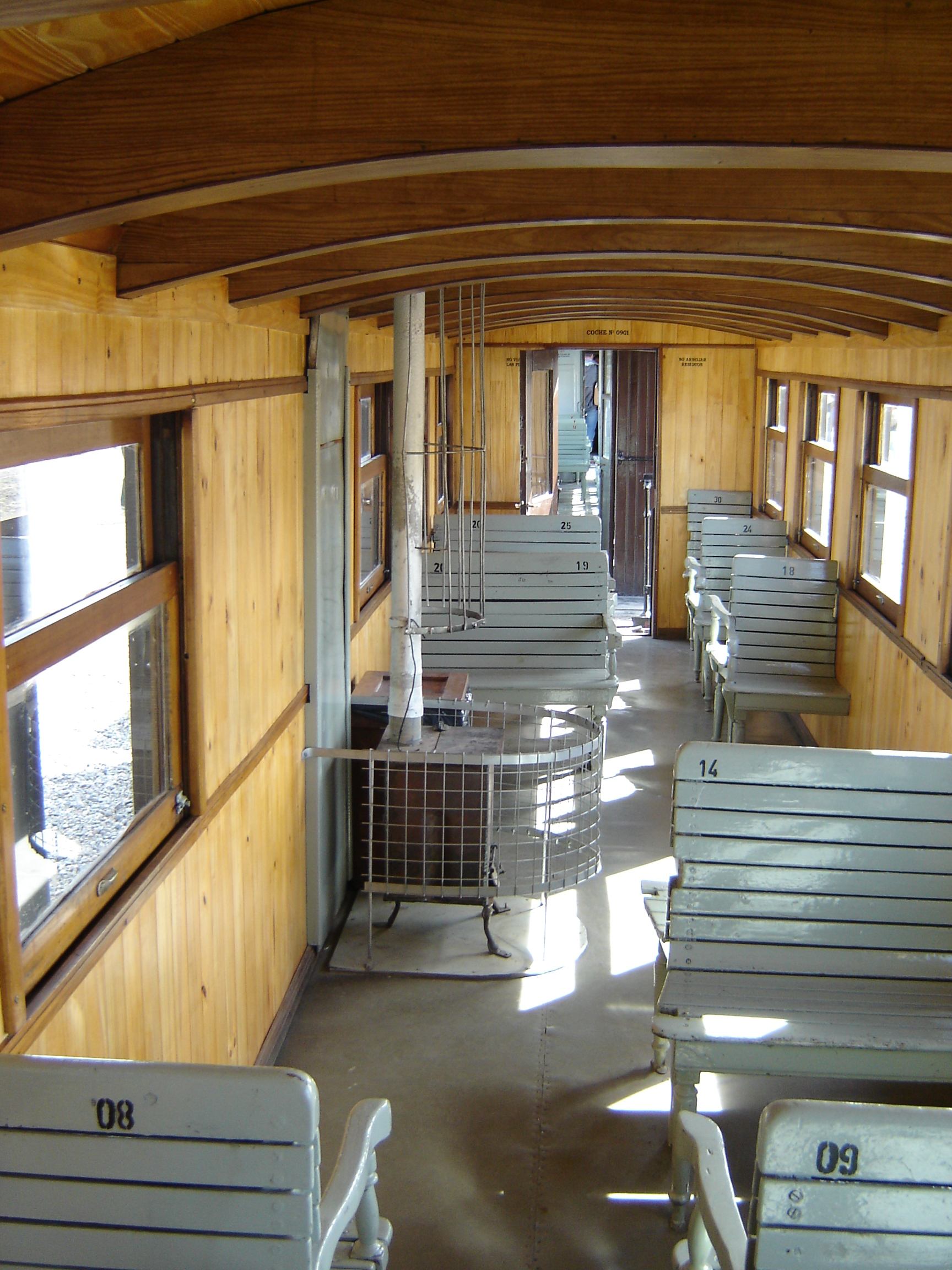
Standard coach interior

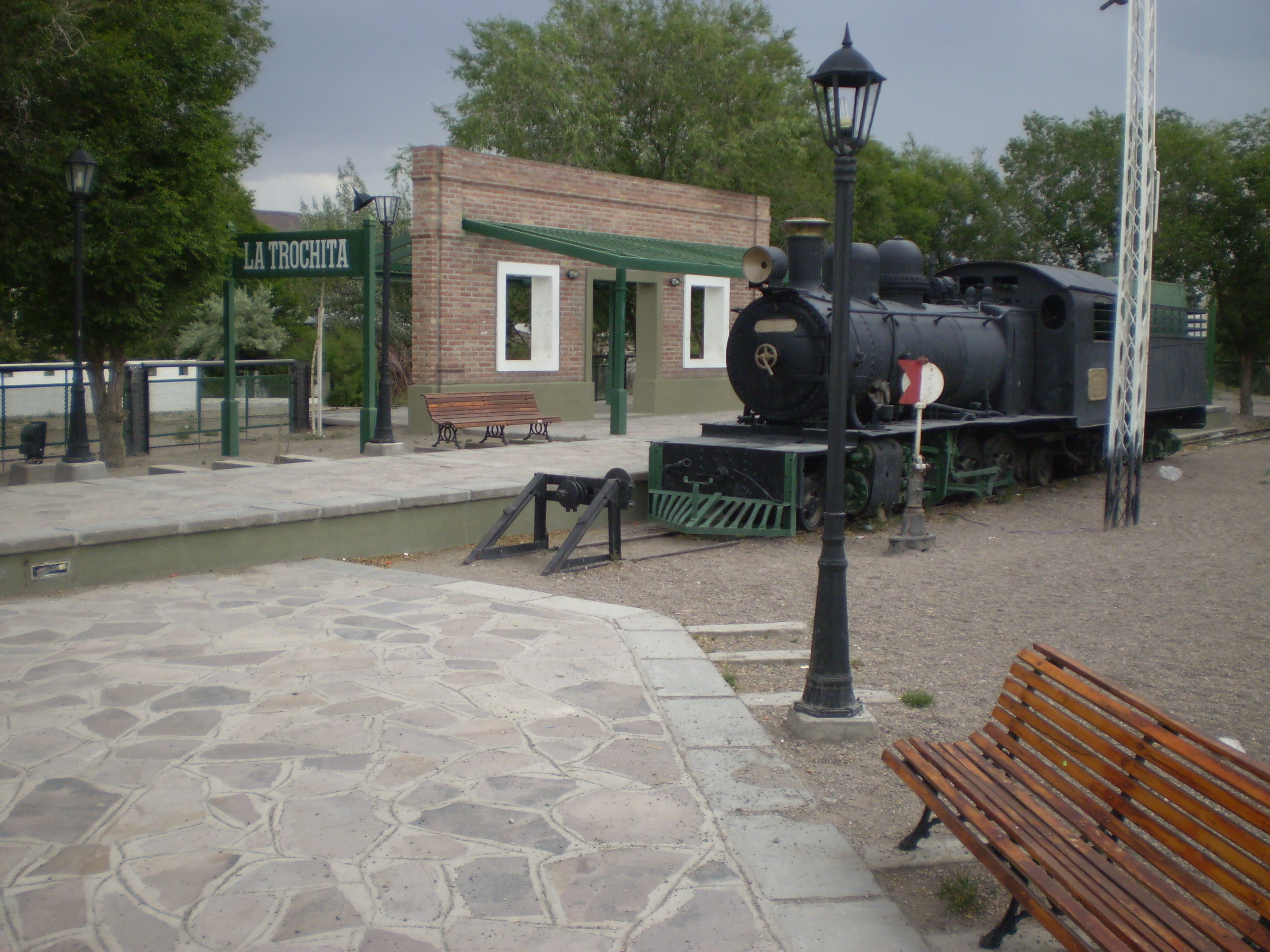
Ing. Jacobacci, former terminus

El Maitén station

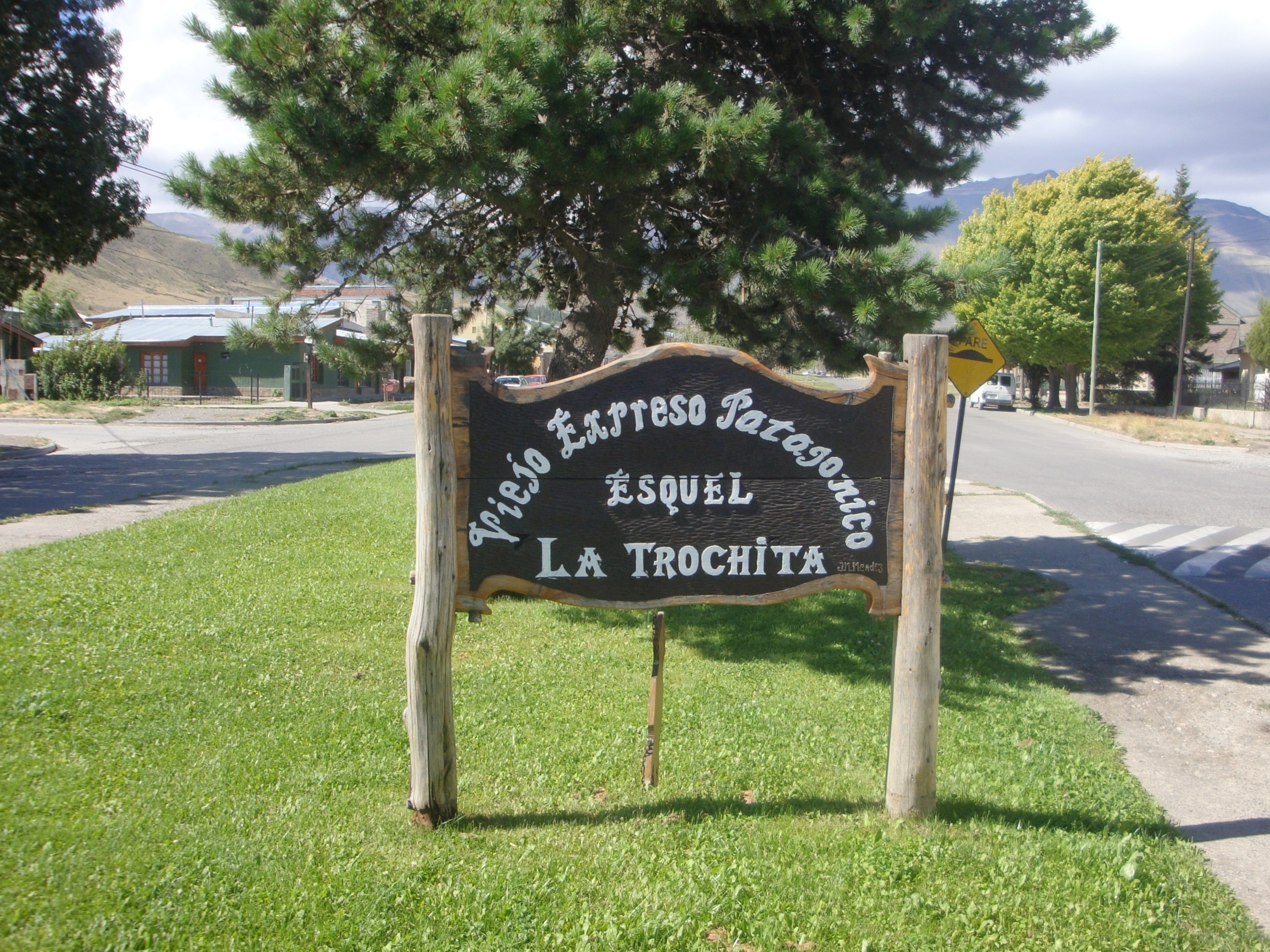
Esquel station sign

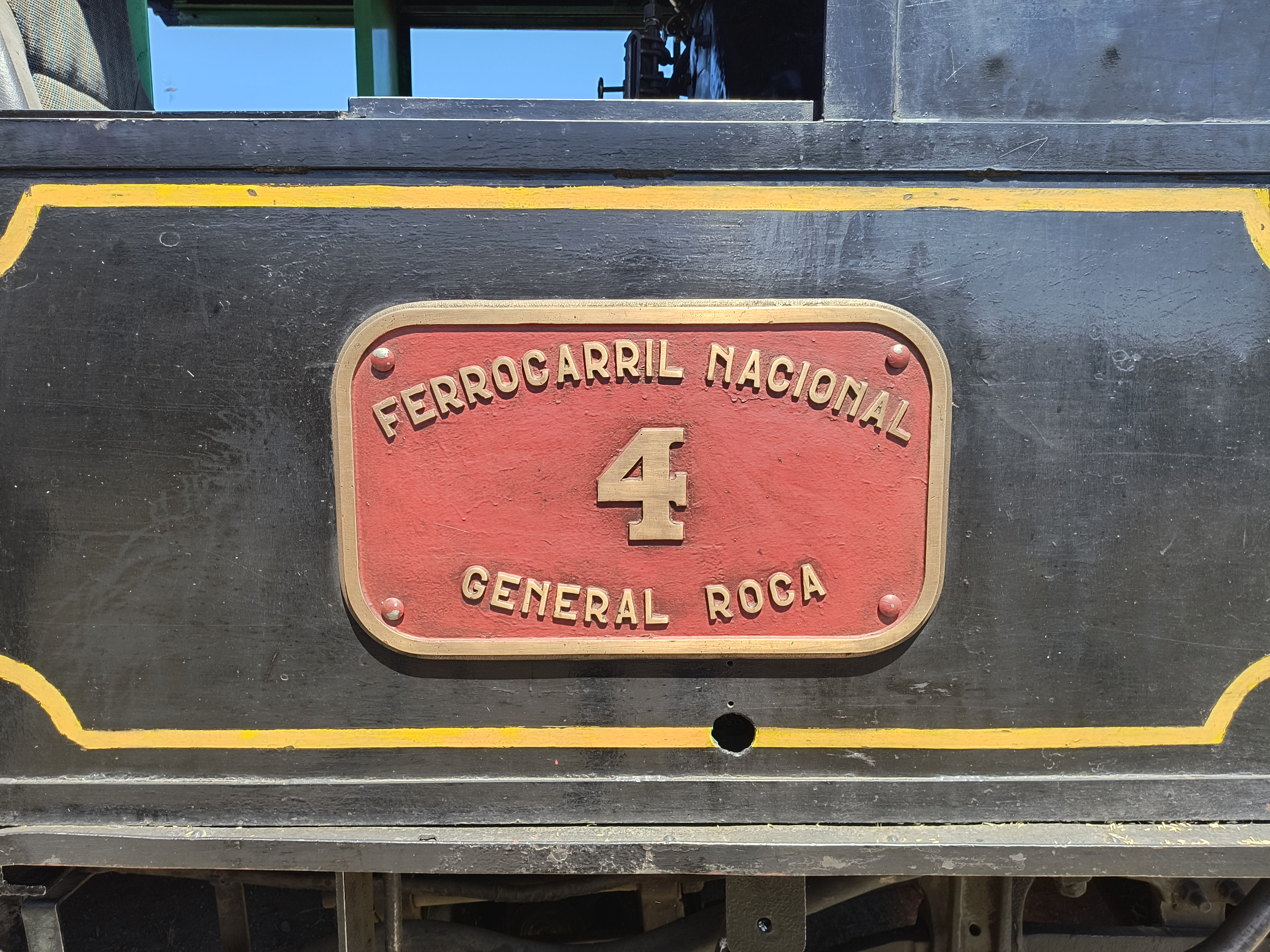
Locomotive numberplate

== See also ==
- List of heritage railways
- Railways of Argentina

== Bibliography ==
- D.S. Purdom, British Steam on the Pampas – Text: English, Mechanical Engineering Publications Ltd, London (1977)
- Theroux Paul, Old Patagonian Express – Text: English, Houghton Mifflin (1979) - ISBN 0-395-27788-4 - ISBN 978-0-395-27788-1 ISBN 978-0-395-52105-2
- Sepiurka Sergio Miglioli, La Trochita – (Bilingual Edition; English/Spanish), Grupo Abierto Communicaciones (2001) - ISBN 987-97830-5-0 - ISBN 978-987-97830-5-4
- Taylorson Keith, Narrow Gauge Rails to Esquel – Text: English, Plateway Press, 23 Hanover St., Brighton, BN2 2ST, UK (1999)
