= Cholila, Argentina =

Town in Chubut Province, Argentina

Coordinates: 42°31′0″S 71°27′0″W

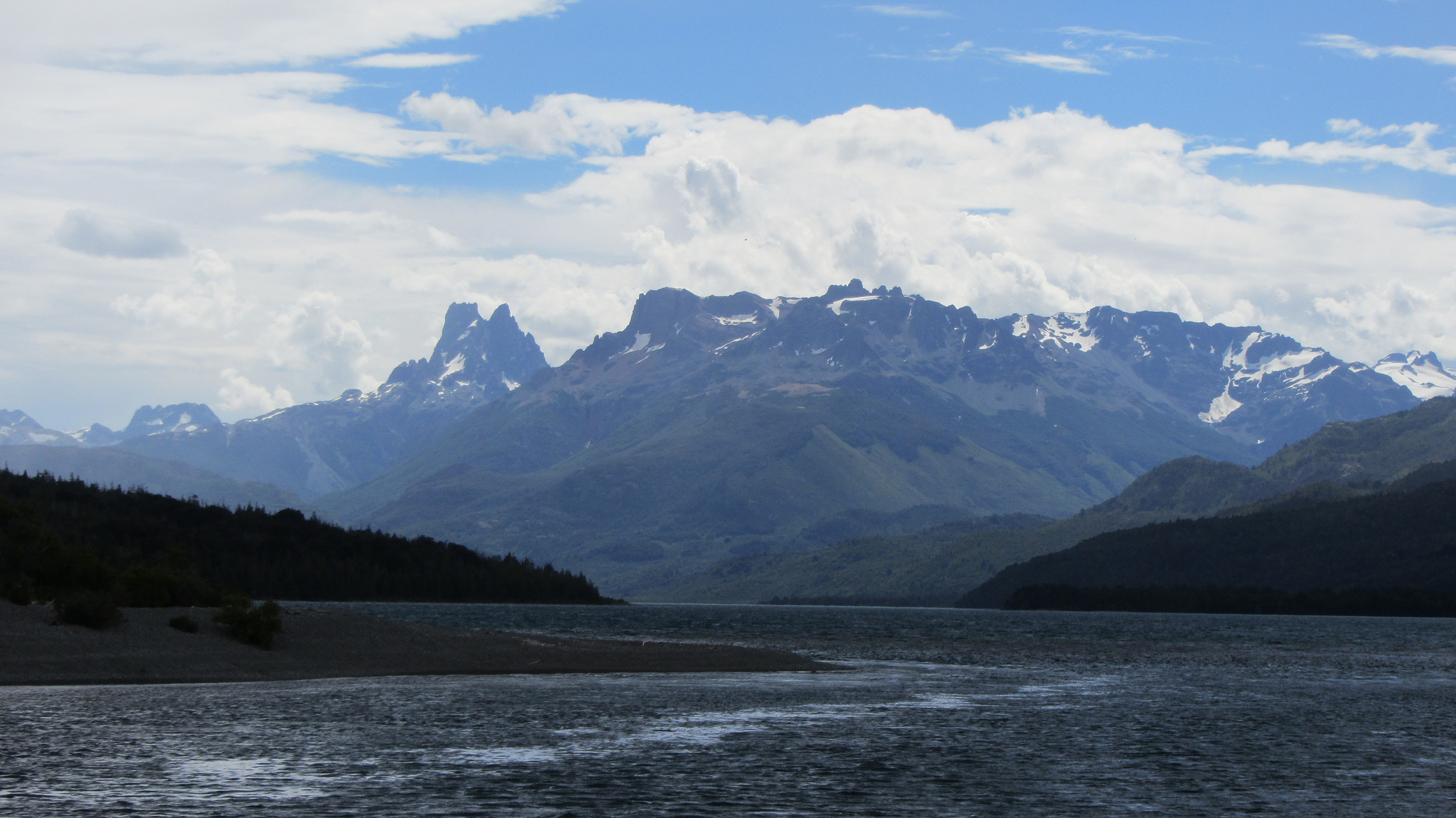
Lake Cholila and Cerro dos Picos.

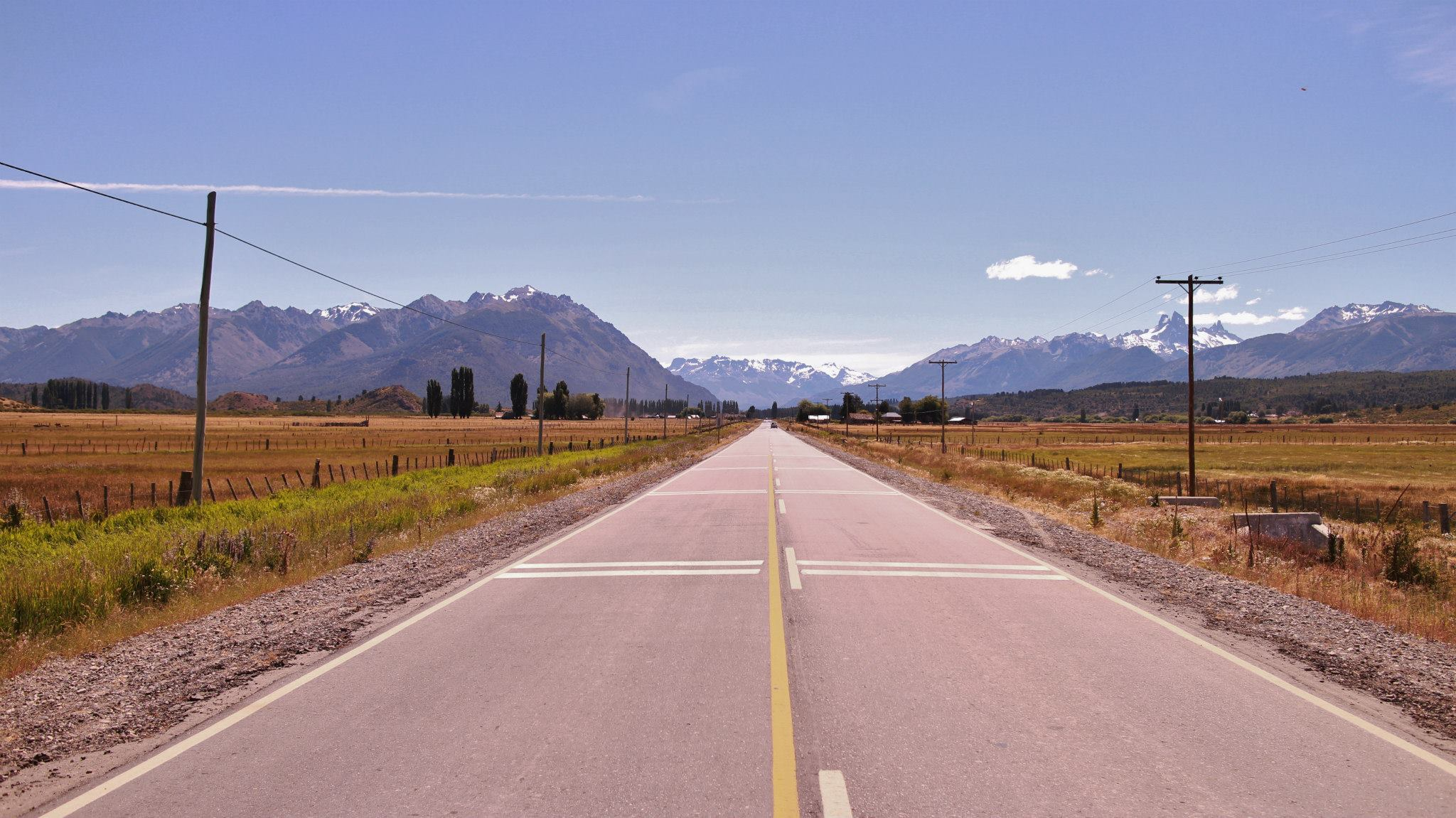
The countryside west of Cholila. Cerro dos Picos (Two Peak Mountain), 2,525 metres (8,284 ft), is in right center.

Cholila, Argentina is a town located in Cushamen Department, Chubut Province, Argentina. It is located in Patagonia. The population of the town in 2010 was 1,560 and its elevation above sea level was 560 metres (1,840 ft) Cholila is located a few hundred meters from Pellegrini Lake, also called Lago de los Mosquitos, 461 hectares (1,140 acres) in surface area. Cholila sits at the foot of the Andes. Lake Cholila is located 18 kilometres (11 mi) in a straight line distance west north-west of the town.

== Climate ==
Cholila has a Csb climate (Mild temperate, warm dry summers, cool wet winters) by the Köppen climate classification system. The climate is classified as Cslk (Mediterranean temperate, mild summers, cool winters) by the Trewartha climate classification.

Climate data for Cholila, Chubut, Argentina. 42 31N, 71 27W. Elevation: 560 metres (1,840 ft)
Month	Jan	Feb	Mar	Apr	May	Jun	Jul	Aug	Sep	Oct	Nov	Dec	Year
Mean daily maximum °C (°F)	21.0 (69.8)	21.0 (69.8)	18.0 (64.4)	14.0 (57.2)	10.0 (50.0)	6.0 (42.8)	6.0 (42.8)	8.0 (46.4)	11.0 (51.8)	14.0 (57.2)	17.0 (62.6)	19.0 (66.2)	13.7 (56.7)
Daily mean °C (°F)	14.0 (57.2)	13.5 (56.3)	11.0 (51.8)	8.0 (46.4)	5.0 (41.0)	2.0 (35.6)	2.0 (35.6)	3.5 (38.3)	5.5 (41.9)	7.5 (45.5)	10.5 (50.9)	12.5 (54.5)	7.9 (46.2)
Mean daily minimum °C (°F)	7.0 (44.6)	6.0 (42.8)	4.0 (39.2)	2.0 (35.6)	0.0 (32.0)	−2.0 (28.4)	−2.0 (28.4)	−1.0 (30.2)	0.0 (32.0)	1.0 (33.8)	4.0 (39.2)	6.0 (42.8)	2.1 (35.8)
Average precipitation mm (inches)	22 (0.9)	18 (0.7)	21 (0.8)	38 (1.5)	79 (3.1)	86 (3.4)	74 (2.9)	58 (2.3)	38 (1.5)	26 (1.0)	20 (0.8)	26 (1.0)	506 (19.9)
Source: "Cholila, Argentina",

== Butch Cassidy ==
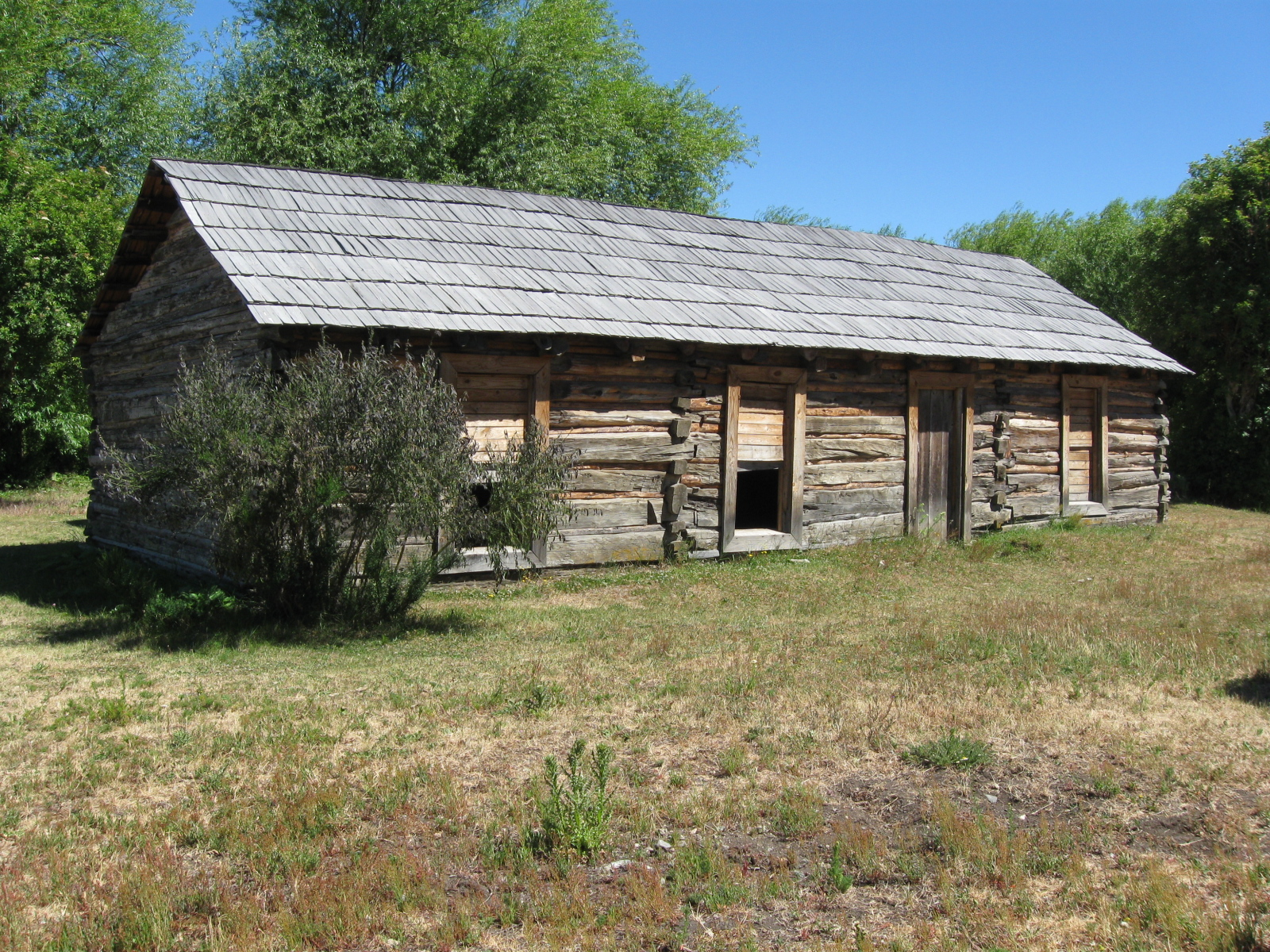
Butch Cassidy's cabin near Cholila.

The American outlaw Butch Cassidy, his partner, the Sundance Kid, and Sundance's girl friend Etta Place bought a ranch near Cholila in 1901 and lived there until about 1905. Their cabin, 12 kilometres (7.5 mi) north of the village, was visited by travel author Bruce Chatwin in the 1970s and was in a dilapidated state. In 2007, the cabin was partially restored. Cassidy, Sundance, and Place bought a 5,000 hectares (12,000 acres) ranch near Cholila and raised sheep, cattle, and horses. They were apparently forced to sell the ranch and flee because Pinkerton detectives discovered their location. They were tipped off by a local sheriff that Pinkerton agents were coming for them.
