= August 2023 Chilean winter storm =

Weather event in Chile

The August 2023 Chilean winter storm was a winter storm affecting Central Chile. The regions spanning from Valparaíso in the north to Bío Bío in the south were impacted. Three people died as a consequence of the events. The total number of affected people was counted as 33,234 and 42,120 people were left temporarily isolated due to the shutdown of roads. By August 23 and 24, damages to houses were counted as following; 21,832 houses with minor damage, 2,899 with major damage and 44 houses destroyed and while the impact on 1,509 houses was still being evaluated.

== See also ==
- June 2023 Chilean winter storm
- White Earthquake
