= Epuyén =

- Municipality and village
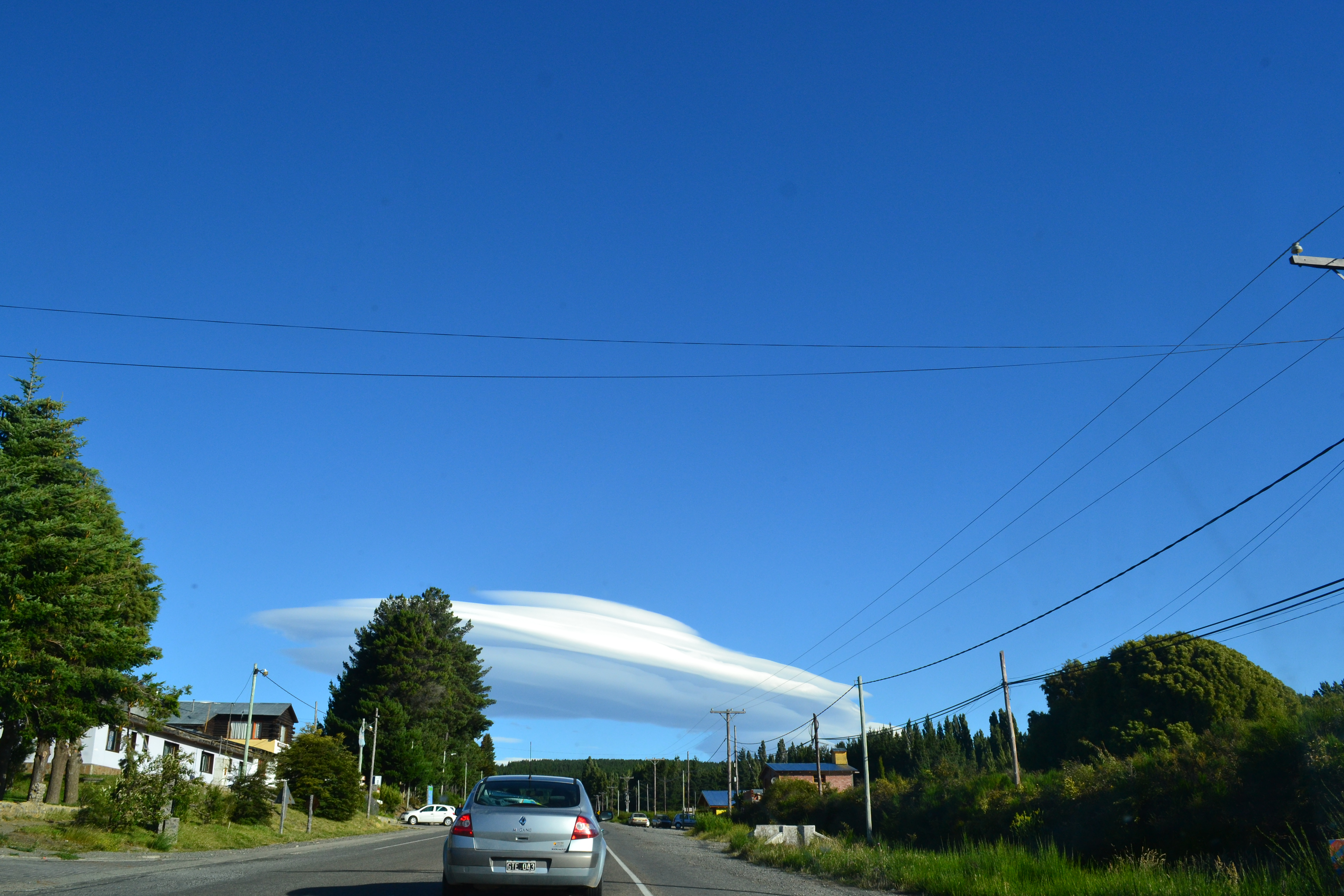

- Location of Epuyén in Argentina
- Coordinates: 42°14′00″S 71°21′00″W
- Country: Argentina
- Province: Chubut Province
- Department: Cushamen Department
- Elevation: 2,051 ft (625 m)

Population (2010)
  - Total: 1,749
- Time zone: UTC−3 (ART)
- Climate: Dfb

Epuyén is a village and municipality in Chubut Province in southern Argentina.

== Geography ==
=== Climate ===
Using the 0 °C isotherm, the climate of this town is humid continental with Mediterranean influence (Dfb/Dsb, according to the Köppen climate classification), bordering on an oceanic climate (Cfb) and a cool-summer Mediterranean climate (Csb).

Climate data for Epuyén (modelled data)
Month	Jan	Feb	Mar	Apr	May	Jun	Jul	Aug	Sep	Oct	Nov	Dec	Year
Mean daily maximum °C (°F)	20.2 (68.4)	20.5 (68.9)	16.8 (62.2)	11.8 (53.2)	7.3 (45.1)	3.2 (37.8)	2.7 (36.9)	4.2 (39.6)	6.9 (44.4)	10.4 (50.7)	14.3 (57.7)	17.5 (63.5)	11.3 (52.4)
Daily mean °C (°F)	13.8 (56.8)	14.0 (57.2)	10.9 (51.6)	6.8 (44.2)	3.4 (38.1)	0.1 (32.2)	−0.6 (30.9)	0.6 (33.1)	2.4 (36.3)	5.2 (41.4)	8.5 (47.3)	12.5 (54.5)	6.5 (43.6)
Mean daily minimum °C (°F)	7.6 (45.7)	7.9 (46.2)	5.8 (42.4)	2.8 (37.0)	0.6 (33.1)	−2.3 (27.9)	−3.2 (26.2)	−2.2 (28.0)	−1.1 (30.0)	0.8 (33.4)	3.3 (37.9)	5.8 (42.4)	2.2 (35.8)
Average precipitation mm (inches)	37 (1.5)	35 (1.4)	49 (1.9)	83 (3.3)	112 (4.4)	154 (6.1)	129 (5.1)	126 (5.0)	68 (2.7)	76 (3.0)	59 (2.3)	53 (2.1)	981 (38.8)
Source: Climate-Data.org
