= The Gap (film) =

- Directed by: Mariano Mucci
- Written by: Mariano Mucci
- Starring: Valentina Bassi; Silvia Montanari; Erasmo Olivera; Leandro Orowitz; Mario Paolucci; Sandra Smith; Daniel Valenzuela; Mirta Wons; Luis Ziembrowsky
- Cinematography: Andrés Mazzon
- Edited by: José Castells
- Music by: Axel Krygier
- Distributed by: Cooperativa de Trabajo Kaos; Americine
- Release date: March 10, 2006
- Running time: 83 minutes
- Country: Argentina
- Language: Spanish

The Gap (Spanish: El boquete) is a 2006 Argentine comedy-drama film directed and written by Mariano Mucci. It stars Valentina Bassi and Daniel Valenzuela.

== Synopsis ==
When patriarch Escarfase (Mario Paolucci) is released from prison, he finds himself immediately drawn into a scheme concocted by the not-so-bright Rubén (Luis Ziembrowski). Their plan involves using an apparently deserted house as their base of operations for tunneling into the neighboring bank vault. Joining them in this endeavor is Escarfase's prostitute daughter Mirna (Valentina Bassi).
