= Buenos Aires Chico =

Coordinates: 42°05′S 71°14′W

- Municipality and village
- Interactive map of Buenos Aires Chico
- Country: Argentina
- Province: Chubut Province
- Time zone: UTC−3 (ART)

Buenos Aires Chico is a village and municipality in Chubut Province in southern Argentina.
