= Gualjaina =

Coordinates: 42°42′S 70°30′W

- Municipality and village
- Interactive map of Gualjaina
- Country: Argentina
- Province: Chubut Province
- Department: Cushamen Department
- Time zone: UTC−3 (ART)
- Climate: Csb

Gualjaina is a village and municipality in Chubut Province in southern Argentina.
