= Cushamen =

- Town
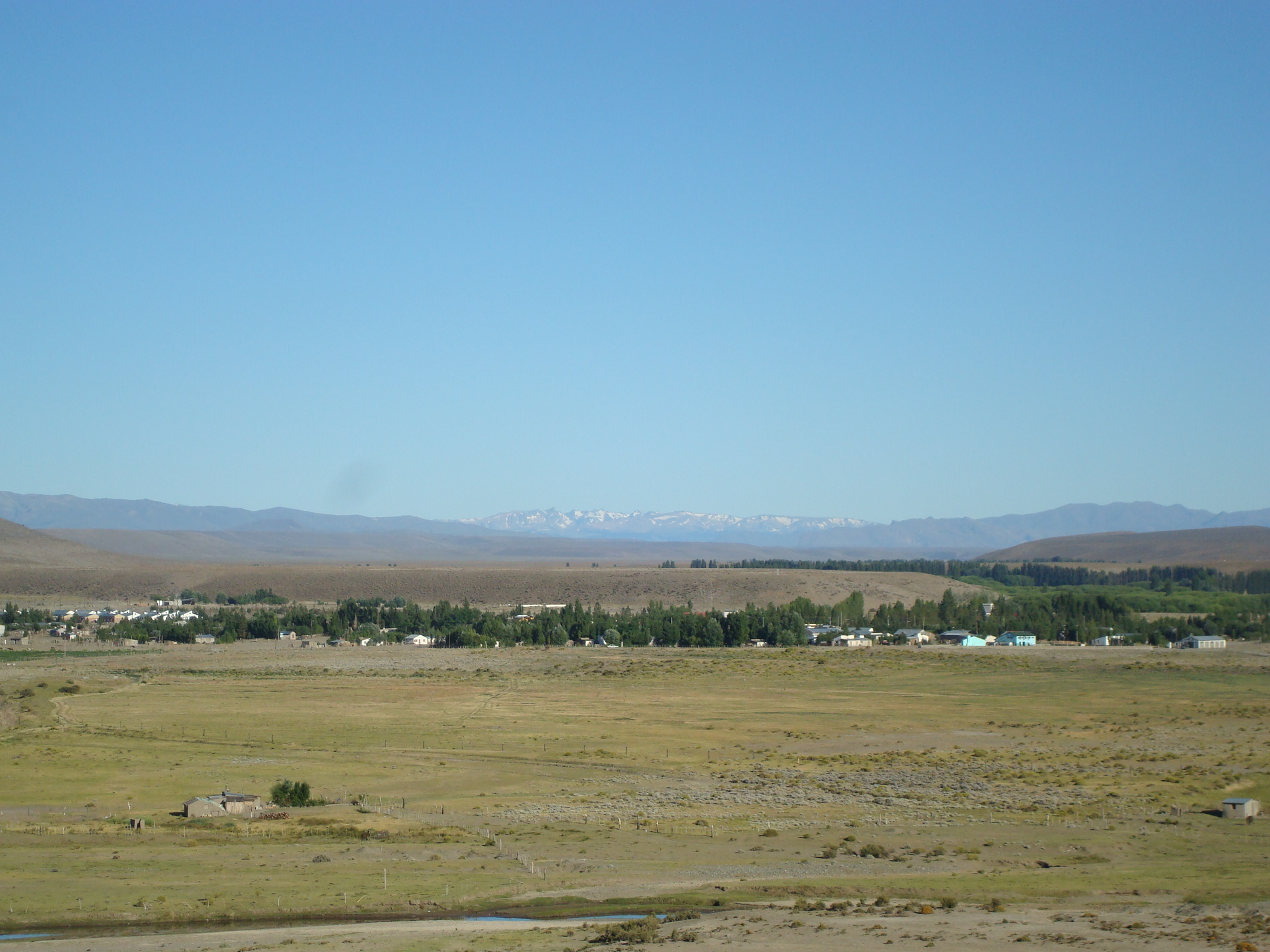

- Location of Cushamen in Argentina
- Coordinates: 42°22′S 71°02′W
- Country: Argentina
- Province: Chubut
- Department: Cushamen
- Elevation: 580 m (1,900 ft)

Population
  - Total: 580
- Time zone: UTC−3 (ART)
- CPA base: U9211
- Dialing code: +54 2945
- Climate: Csb

Cushamen is a town in Chubut Province, Argentina. It is the head town of the Cushamen Department.

Cushamen is located in the wild plains of Patagonia, its name means "place of solitude" in Mapuche.

The town is home to a Regional Indigenous Museum, which features various artefacts, including pottery and fabrics.

== Geography ==
=== Climate ===
Climate data for Cushamen
Month	Jan	Feb	Mar	Apr	May	Jun	Jul	Aug	Sep	Oct	Nov	Dec	Year
Record high °C (°F)	37.6 (99.7)	36.4 (97.5)	35.4 (95.7)	28.3 (82.9)	24.1 (75.4)	17.6 (63.7)	18.8 (65.8)	20.9 (69.6)	24.9 (76.8)	30.0 (86.0)	32.2 (90.0)	36.6 (97.9)	37.6 (99.7)
Mean daily maximum °C (°F)	27.7 (81.9)	25.5 (77.9)	23.7 (74.7)	18.5 (65.3)	13.4 (56.1)	10.8 (51.4)	9.6 (49.3)	11.8 (53.2)	14.7 (58.5)	19.7 (67.5)	21.6 (70.9)	24.9 (76.8)	18.8 (65.8)
Daily mean °C (°F)	19.0 (66.2)	16.9 (62.4)	14.7 (58.5)	10.0 (50.0)	6.8 (44.2)	4.6 (40.3)	3.5 (38.3)	4.9 (40.8)	7.2 (45.0)	11.0 (51.8)	13.5 (56.3)	16.6 (61.9)	11.0 (51.8)
Mean daily minimum °C (°F)	9.9 (49.8)	8.5 (47.3)	6.1 (43.0)	2.9 (37.2)	1.3 (34.3)	−0.4 (31.3)	−1.7 (28.9)	−0.8 (30.6)	0.6 (33.1)	2.3 (36.1)	5.1 (41.2)	7.7 (45.9)	3.7 (38.7)
Record low °C (°F)	2.0 (35.6)	1.0 (33.8)	−3.6 (25.5)	−8.6 (16.5)	−11.4 (11.5)	−14.0 (6.8)	−12.3 (9.9)	−13.1 (8.4)	−13.1 (8.4)	−4.3 (24.3)	−3.7 (25.3)	−1.3 (29.7)	−14.0 (6.8)
Average rainfall mm (inches)	10.6 (0.42)	12.4 (0.49)	10.8 (0.43)	9.9 (0.39)	26.6 (1.05)	20.7 (0.81)	19.0 (0.75)	22.6 (0.89)	6.3 (0.25)	2.3 (0.09)	5.5 (0.22)	13.2 (0.52)	118.5 (4.67)
Average relative humidity (%)	40.4	46.6	49.2	57.7	67.5	70.5	70.0	64.4	55.5	47.1	46.5	43.4	55.4
Source: Instituto Nacional de Tecnología Agropecuaria
