= Cushamen Department =

Cushamen
- Departamento Cushamen
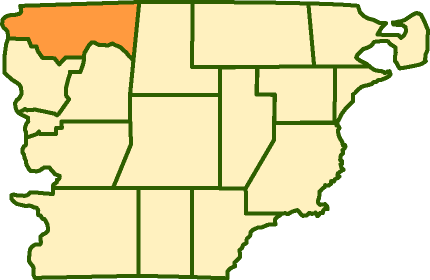
- location of Cushamen Department in Chubut Province
- Coordinates: 42°54′S 71°19′W
- Country: Argentina
- Province: Chubut
- Capital: Cushamen

Area
  - Total: 16,250 km^{2} (6,270 sq mi)

Population (2001)2001 census [INDEC]
  - Total: 17,134
  - Density: 1.054/km^{2} (2.731/sq mi)
  - Change 1991-2001: +23.4%
- Post code: U8211
- Area code: 02945
- Resident: cushamenense
- Website: http://www.esquel.gov.ar

Cushamen is a department located in the north west of Chubut Province in Argentina.

The provincial subdivision has a population of about 17,000 inhabitants in an area of 16,250 km^{2}, and its capital city is Cushamen. The name means loneliness in the Tehuelche language.

== Settlements ==
- Buenos Aires Chico
- Cholila
- Cushamen
- Hoyo de Epuyén
- El Maitén
- Epuyén
- Gualjaina
- Lago Epuyén
- Lago Puelo
- Las Golondrinas, Argentina
- Leleque
- Lago Rivadavia
- Fitamiche
- El Portezuelo
- El Molle
- Río Chico
- El Mallín
