= 2012 Araucanía wildfires =

Wildfires in Chile

A series of forest fires occurred in January 2012 mainly in the communes of Carahue and Lumaco. The first fire in Araucanía Region appeared in the estate Casa Piedra in Carahue and preceded other summer wildfires in Chile in the Biobío Region and Torres del Paine National Park. By 6 January 2012, seven firefighters had died in the Araucanía fires.

The highest political authority of Araucanía, the intendant of the region, denounced the fires as intentional on 6 January 2012.
