= The Rainbow Trail =

Western novel by Zane Grey, 1915

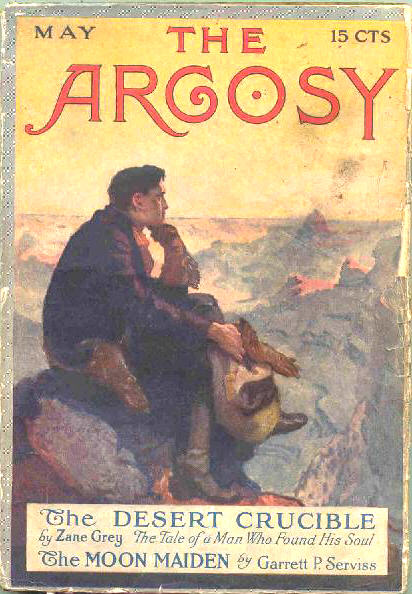
The Desert Crucible appeared in The Argosy in 1915.

The Rainbow Trail, also known as The Desert Crucible, is Western author Zane Grey's sequel to Riders of the Purple Sage. Originally published under the title The Rainbow Trail in 1915, it was re-edited and re-released in recent years as The Desert Crucible with the original manuscript that Grey submitted to publishers.

The novel takes place twelve years after events of Riders of the Purple Sage, in or about 1883. The wall to Surprise Valley has been breached, and Jane Withersteen is forced to choose between Lassiter's life and Fay Larkin's marriage to a Mormon.

Both novels are notable for their protagonists' mild opposition to Mormon polygamy, but in The Rainbow Trail this theme is treated more explicitly. The plots of both books revolve around the victimization of women in the Mormon culture: events in Riders of the Purple Sage are centered on the struggle of a Mormon woman who sacrifices her wealth and social status to avoid becoming a junior wife of the head of a local church, while The Rainbow Trail contrasts the older Mormons with the rising generation of Mormon women who will not tolerate polygamy and Mormon men who do not seek it.

The novel is the basis of several movies of the same name. Frank McGrath, later of Wagon Train, made his acting debut in the 1932 version, though his role is uncredited.

== Plot ==
John Shefford arrives in Red Lake, Arizona Territory, in April, having come from the East. In the post of the trader Presbrey, he finds a missionary (Willetts) struggling with a Navajo girl. He strikes the man, who flees, before finding Presbrey outside. Presbrey welcomes him and outfits him with gear and advice, and offers him a job, but he declines, preferring to travel to Kayenta, a trading post farther north. On his way to Kayenta, Shefford meets a man (Shadd) who intends to rob and kill him, but flees at the approach of another, who proves to be a Navajo, Nas Ta Bega, accompanied by the girl from Red Lake, who he describes as his sister, Glen Naspa. The two take Shefford to Kayenta, where he meets the trader Withers. That night, he tells Withers that he was a clergyman in Illinois, and had become good friends with a man named Venters, who had been a cowboy for a wealthy Utah Mormon woman, Jane Withersteen, who adopted a child, Fay Larkin, but fled the Mormon establishment with another cowboy, Lassiter. The three had entered a hidden canyon—Surprise Valley—and sealed the entrance with a landslide; Shefford is searching for the girl, Fay. Withers tells Shefford of a secret Mormon village, of "sealed wives"—the additional wives of Mormon polygamists—in a valley near the Utah border to which he takes periodic pack trains of supplies. He notes he once heard the name Fay Larkin in the nearby village of Stonebridge, Utah, and gives Shefford the job of taking his pack train.

When Withers' employee, a young Mormon named Joe Lake, arrives, Withers, Nas Ta Bega, Lake, and Shefford take a pack train to the hidden village, which proves to have three men and many women and children; the other husbands only visit occasionally, in secret. Shefford remains in the village for some days and is well-received, getting to know the inhabitants. One woman keeps to herself, and most of the others have little to do with her, calling her the Sago Lily. Shefford is intrigued, but does not get to see her face. She calls herself only Mary, and Lake is taken with her. When Withers and Lake press on to Stonebridge, Shefford remains, and seeks out Mary in the evenings, speaking with her on her porch. He tells her he was ejected from his church for dogmatic reasons and tells her of his quest to find Fay Larkin. She tells him Fay Larkin is dead. When Withers and Lake return, they have heard that Shadd may be lurking outside the valley, so Withers leaves the others and returns to Kayenta alone by another route. In a few days, Nas Ta Bega takes Shefford to his own home to collect skins and wool for export. Glen Naspa is there, and when Nas Ta Bega is out, Willetts arrives to take her away, but Shefford prevents it and drives Willetts off a second time.

Shefford rides with many pack trains and has numerous adventures over the course of the summer. The experience toughens him and he becomes fast friends with Lake. In October, word comes to Kayenta that federal prosecutors and a judge have come to Stonebridge to prosecute polygamists. They have arrested the women of the hidden village. Withers, Lake, and Shefford travel to Stonebridge, as do many others, including Shadd, the Mormon Bishop Kane, and one Waggoner, whom Withers describes as the most prosperous Mormon in southern Utah, said to have at least five wives and 55 children. The judge questions a number of the arrested women, including Mary, but learns little and they are released. Outside, Shefford sees Nas Ta Bega, who tells him that Glen Naspa has run off with Willetts, and that Mary is Fay Larkin. Shefford also learns that Willetts has been maligning him; when he finds Willetts, he beats him. That night, Shefford joins Lake and others in escorting the women back to the hidden village. After they arrive, Mary tells Shefford her story: she was indeed Fay Larkin, and lived in Surprise Valley until Mormon avengers scaled the walls and threatened to kill Lassiter unless Fay became a Mormon and married a Mormon. She assented, and was carried away to the hidden village, where she is visited some nights by her husband, whose face she has not seen.

Shefford and Fay devise a plan to escape the hidden village, rescue her foster parents, and leave the region. In the spring, word comes that Glen Naspa has returned to her grandfather. Nas Ta Bega and Shefford hurry to the site and find that Glen Naspa is dead, having died in childbirth. Back in the hidden village, Shefford seeks out Fay, but flees when they hear horse hooves approaching. In camp the next morning, Lake accuses Shefford of killing Fay's husband, but the village has arrested her. The two go to see the body, on Fay's porch, and Shefford recognizes Waggoner, with a familiar knife in him. The law has been sent for, so the two recruit Fay's friend Ruth and smuggle Fay out of captivity and out of the village. Joined by Nas Ta Bega, Shefford and Fay travel to Surprise Valley and rescue Lassiter and Jane Withersteen while Lake heads for a ferry to procure a boat. The escaping group are pursued by Shadd's gang, but Shefford ambushes them. The fugitives travel down the canyon of the Rainbow Bridge to the Colorado River. Late the next day, Lake comes down the river in a boat. The group shoot the rapids of the river, passing through the Grand Canyon. Two days' travel from the river, they arrive in Willow Springs, principal seat of the trader Presbrey. They prepare for a journey to Flagstaff; Nas Ta Bega and Lake bid Shefford quiet farewells.

In the epilogue, Shefford, Fay, Jane, and Lassiter visit the Venters' farm in Illinois. There, they are re-united with two of Jane's horses from years earlier. The new arrivals think of what they have left, and Shefford of all he has seen in the West.

== Characters ==
=== Principal characters ===
- John Shefford - the protagonist, a defrocked clergyman from Beaumont, Illinois; inspired by the tales of his friend, he journeys to Arizona to find a mystery and himself
- Mary/Fay Larkin - a young woman, raised in isolation, coerced into being a Mormon plural wife and called the Sago Lily by others
- Joe Lake - a young Mormon in the employ of Withers; he disapproves of polygamy and those who practice it, and is interested in Mary
- Nas Ta Bega - a Navajo who was raised by missionaries, but rejected their life and returned to his people; he sometimes works for Withers, and befriends Shefford, whom he repeatedly saves and helps

=== Supporting characters ===
- Withers - a trader based in Kayenta; he hires Shefford and trains him in the ways of the West
- Glen Naspa - the sister of Nas Ta Bega; she runs off with Willetts
- Jim Lassiter - protector of Fay Larkin and Jane Withersteen; he lives in the valley he sealed off to escape Mormon persecution twelve years earlier
- Jane Withersteen - adoptive mother of Fay Larkin; she lives in the sealed valley
- Shadd - a Paiute or "half-breed" outlaw who is (at least) tolerated by the Mormons
- Willetts - a missionary who has additional interest in Glen Naspa
- Presbrey - a trader in Willow Creek and Red Lake

== Geography ==
Set in the borderlands of Utah and Arizona near Monument Valley, the novel includes many real locations, including Red Lake, Tuba, Kayenta, Moencopie, Moen Ave, and Willow Springs, Arizona; Bluff and Monticello, Utah, and Durango, Colorado. Natural features mentioned include the Elephant's Feet, Navajo Mountain, the San Juan Canyon, Escalante Canyon, Keams Canyon, Rainbow Bridge, and the Echo Cliffs.

The text also mentions the Grand Canyon, but it appears to be misplaced, as the fugitives leave the river before it would enter the canyon. The "Grand canyon of the Colorado" appears to be Glen Canyon.

== Reception ==
The sequel to the popular Riders of the Purple Sage was well-received. The New York Times called it "Poignant in its emotional qualities." Publishers Weekly said “[A] masterpiece of its kind . . . replete, rounded, rich in every feature which pertains to the genre in question . . . [Grey] reaches out to the full length of his stride.” The New York Herald opined that “[Grey] knows the West.”
