= List of places in Arizona (M) =

This is a list of cities, towns, unincorporated communities, counties, and other places in the U.S. state of Arizona, which start with the letter M. This list is derived from the Geographic Names Information System, which has numerous errors, so it also includes many ghost towns and historical places that are not necessarily communities or actual populated places. This list also includes information on the number and names of counties in which the place lies, its lower and upper ZIP code bounds, if applicable, its U.S. Geological Survey (USGS) reference number(s) (called the GNIS), class as designated by the USGS, and incorporated community located in (if applicable).

== M ==
Name of place	Number of counties	Principal county	GNIS #(s)	Class	Located in	ZIP code	
Name of place	Number of counties	Principal county	GNIS #(s)	Class	Located in	Lower	Upper
Madera Canyon	1	Santa Cruz	36713	Populated Place		85706	
Magma	1	Pinal	24503	Populated Place			
Maish Vaya	1	Pima	2582821	CDP			
Makgum Havoka	1	Pima	24504	Populated Place			
Mammoth	1	Pinal	2412935	Civil (Town)		85618	
Manila	1	Navajo	24506	Populated Place			
Many Farms	1	Apache	2408169	CDP		86538	
Marana	1	Pima	2412951	Civil (Town)		85653	
Marble Canyon	1	Coconino	25252	Populated Place		86036	
Maricopa	1	Pinal	2411032	Civil (City)		85239	
Maricopa Indian Reservation	1	Pinal	23997	Civil (Indian reservation)		85247	
Maricopa Colony	1	Maricopa	2612141	CDP		85339	
Maricopa Village	1	Maricopa	7702	Populated Place		85339	
Maricopa Wells	1	Pinal	42802	Populated Place			
Marine Corps Air Station Yuma	1	Yuma	2512279	Military			
Martinez Lake	1	Yuma	2582822	CDP		85365	
Maryvale	1	Maricopa	7761	Populated Place	Phoenix	85031	
Maverick	1	Apache	24510	Populated Place		85901	
Mayer	1	Yavapai	2408191	CDP		86333	
McConnico	1	Mohave	2582819	CDP			
McGuireville	1	Yavapai	31670	Populated Place	Lake Montezuma	86335	
McMillianville	1	Gila	31681	Populated Place			
McNary	2	Apache	2408802	CDP		85930	
McNeal	1	Cochise	2582820	CDP		85617	
Mead Ranch	1	Gila	2582823	CDP			
Meadview	1	Mohave	2582824	CDP		86444	
Mesa	1	Maricopa	2411087	Civil (City)		85201	77
Mesa del Caballo	1	Gila	2582825	CDP			
Mescal	1	Cochise	2582826	CDP			
Mesquite Creek	1	Mohave	2408824	CDP			
Meteor City	1	Coconino	24515	Populated Place			
Mexican Town	1	Pima	7966	Populated Place	Ajo	85321	
Mexican Water	1	Apache	24516	Populated Place		86514	
Mexican Water Trading Post	1	Apache	43097	Populated Place			
Miami	1	Gila	2412991	Civil (Town)		85539	
Midland City	1	Gila	31842	Populated Place		85539	
Minnehaha	1	Yavapai	31922	Populated Place			
Mint	1	Yavapai	38637	Populated Place			
Miracle Valley	1	Cochise	2582827	CDP		85615	
Moccasin	1	Mohave	2582828	CDP		86022	
Moenave	1	Coconino	8157	Populated Place		86045	
Moenkopi	1	Coconino	2408850	CDP		86045	
Mohave Valley	1	Mohave	2408851	CDP		86440	
Mohawk	1	Yuma	24519	Populated Place			
Moivayi	1	Maricopa	24520	Populated Place			
Mojave City	1	Mohave	25308	Populated Place			
Mojave Ranch Estates	1	Mohave	2408854	CDP			
Morenci	1	Greenlee	2408868	CDP		85540	
Mormon Lake	1	Coconino	32047	Populated Place		86038	
Morristown	1	Maricopa	2582829	CDP		85342	
Mountainaire	1	Coconino	2408886	CDP		86001	
Mount Trumbull	1	Mohave	12738	Populated Place			
Munds Park	1	Coconino	2408889	CDP		86017	
