= Mirador =

Mirador may refer to:

== Places ==
- Mirador, Maranhão, a municipality in Maranhão, Brazil
- Mirador, Paraná, a municipality in Paraná, Brazil
- Mirador, Arizona, a place in Arizona, US
- Mirador, California, a place in California, US
- Mirador (Greenwood, Virginia), a historic home
- El Mirador, a large pre-Columbian settlement in Guatemalań
- Mirador Basin, a geological depression in the northern department of Petén, Guatemala
- El Mirador cave (Cueva del Mirador), a cave in the Atapuerca Mountains, Spain
- Mount Mirador, a mountain in the Philippines
- Mount Tlaloc (Cerro Tláloc or El Mirador), a mountain in central Mexico
- Quinta El Mirador, a village in Argentina
- Mirador (Maya site), pre-Columbian archaeological site

== Music ==
- Mirador (Magnum album)
- Mirador (Tarnation album)
- Mirador (band)
- "Mirador" (song), a 1989 song by Johnny Hallyday

== Literature ==
- Mirador (magazine), a literature, art and politics weekly that was published in Barcelona between 1929 and 1938, see El Be Negre
- The Mirador (novel) a novel by Sarah Monette
- The Mirador, the newspaper of Miramonte High School, Orinda, California

== Other uses ==
- El Mirador Airport, an airport in Chile
- Mirador mine, a large copper mine in Ecuador
- Mirador Volleyball, a Dominican Republic volleyball club
- Parque El Mirador, a football stadium in Puebla, Mexico
- Mirador, an image viewer optimized to display IIIF resources
- Mirador, a video game by Sauropod Studio, the developers of Castle Story
- Mirador (architecture), a type of room in Moorish and Spanish architecture
