= Manila (disambiguation) =

Manila is the capital of the Philippines.

Manila, Maynila, and Maynilad may also refer to:

== Places ==
=== Philippines ===
- Metro Manila, the metropolitan area centered on Manila and the National Capital Region of the Philippines
- Mega Manila, a megalopolis which includes Metro Manila and neighboring provinces
- Manila (province), a defunct province that existed during the Spanish colonial period
- Legislative districts of Manila, electoral divisions in Manila used to assign seats in various legislatures
- Greater Manila Area, a contiguous urbanization surrounding Metro Manila
- City of Greater Manila, a defunct chartered city during World War II
- Rajahnate of Maynila, a polity located at Manila in the 16th century

=== United States ===
- Manila, Alabama
- Manila, Arizona
- Manila, Arkansas
- Manila, California
- Manila, Kentucky
- Manila, Missouri
- Manila, Utah
- Manila, West Virginia

== Media ==
=== Film ===
- Manila (2009 film), a 2009 film
- The Claws of Light, a 1975 film also known as Manila
- Metro Manila (film), a 2013 film

=== Television ===
- Maynila (TV series), Filipino television series on GMA Network

=== Music ===
- Manila (album), by Paul Kelly
- "Manila" (Hotdogs song)
- Manila Sound, a genre of music
- "Manila" a 2021 song by Ray Dalton and Álvaro Soler

=== Games ===
- Manila (board game)
- A variant of community card poker

== Other ==
- Gabriel Janer Manila (born 1940), Spanish writer
- Manila Broadcasting Company, now known as MBC Media Group, Philippine media company
- Manila Bulletin, a newspaper company in the Philippines
- Manila Cathedral, a Roman Catholic church in Manila, Philippines
- Manila Luzon, a drag performer best known for being a contestant on RuPaul's Drag Race
- Manila Esposito (born 2006), Italian artistic gymnast
- Manila (horse), an American Thoroughbred racehorse
- Manila hemp refers to the natural fibre from the abacá plant that is used in making:
  - Manila ropes
  - Manila paper
  - Manila folders and envelopes
- Manila, a Sempron processor core
- Manila shawl, a fashion accessory
- Maynilad Water Services

== See also ==
- Manilla (disambiguation)
