= Clah =

Clah is a surname. Notable people with the surname include:

- Arthur Wellington Clah (1831–1916), chief of the Tsimshian people
- Heather Clah (fl. 2005), American and Navajo lawyer
