= TCBS =

TCBS may refer to:

- Hard Knocks: The Chris Benoit Story
- Thiosulfate-citrate-bile salts-sucrose agar, a selective media agar type used in microbiology for cholerae culture
- The "Tea Club and Barrovian Society" of which J. R. R. Tolkien was a member
- Tuba City Boarding School
- Texas Community Bancshares Inc. A Nasdaq Listed Company
