= KGHR =

Public radio station in Tuba City, Arizona

KGHR Native Public Radio
Currently silent
- Tuba City, Arizona; United States
- Broadcast area: The Navajo Nation, Northern Arizona, Monument Valley, and Grand Canyon
- Frequency: 91.3 (MHz)

Programming
- Format: Native American Community Radio / Public radio
- Affiliations: Koahnic Broadcast Corporation, Public Radio International

Ownership
- Owner: Greyhills Academy High School; (Tuba City High School Board, Inc.)

History
- Call sign meaning: Grey Hills Radio

Technical information
- Licensing authority: FCC
- Class: C0
- ERP: 100,000 Watts
- HAAT: 322 meters (601 feet)
- Transmitter coordinates: 36°21′27″N 111°12′12″W

Links
- Public license information: Native Public Radio Public file; LMS
- Website: https://www.greyhillsacademy.org/page/kghr-913-fm

KGHR (91.3 FM), is a Non-Commercial Radio station in Tuba City, Arizona. It primarily features Native American information and entertainment including locally produced programming for the Native American tribal residents and surrounding communities in Northern Arizona, Monument Valley, and Grand Canyon area. Other network programming is provided by Koahnic Broadcast Corporation's National Native News, Native Voice One, Mainstream, Indigefy and more.

== History ==
KGHR was assigned its callsign on December 7, 1989. The station initially broadcast on 91.5 MHz and took years to come to air, requiring various construction permit extensions and replacements. It was not until February 1993 that KGHR applied for a license to cover. In 2003, the station filed to move to 91.3; it doubled its power in 2006.

== See also ==
- List of community radio stations in the United States
