= Aaron Yazzie =

American mechanical engineer

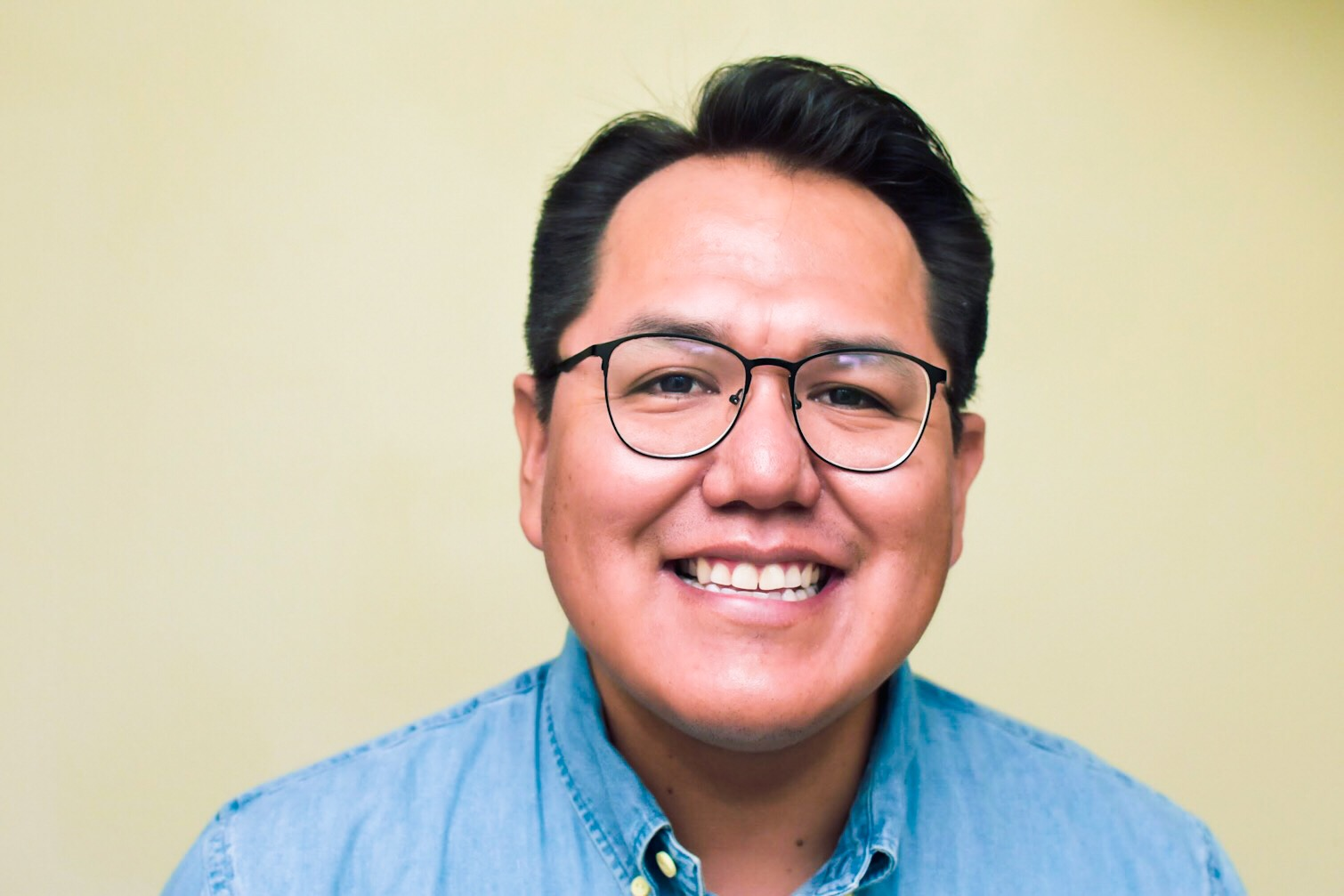
- Aaron Yazzie in 2019
- Born: 1986 (age 39–40); Tuba City, Arizona
- Education: Stanford University
- Engineering career
- Discipline: Mechanical engineering
- Employer: Jet Propulsion Laboratory
- Projects: Mars Science Laboratory; InSight; Mars 2020
- Website: https://www.aaronyazzie.com

Aaron Yazzie (born 1986) is a Diné (Navajo) mechanical engineer at NASA's Jet Propulsion Laboratory. His work involves planetary sample acquisition and handling. He has worked on the Mars Science Laboratory, InSight, and Mars 2020 missions.

== Early life and education ==
Yazzie is Ashįįhí (Salt Clan) and born for Todích'íi'nii (Bitter Water Clan). He was born in 1986 in Tuba City, Arizona, part of the Navajo Nation, and raised in Holbrook, Arizona, where his father was a civil engineer and his mother was a math teacher.

Yazzie had originally planned on attending a public university in Arizona, but he decided to apply to Stanford University after meeting an admissions counselor at a pre-college summer program for Native Americans. While at Stanford, he interned at two NASA research centers: the Goddard Space Flight Center and the Glenn Research Center. He graduated from Stanford in 2008 with a bachelor's degree in mechanical engineering.

== Jet Propulsion Laboratory career ==
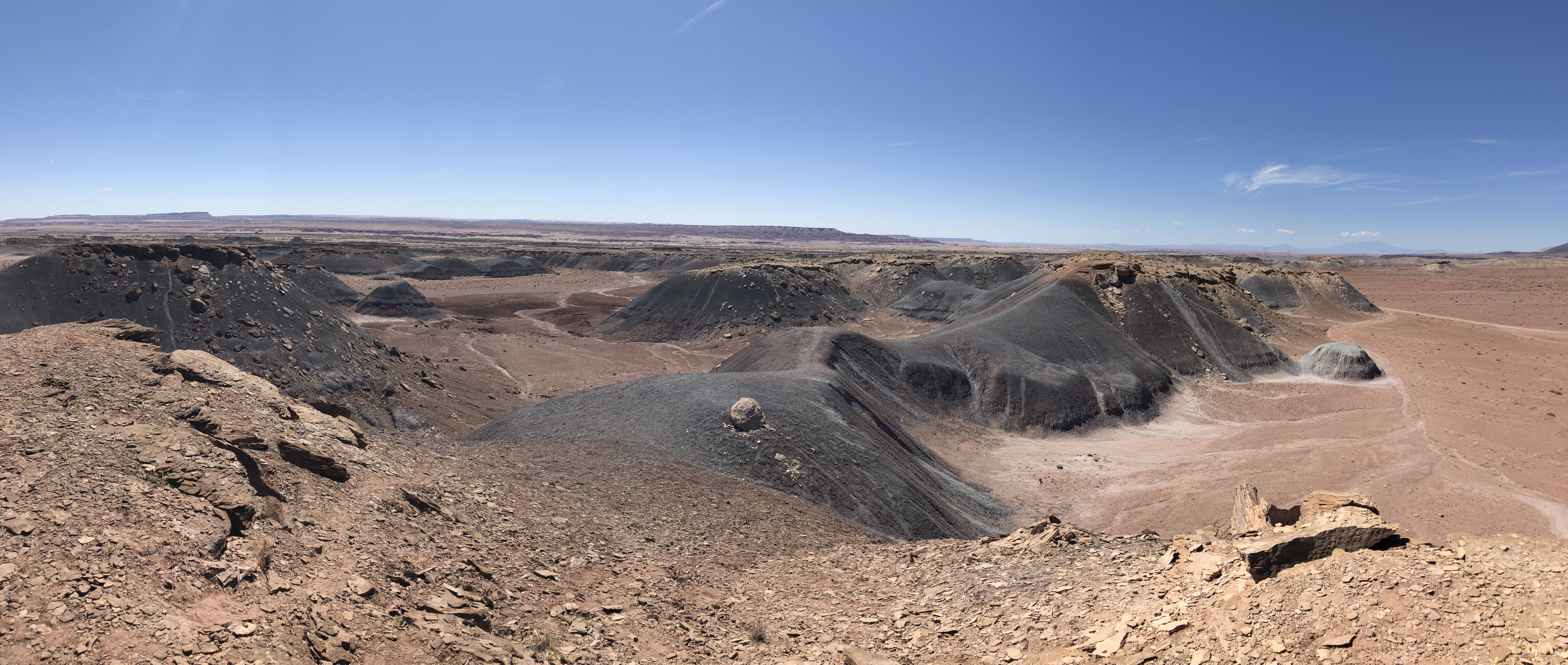
Photograph of the Painted Desert landscape on the Navajo Nation

Yazzie joined the Jet Propulsion Laboratory (JPL) in 2008. At JPL, he is a mechanical engineer working on planetary sample acquisition and handling. He has worked on the Mars Science Laboratory, InSight, and Mars 2020 missions.

Since joining JPL, Yazzie has been involved in recruiting other Native Americans to work at NASA.

Yazzie has said that the surface of Mars reminds him of the landscape near his Tuba City birthplace.

== Personal life ==
Yazzie's parents were both first generation college students and he credits them with encouraging him to get a college education. He is actively involved in outreach to Native students and attributes success in his career to the work ethic instilled in him by his Navajo upbringing.

Yazzie has had a long involvement with the American Indian Science and Engineering Society (AISES). He was an AISES college scholarship recipient, as well as the president of the Stanford chapter. Since graduating, he has become an AISES Sequoyah Fellow (lifetime member). Yazzie was featured in the book Notable Native People by Adrienne Keene.

He currently lives in Pasadena, California.
