= Manilla =

Manilla may refer to:

- Manilla (money), the 'bracelet' currency of West Africa
- Manilla, New South Wales, Australia
- Manilla River, a stream in New South Wales
- Manilla, Indiana, United States
- Manilla, Iowa, United States
- Manilla, Ontario, Canada
- Manilla, former name and now a common erroneous spelling of Manila, capital of the Philippines
- Manila paper

== See also ==
- Manila
- Manila (disambiguation)
