= Tuba City Unified School District =

School district in Coconino County, Arizona

Location
- Tuba City, Arizona, 86045; United States

District information
- Type: Public
- Grades: PreK–12
- NCES District ID: 0408680

Students and staff
- Students: 1,389
- Teachers: 101.99
- Staff: 144.0
- Student–teacher ratio: 13.62

Other information
- Website: www.tcusd.org

The Tuba City Unified School District is the school district headquartered in Tuba City, Arizona. It operates a Tuba City High School, Nizhoni Accelerated Academy, Tuba City Junior High School, Tuba City Elementary, and the Dzil Libei Elementary School, Tsinaabaas Habitiin Elementary School

In addition to Tuba City it serves Cameron, Moenkopi, Tonalea, and a section of Kaibeto.
