= Ethel Branch =

Native American lawyer

Ethel Billie Branch
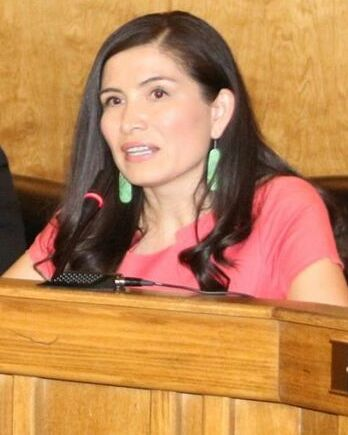
- Confirmation of Ethel Branch as Navajo Nation Attorney General in 2015

11th Attorney General of the Navajo Nation
- In office 2015–2019
- Preceded by: D. Harrison Tsosie
- Succeeded by: Doreen McPaul

13th Attorney General of the Navajo Nation
- In office 2023–2024
- Preceded by: Doreen McPaul
- Succeeded by: Heather L. Clah

Personal details
- Born: Tuba City, Arizona
- Education: Harvard University (BA, JD, MPP)
- Occupation: Lawyer, politician

Ethel Branch is an American attorney and politician. A member of the Navajo Nation, Branch was the 11th and 13th Attorney General of the Navajo Nation.

== Early life and education ==
Branch was born in Tuba City, Arizona and was raised on her family's ranch in the nearby town of Leupp where they raised pigs, sheep, horses, and cattle. In high school, she was president of the 4-H club.

Branch earned her bachelor's degree cum laude in history from Harvard College in 2001. She earned her JD from Harvard Law School in 2008, and later earned her Master of Public Policy from the Harvard Kennedy School of Government. While in graduate school, Branch was a Zuckerman Fellow, and served as a senior editor for the journal Harvard Environmental Law Review.

While studying at Harvard Kennedy, Branch recognized that there were few classes directly relevant to tribal law, and focused on the topic through her research projects. According to Branch: "[T]he way to ensure that there are more attorneys on the Nation and more help available to all aspects of our local governments is to have more law-trained Navajos."

== Career ==
After graduating from Harvard College, Branch returned to the Navajo Nation to teach, with the stated goal of trying to “open up doors of access for Navajo children.”

After law school, Branch sought law experiences outside of the Navajo Nation. She worked for the legal firm Orrick, Herrington & Sutcliffe in Seattle, Washington, focusing on tribal finance law. She also worked as an associate at Kanji & Katzen, a firm that focuses solely on native advocacy.

In 2015, Navajo Nation President Russell Begaye appointed Branch as the 11th Attorney General of the Navajo Nation. She served in this capacity from 2015 through 2019. As Attorney General, Branch oversaw the legal work involved with the 2015 Gold King Mine waste water spill, as well then-President Trump's attempt to revoke and replace the Bears Ears National Monument.

Following her tenure as Attorney General, Branch returned to the law firm Kanji & Katzen in April 2019. In response to the COVID-19 pandemic, Branch resigned from the law firm to focus on community response efforts to the virus. She started an organization called Navajo Hopi Solidarity which provides assistance to the elderly, single parents, and struggling families. By September 2020, she had raised over $5 million and assisted more than 5,000 families.

In 2023, Branch was re-appointed Attorney General for the Navajo Nation by President Buu Nygren.

On December 16, 2024, Branch was removed from office by the Navajo Nation Council. In accordance with tribal law, Navajo Nation Deputy Attorney General Heather L. Clah will serve as interim attorney general until a permanent replacement is approved by the council.

== Political career ==
In April 2022, Branch announced her candidacy for president of the Navajo Nation, with the aim of becoming the first woman to become Navajo Nation president. She was eliminated in the primary.

== Awards and honors ==
In 2018, Branch was awarded a 4-H Luminary Award. The Luminary Award honors influential 4-H alumni from across the nation.

In 2021, Branch was named Woman of the Year by the Phoenix Indian Center for her work on providing COVID-19 relief.

== See also ==
- List of Native American politicians
- Native American women in politics
