= Greyhills Academy High School =

High school in Tuba City, Arizona

Location
- 160 Warrior Dr; Tuba City, Arizona 86045; United States
- 36°07′31″N 111°13′24″W

Information
- School type: BIE charter high school
- Established: 1972 (54 years ago)
- CEEB code: 030451
- Principal: Vaughn Salabye
- Teaching staff: 15.00 (FTE)
- Grades: 9–12
- Enrollment: 149 (2023–2024)
- Student to teacher ratio: 9.93
- Colors: Black, silver and teal
- Mascot: (Fightin') Knight
- Team name: Knights
- Website: www.greyhillsacademy.org

Greyhills Academy High School is a Native American boarding high school (grades 9–12) in Tuba City, Arizona on the Navajo Nation. It is operated by the Western Navajo Agency, a tribal agency working in affiliation with the Bureau of Indian Education (BIE), which funds the school.

A radio station, KGHR 91.3 FM, is associated with the school.

The school has a dormitory and has boarding students.
