= Moivayi, Arizona =

- Populated place
- Location within Arizona Location within the United States
- Coordinates: 32°33′48″N 112°27′32″W
- Country: United States
- State: Arizona
- County: Maricopa
- Elevation: 2,356 ft (718 m)
- Time zone: UTC-7 (Mountain (MST))
  - Summer (DST): UTC-7 (MST)
- Area code: 520
- FIPS code: 04-47480
- GNIS feature ID: 24520

Moivayi is a populated place situated in Maricopa County, Arizona, United States. It has an estimated elevation of 2,356 feet (718 m) above sea level.
