= Moenkopi, Arizona =

Community in Coconino County, Arizona

- CDP
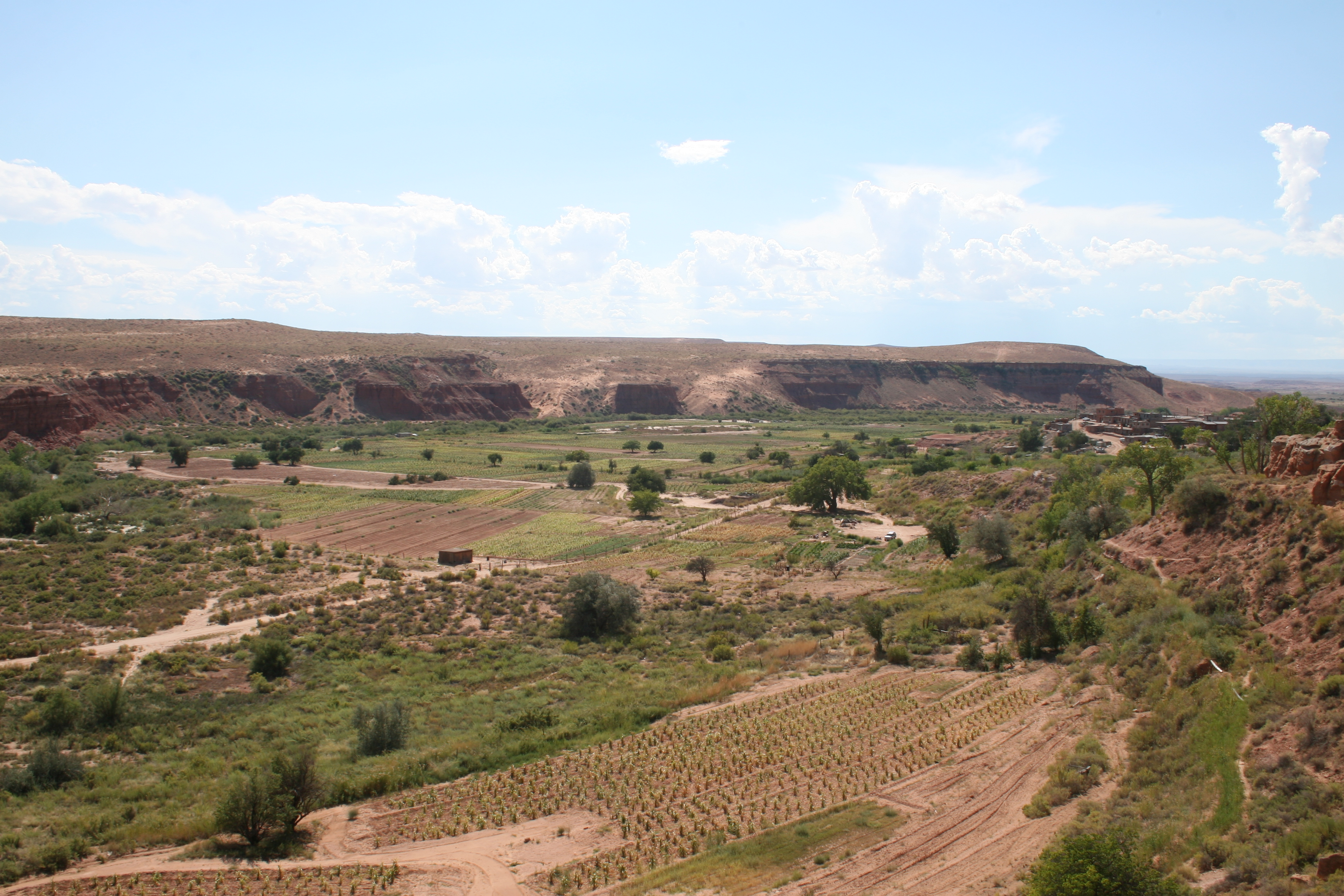
- Southeastern outskirts of Moenkopi and farming areas, as seen from the Arizona State Route 264

- Location in Coconino County and the state of Arizona

- Location in the United States Moenkopi (the United States)
- Coordinates: 36°06′45″N 111°13′16″W
- Country: United States
- State: Arizona
- County: Coconino

Area
  - Total: 1.50 sq mi (3.89 km^{2})
  - Land: 1.50 sq mi (3.89 km^{2})
  - Water: 0 sq mi (0.00 km^{2})
- Elevation: 4,784 ft (1,458 m)

Population (2020)
  - Total: 771
  - Density: 512.9/sq mi (198.04/km^{2})
- Time zone: UTC-7 (MST)
- ZIP code: 86045
- Area code: 928
- FIPS code: 04-47330
- GNIS feature ID: 2408850

Moenkopi (Hopi: Mùnqapi, Navajo: Oozéí Hayázhí) is a census-designated place (CDP) in Coconino County, Arizona, United States, adjacent to the southeast side of Tuba City off U.S. Route 160. The population was 964 at the 2010 census.

A Hopi community, it was founded in 1870 as a summer farming area by people from the Hopi Third Mesa village of Oraibi. It is 40 miles (64 km) west of Third Mesa and is divided into the villages of Upper Moenkopi and Lower Moenkopi. It lies in a 250.306 km^{2} (96.644 sq mi) exclave of the Hopi Reservation that is separated from the main part of the reservation located to the east. Both parts are surrounded by Navajo Nation territory. The smaller section comprises only 3.8 percent of the Hopi Reservation's land area and 13.2 percent (916 persons) of its population.

== Geography ==
According to the United States Census Bureau, the CDP has a total area of 1.6 square miles (4.1 km^{2}), all land.

== Demographics ==
Historical population
Census	Pop.	Note	%±
2020	771		—
U.S. Decennial Census

Languages (2000)	Percent
Spoke Hopi at home	56.4%
Spoke English at home	39.1%
Spoke Navajo at home	4.5%

As of the census of 2000, there were 901 people, 242 households, and 202 families residing in the CDP. The population density was 561.9 inhabitants per square mile (217.0/km^{2}). There were 284 housing units at an average density of 177.1 per square mile (68.4/km^{2}).

The racial makeup of the CDP was 96.7% Native American, 1.7% from two or more races, 1.4% White, 0.2% from other races, and Hispanic or Latino of any race were 0.8% of the population.

There were 242 households, out of which 36.8% had children under the age of 18 living with them, 46.7% were married couples living together, 28.9% had a female householder with no husband present, and 16.5% were non-families. 14.0% of all households were made up of individuals, and 5.8% had someone living alone who was 65 years of age or older. The average household size was 3.72 and the average family size was 4.06.

In the CDP, the age distribution of the population showed 35.2% under the age of 18, 9.4% from 18 to 24, 23.1% from 25 to 44, 20.0% from 45 to 64, and 12.3% who were 65 years of age or older. The median age was 31 years. For every 100 females, there were 96.7 males. For every 100 females age 18 and over, there were 89.0 males.

The median income for a household in the CDP was $38,710, and the median income for a family was $38,266. Males had a median income of $49,063 versus $28,409 for females. The per capita income for the CDP was $11,432. About 15.6% of families and 13.8% of the population were below the poverty line, including 15.8% of those under the age of 18 and 4.5% of those 65 and older.

== Education ==
Tuba City Unified School District is the local school district. Tuba City High School is the comprehensive high school.

There is a tribal school, Moencopi Day School, in Moenkopi that is affiliated with the Bureau of Indian Education (BIE).
