= Mirador, Paraná =

Coordinates: 23°15′28″S 52°46′33″W

- Municipality
- Flag Coat of arms
- Interactive map of Mirador, Paraná
- Country: Brazil
- Region: Southern
- State: Paraná
- Mesoregion: Noroeste Paranaense

Population (2020)
  - Total: 2,196
- Time zone: UTC−3 (BRT)

Mirador, Paraná is a municipality in the state of Paraná in the Southern Region of Brazil.

== See also ==
- List of municipalities in Paraná
