= Tonalea, Arizona =

CDP in Coconino County, Arizona

Tonalea, Arizona Tó Nehelį́į́h (Navajo)
- CDP
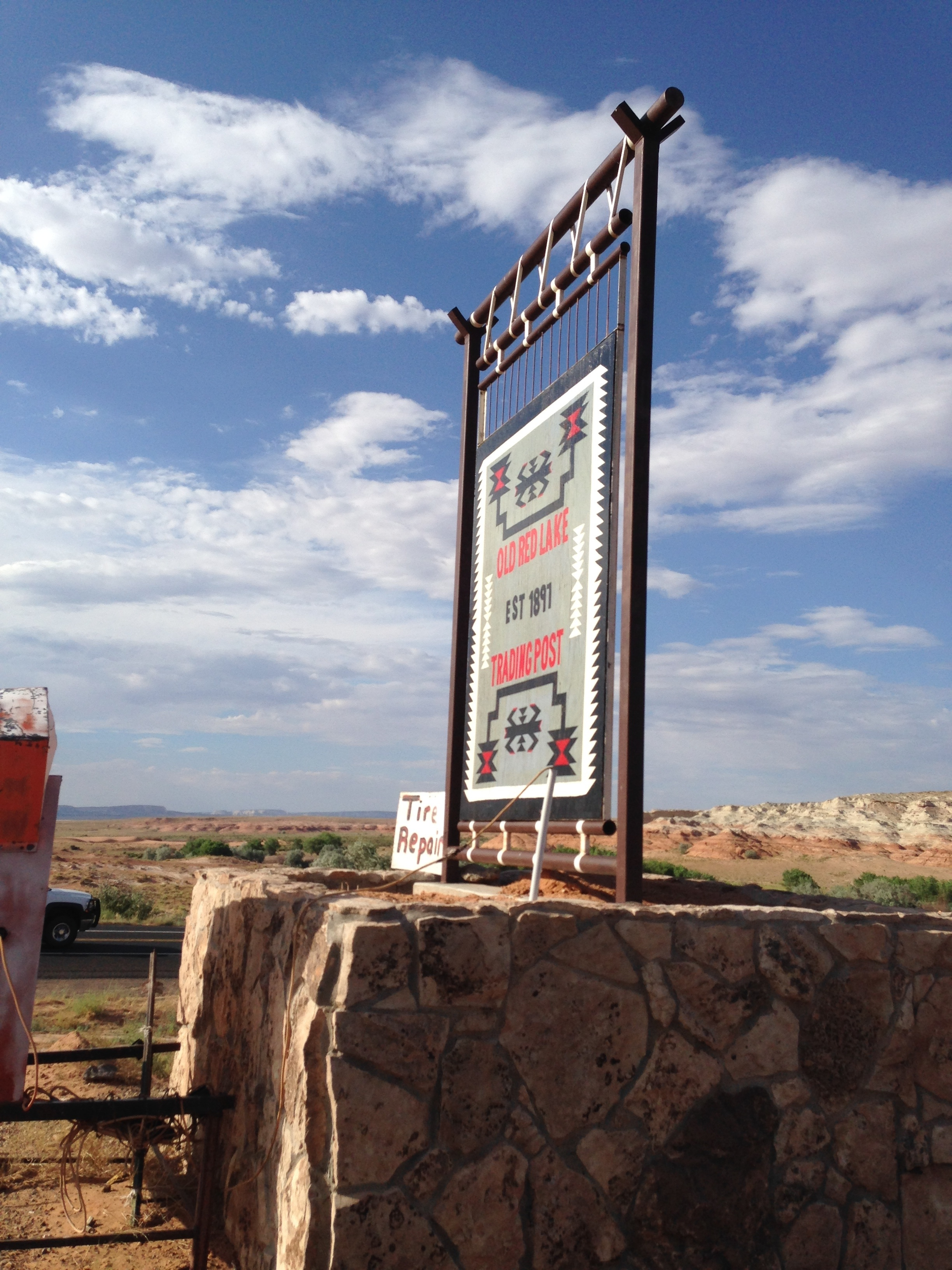
- Old Red Lake Trading Post, Tonalea, July 2014

- Location in Coconino County and the state of Arizona
- Coordinates: 36°19′18″N 110°58′00″W
- Country: United States
- State: Arizona
- County: Coconino

Area
  - Total: 9.93 sq mi (25.72 km^{2})
- Elevation: 5,660 ft (1,730 m)

Population (2020)
  - Total: 451
  - Density: 45.4/sq mi (17.54/km^{2})
- Time zone: UTC-7 (MST)
- ZIP codes: 86044, 86053
- Area code: 928
- FIPS code: 04-74470
- GNIS feature ID: 2409332

Tonalea (Navajo: Tó Nehelį́į́h) is a census-designated place (CDP) in Coconino County, Arizona, United States. The population was 549 at the 2010 census. It has also been known as Red Lake.

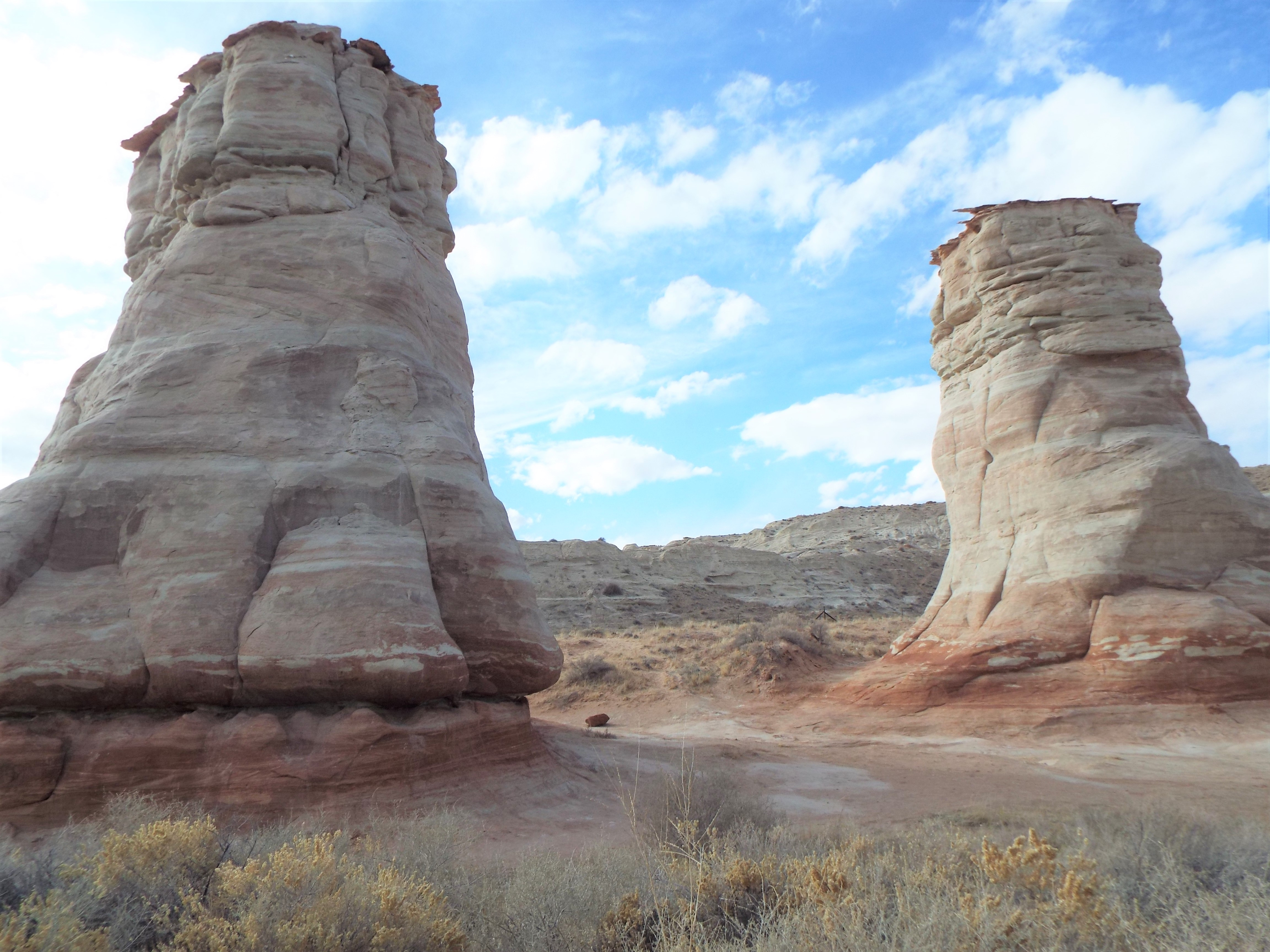
Two mounds known as "Elephant Feet", February 2020

== Geography ==
Tonalea is located along U.S. Route 160 (aka the Navajo Trail).

According to the United States Census Bureau, the CDP has a total area of 9.7 square miles (25 km^{2}), all land.

== Demographics ==
Historical population
Census	Pop.	Note	%±
2000	562		—
2010	549		−2.3%
2020	451		−17.9%
U.S. Decennial Census

As of the census of 2000, there were 562 people, 123 households, and 104 families living in the CDP. The population density was 58.2 inhabitants per square mile (22.5/km^{2}). There were 135 housing units at an average density of 14.0 per square mile (5.4/km^{2}). The racial makeup of the CDP was 99.1% Native American, 0.7% White, and 0.2% from other races. 0.9% of the population were Hispanic or Latino of any race.

There were 123 households, out of which 55.3% had children under the age of 18 living with them, 53.7% were married couples living together, 23.6% had a female householder with no husband present, and 15.4% were non-families. 14.6% of all households were made up of individuals, and 2.4% had someone living alone who was 65 years of age or older. The average household size was 4.57 and the average family size was 5.13.

In the CDP, the age distribution of the population shows 48.9% under the age of 18, 10.1% from 18 to 24, 24.6% from 25 to 44, 13.0% from 45 to 64, and 3.4% who were 65 years of age or older. The median age was 19 years. For every 100 females, there were 93.8 males. For every 100 females age 18 and over, there were 93.9 males.

The median income for a household in the CDP was $32,059, and the median income for a family was $32,206. Males had a median income of $36,333 versus $15,750 for females. The per capita income for the CDP was $8,171. About 10.8% of families and 13.6% of the population were below the poverty line, including 16.9% of those under age 18 and none of those age 65 or over.

== Education ==
Tuba City Unified School District is the local school district. Tuba City High School is the comprehensive high school.

== See also ==
- List of census-designated places in Arizona
