= Makgum Havoka, Arizona =

- Populated place
- Location within the state of Arizona Makgum Havoka (the United States)
- Coordinates: 32°16′29″N 111°57′39″W
- Country: United States
- State: Arizona
- County: Pima
- Elevation: 2,920 ft (890 m)
- Time zone: UTC-7 (Mountain (MST))
  - Summer (DST): UTC-7 (MST)
- Area code: 520
- FIPS code: 04-33420
- GNIS feature ID: 24504

Makgum Havoka, also known as Makumivooka, is a populated place situated on the San Xavier Indian Reservation in Pima County, Arizona, United States. It has an estimated elevation of 1,863 feet (568 m) above sea level.

== Name ==
Makgum (also makumĭ, makkumi, makkum) is an O'odham word for the caterpillars of the White-lined Sphinx moth, which the O'odham boiled and ate. Havoka is a derived word for a pond. Vo'o refers to a natural pond or a puddle. The -g/-k suffix is a common element in O'odham place names, meaning "a place where there is...", and the nominalizing suffix -a is sometimes associated with possession. Ha- is the third person plural possessive prefix. The full name may be translated as "caterpillar's pond". In 1939 the Bureau of Indian Affairs petitioned the USGS to officially decide between Makumivooka and Makgum Havoka. On April 10, 1941, the Board on Geographic Names issued their decision, officially naming the village Makgum Havoka. (Note: Decision details may be found on the USGS link, where the "view decision card" is available.)
