= Heather Clah =

American and Navajo lawyer

Attorney General of the Navajo Nation
- In office December 2024 – August 2025
- Preceded by: Ethel Branch

Personal details
- Education: Arizona State University

Heather L. Clah is an American and Navajo lawyer who served as the attorney general of the Navajo Nation for less than a month in 2025. A longtime legal counsel within the Navajo Nation, she was appointed deputy attorney general in 2023 and became acting attorney general in December 2024.

During her time as acting attorney general, Clah oversaw controversial negotiations to allow uranium ore transport across the reservation. She was confirmed as the permanent attorney general on July 22, 2025, but was removed from office by the Navajo Nation Council on August 6 or 7 in an 11–1 vote. The council, which had sponsored her confirmation weeks earlier, offered no public explanation for her removal, a decision Navajo Nation president Buu Nygren called "disappointing."

== Education ==
Clah earned a J.D. from Arizona State University College of Law (ASU) in 2005. During her time at ASU, she served as a student attorney with the university's Indian Legal Clinic.

== Career ==
Clah served as a corporate attorney for the Navajo Tribal Utility Authority, legal counsel for former Navajo Nation president Ben Shelly, chief legal counsel for the Navajo Nation Office of the President and Vice President, a court staff attorney for the Judicial Branch, an attorney in the Department of Justice, and a law clerk for Farmington DNA Legal Services. As of 2025, Clah is a member of the New Mexico Bar Association and the Navajo Nation Bar Association.

In April 2023, Clah was confirmed as the Navajo Nation Deputy Attorney General. The legislation for her confirmation was sponsored by Navajo Nation Council delegate Rickie Nez.

Clah became the acting attorney general in December 2024, following the Navajo Nation Council's removal of attorney general Ethel Branch. In this capacity, she oversaw negotiations with Energy Fuels Inc. for an agreement to resume the transport of uranium ore across the reservation, which was announced in January 2025. In a statement, Clah praised the company for its "sincere approach" and "genuine understanding for the Navajo Nation's and the Navajo people's trauma regarding uranium." In a February 2025 social media video, she explained that because the tribe could not legally prevent the transport, her office focused on negotiating terms that would protect the Navajo people. Her handling of the negotiations drew criticism from some officials. Council delegate Amber Crotty stated she opposed Clah because the uranium transportation contract was signed "not with the full involvement of impacted communities."

On July 22, 2025, Clah was confirmed as the permanent attorney general in a measure again sponsored by Council delegate Rickie Nez. During her confirmation, Clah said, "My basic point was to make sure that the communication from the Department of Justice is there with this council."

Less than a month later, on August 6 or 7, 2025, the Navajo Nation Council held a special session and voted to remove Clah from her position. The emergency legislation calling for her removal was sponsored by delegate Nez, the same legislator who had backed her confirmation weeks earlier. The council deliberated in a private executive session and offered no public explanation for its decision. The vote to remove her passed 11–1. Council delegate Danny Simpson was the only member to vote against the removal.

Clah was the second attorney general to be removed by the council in less than a year. Following the vote, Navajo president Buu Nygren called the decision "disappointing" and accused the council of "removing two Navajo women from that position."

== See also ==
- List of Native American politicians
- Native American women in politics
