= Meteor City, Arizona =

- Locale
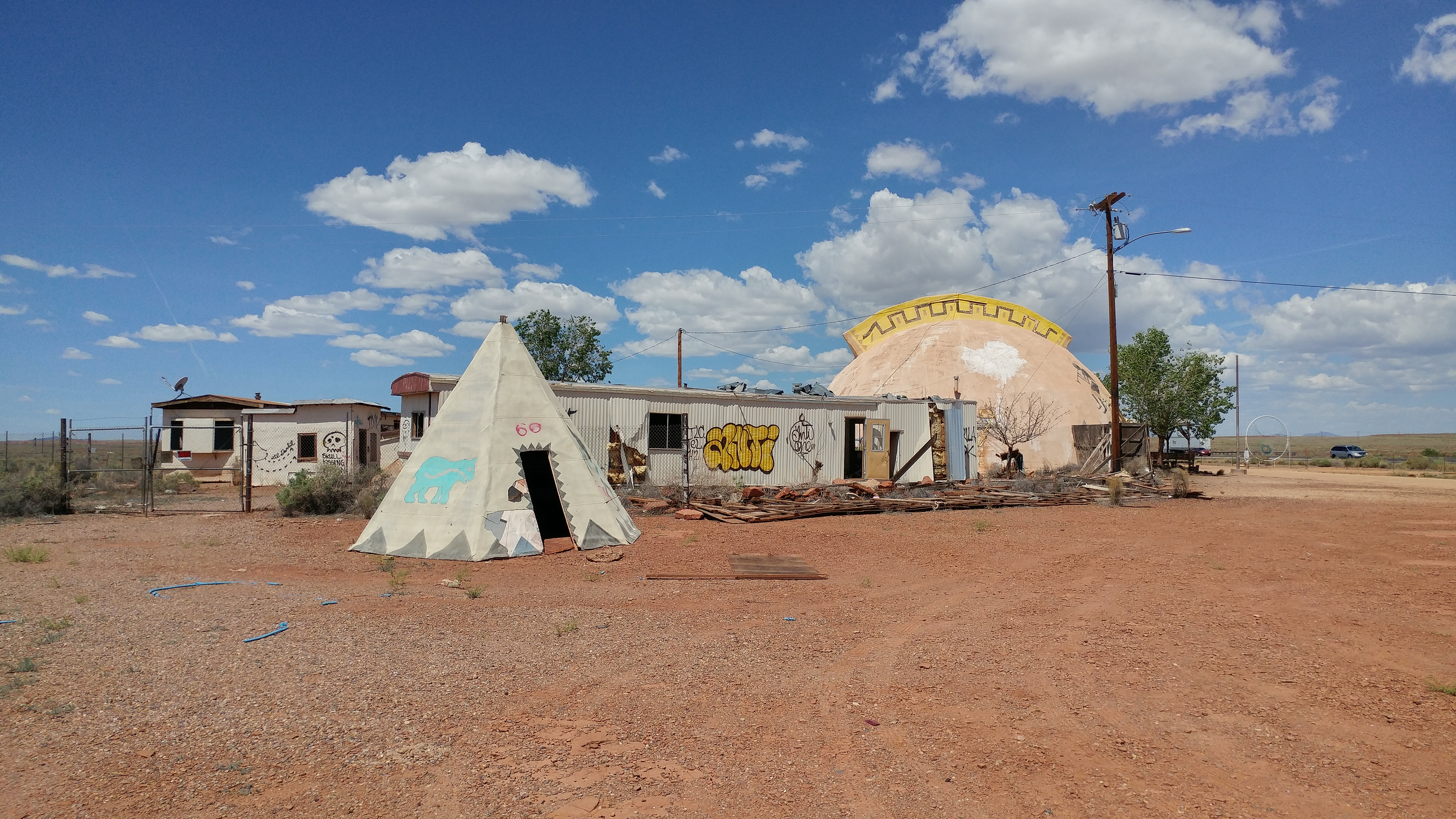
- Meteor City Trading Post, Historic Route 66, Meteor City, AZ

- Location within the state of Arizona Meteor City (the United States)
- Coordinates: 35°05′40″N 110°56′08″W
- Country: United States
- State: Arizona
- County: Coconino
- Elevation: 5,033 ft (1,534 m)
- Time zone: UTC-7 (Mountain (MST))
  - Summer (DST): UTC-7 (MST)
- Area code: 928
- FIPS code: 04-46105
- GNIS feature ID: 24515

Meteor City was a historic trading post located on historic Route 66, west of the Unincorporated town of Winslow, within Coconino County, Arizona. Accessing it from Interstate 40 (I-40), you would exit at Mile-marker / Exit 239 (Meteor City Road) coming from the east or west.

It has an estimated elevation of 5,033 feet (1,534 m) above sea level.

Despite its name, Meteor City was never the name of a town, rather, it was a trading post. The Meteor City Trading Post, named in honor of the nearby Meteor or Barringer Crater, is the first of three Route 66-inspired roadside attractions located only a few miles apart along a 30-mile stretch west on Interstate 40 from Winslow to Flagstaff: Meteor City; the ghost town of Two Guns and the ruins of the Twin Arrows Trading Post / Diner and Gas Station, which now marks the turnoff for the new Twin Arrows Navajo Casino Resort.

Meteor City was first opened in 1938 and was operated as the Sharber Service Station, under the Texaco brand, by Arizona resident Joe Sharber.

In 1941, an expansion of the property by a new owner, Iowan Jack Newsum, nicknamed “Lonesome Jack,” included the addition of a trading post where visitors could buy gas, groceries, and curios. At one time the sign upon entering the area once read, "Population: 1" and later "Population 2" when the service station's proprietor Joseph Sharber married Gloria. In 1979, a geodesic dome, complete with a bright yellow faux Mohawk, was built after the original building burnt down in the 1960s to house the curio shop which was stocked with a variety of items, including moccasins, postcards, and Baja shirts.

Mike and Joann Brown purchased Meteor City in March 2017, and they are currently working to restore the dome, and the surrounding buildings and property.

Two former 'quirky' tourist attractions on the Meteor City property were billed as the “World’s Longest Map of Route 66,” painted by American artist and cartographer Bob Waldmire, and the “World’s Largest Dream-catcher,” located out near the road in front of the dome. There are also five 'tee-pees' on the property.

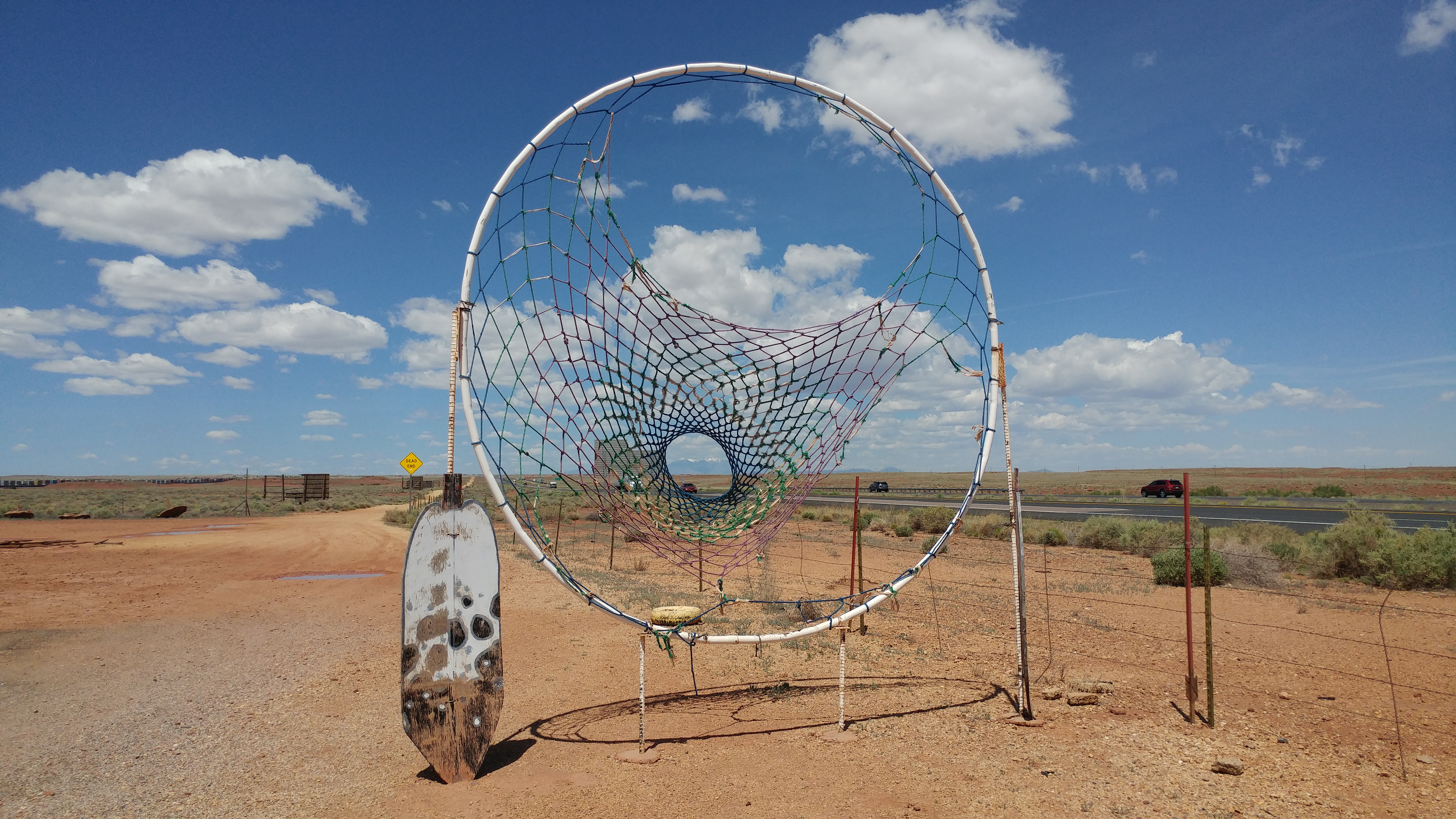
Dreamcatcher, Meteor City Trading Post, Historic US 66

The exterior wood fence where the map was displayed has fallen down and is currently in storage and the tattered dreamcatcher will be repaired.

The Browns also hope to restore the original Justice of the Peace building located just west of the dome. Infamous as “the wicked witch of Route 66,” Newsum's wife, Goldie, serving as justice, issued speeding citations to unwary drivers on Route 66.

The property changed hands yet again in 2024, and in 2025 reopened to the public with a "Dino Drive-Thru" attraction.

== See also ==
- Route 66
