= Tuba City Boarding School =

Bureau of Indian Education (BIE) operated school

Coordinates: 36.1334°N 111.2418°W

Image of Manuelito Hall

Tuba City Boarding School (TCBS) is a Bureau of Indian Education (BIE)-operated DK-8 boarding school in Tuba City, Arizona.

== History ==
The school was created before 1900. as the Blue Canyon Day School a.k.a. Western Navaho Training School at Blue Canyon in Blue Canyon, Arizona. In 1903 the school moved to Tuba City and there became the Western Navajo School. It received its current name circa the 1930s.

Like other Bureau of Indian Affairs (BIA) boarding schools of the early to mid-20th century, Tuba City Boarding had a military-esque regimen forcing assimilation. Its peak boarding enrollment was over 1,000. By the year 2000 the boarding population was down to 200. The school has a museum with memorabilia.

Circa 1990 the school submitted a request for additional classroom space and a gymnasium. By 2000 a $38.6 million renovation plan was presented and the school was in the process of approving it.

In 2020 the school had 1,300 total students. During the COVID-19 pandemic in Arizona the school made request for technology used for virtual learning, but delays meant the adequate technology was not delivered in time for the school year.

== Campus ==
Dodge Hall, or TC-10 opened as a dormitory in the 1930s. By 2000 its purposed change to have offices. It also has Manuelito Hall, or TC-5, another dormitory. It opened in 1919. In 1962 newer dormitories opened so Manuelito Hall became unoccupied in 1967. By 2000 that area was roped off. By then there was an application to make it a historic site. Tuba Hall, TC-3, opened in 1910. Like Manuelito it closed in 1967 after being supplanted by the 1962 dormitories.

== Student body ==
In 1974 the students came from Gray Mountain, Kayenta, Leupp, and other areas in the western portion of the Navajo Reservation. As of that year, many students originated with a lack of English comprehension and learned English as a second language. As of the same year, all of the students were of the Navajo ethnic group.
