= Tuba City High School =

Public high school in Coconino County, Arizona

Location
- Warrior Drive; Tuba City, Arizona 86045; United States
- Coordinates: 36°07′36″N 111°13′25″W

Information
- Type: Public high school
- Established: 1959 (67 years ago)
- School district: Tuba City Unified School District
- CEEB code: 030452
- Principal: Raye Lynn McCabe
- Grades: 9–12
- Enrollment: 687 (2023–2024)
- Colors: Green and white
- Mascot: Warrior
- Website: tcusd.org/tchs/

Tuba City High School is a high school in Tuba City, Arizona, under the jurisdiction of the Tuba City Unified School District.

== History ==
It was established in 1959 and is now one of two high schools in Tuba City. It directly adjoins Greyhills Academy High School, which opened in 1972; the two schools are separated by an iron fence and are traditional scholastic and athletic rivals.

In 1974, Tuba City High was funded by both the school district and by the Bureau of Indian Affairs, with two separate principals but with local and boarding school students attending the same classes.

Tuba City High School was awarded the 1982 National Cross Country Championship through the XC Legacy series published through Milesplit.us in an effort to begin filling in the national rankings from 1980 to 1988. The Harrier Magazine, operated by Marc Bloom formerly of Runners World Magazine began keeping official rankings in 1989. The National Title is the first for historic Coach Bud Davis and caps off a remarkable season and school Legacy of eight straight state titles, eleven in thirteen seasons. Tuba City High School's varsity volleyball team are 2012 Champions. Also, Tuba City High School's Cross-Country team took 1st in the state in 2013.
