= Willow Springs, Arizona =

- Populated place
- Location within the state of Arizona Willow Springs (the United States)
- Coordinates: 36°11′22″N 111°23′38″W
- Country: United States
- State: Arizona
- County: Coconino
- Elevation: 4,823 ft (1,470 m)
- Time zone: UTC-7 (Mountain (MST))
  - Summer (DST): UTC-7 (MST)
- Area code: 928
- GNIS feature ID: 24692

Willow Springs is a populated place situated in Coconino County, Arizona, United States.
