= Manila, Arizona =

- Populated place
- Location within the state of Arizona Manila (the United States)
- Coordinates: 34°57′54″N 110°24′48″W
- Country: United States
- State: Arizona
- County: Navajo
- Elevation: 4,954 ft (1,510 m)
- Time zone: UTC-7 (Mountain (MST))
  - Summer (DST): UTC-7 (MST)
- Area code: 928
- FIPS code: 04-44150
- GNIS feature ID: 24506

Manila is a populated place situated in Navajo County, Arizona, United States. Its name was bestowed during the Spanish–American War, being named after the Philippines' capital.
