= Moenave, Arizona =

- Populated place
- Location within the state of Arizona Moenave (the United States)
- Coordinates: 36°08′19″N 111°20′15″W
- Country: United States
- State: Arizona
- County: Coconino
- Elevation: 4,774 ft (1,455 m)
- Time zone: UTC-7 (Mountain (MST))
  - Summer (DST): UTC-7 (MST)
- Area code: 928
- FIPS code: 04-47260
- GNIS feature ID: 8157

Moenave, also known as Moa Ave, is a populated place situated in Coconino County, Arizona, United States. It was officially named Moenave as a result of a Board on Geographic Names decision in 1971. Moenave has an estimated elevation of 4,774 feet (1,455 m) above sea level.

Moenave became a notable destination after the completion of U.S. Route 160 through Arizona. During construction, it was discovered that a large concentration of dinosaur tracks have been preserved in what was once a shallow marshland. It is apparent that the area dried very quickly, turning the mud along with the dinosaur tracks into hardened rock, preserving them for millions of years. In addition to the tracks, poorly preserved remains of dinosaur bones can be found in the area. The best preserved fossils discovered in Moenave were removed by paleontologists to be displayed in museums. Residents of Moenave regularly offer guided tours of the area and are very knowledgeable of the different species that once trekked their land.
