= Tuba City, Arizona =

Town in Coconino County, Arizona

Tuba City, Arizona Tó Naneesdizí (Navajo)
- CDP
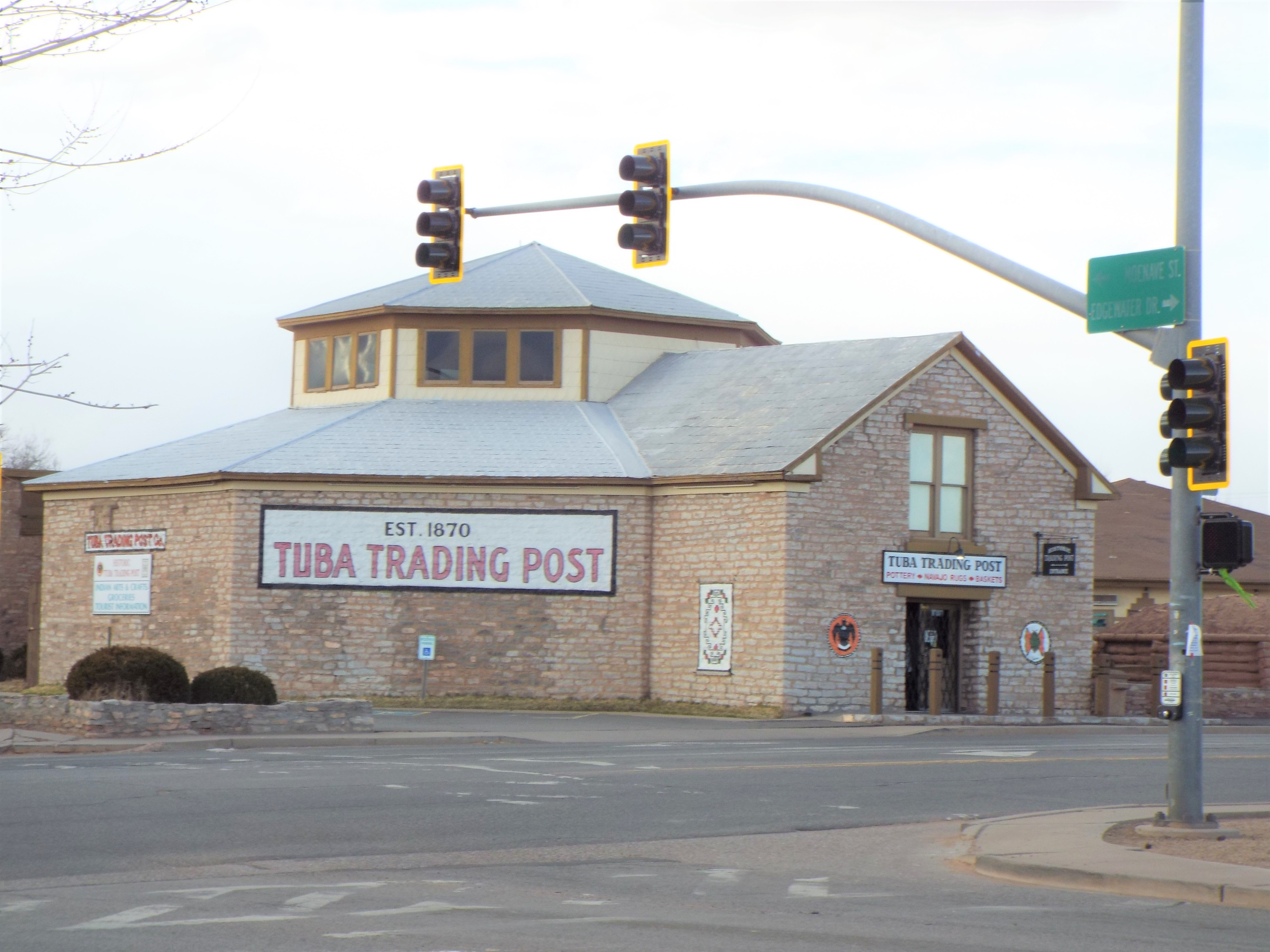
- Tuba Trading Post built in 1905

- Location in Coconino County and the state of Arizona

- Location in Arizona Tuba City (the United States)
- Coordinates: 36°07′30″N 111°14′50″W
- Country: United States
- State: Arizona
- County: Coconino

Government
  - Type: Navajo chapter
  - Chapter president: Gerald Keetso

Area
  - Total: 8.97 sq mi (23.24 km^{2})
  - Land: 8.97 sq mi (23.24 km^{2})
  - Water: 0 sq mi (0.00 km^{2})
- Elevation: 4,918 ft (1,499 m)

Population (2020)
  - Total: 8,072
- Time zone: UTC-7 (MST)
  - Summer (DST): UTC-6 (MDT)
- ZIP code: 86045
- Area code: 928
- FIPS code: 04-76010
- GNIS feature ID: 2409355

Tuba City (Navajo: Tó Naneesdizí) is an unincorporated town and census-designated place in Coconino County, Arizona, on the Navajo Nation, United States. It is the second-largest community in Coconino County. The population of the census-designated place (CDP) was 8,611 at the 2010 census.

It is the most populous community within the Navajo Nation, and the site of the headquarters of the Western Navajo Agency. The Hopi village of Moenkopi lies directly to its southeast. A Hopi minority also live in Tuba City; the majority are Navajo.

European Americans associated with The Church of Jesus Christ of Latter-day Saints named the town in honor of chief Tuuvi, a Hopi man from Oraibi. He converted to the Mormon faith and allowed their migrants to settle in this area.

The Navajo name for this community, Tó Naneesdizí, translates as "tangled waters". It likely refers to the many below-ground springs that are the source of several reservoirs.

Tuba City is located within the Painted Desert near the western edge of the Navajo Nation. Tuba City is located approximately 50 miles (80 km) from the eastern entrance to Grand Canyon National Park and approximately 78 miles (126 km) from Flagstaff.

== History ==
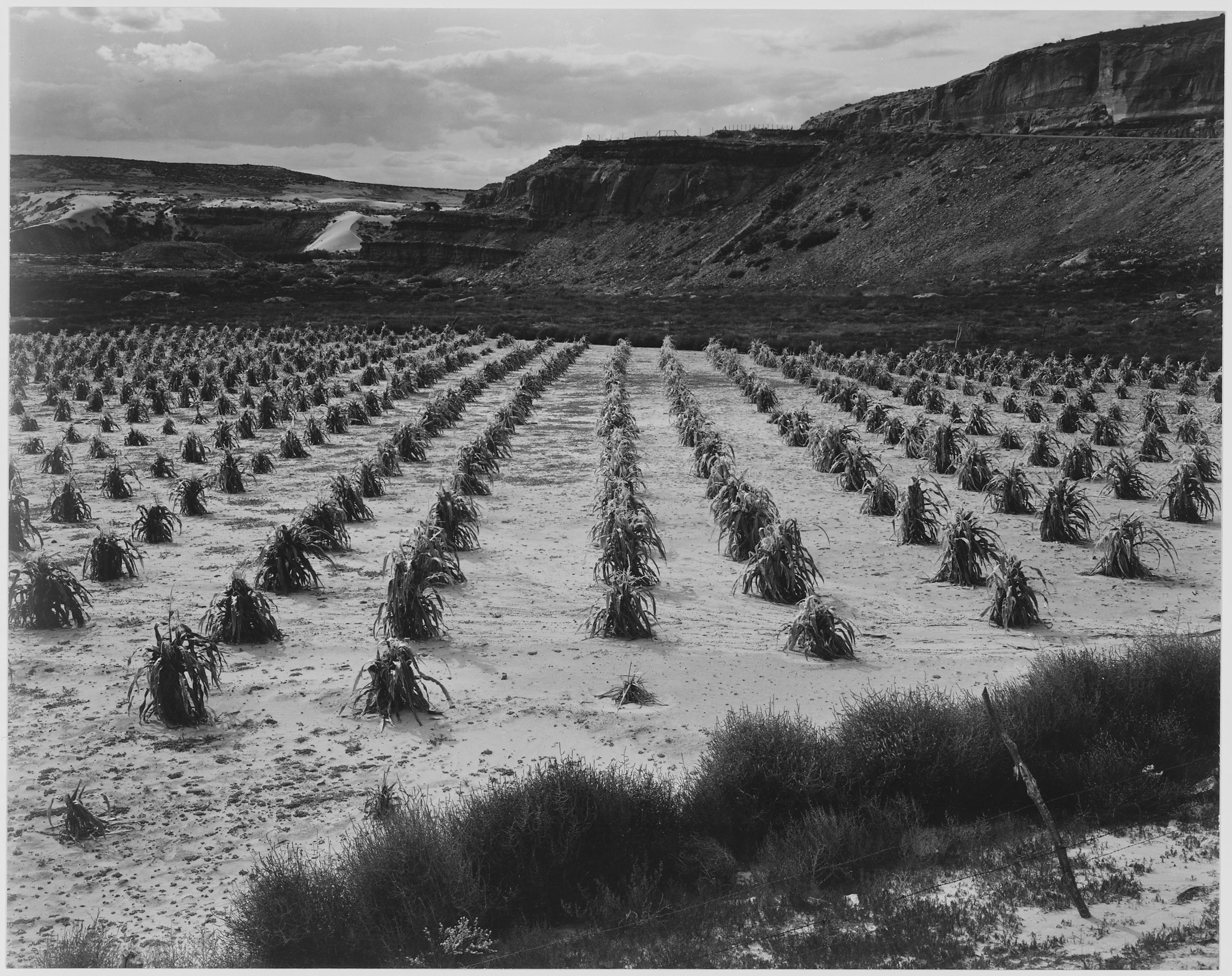
Tuba City cornfield, 1941. Photo by Ansel Adams

The Tuba City area was the territory of indigenous peoples for thousands of years. The community was first documented by Spanish explorers: Father Francisco Garcés visited the area in 1776, and recorded that the Hopi were cultivating crops.

European-American migrants came as part of the Mormon movement to the West in the late 19th century. They named the town after Tuuvi, a Hopi man who converted to Mormonism circa 1870. He had invited the Mormons to settle near his village of Moenkopi without requiring them to gain individual permission.

The Tuba City Trading Post was established in 1870. It dealt with the Navajo and Paiute who came to the area for the natural springs, as well as the Hopi already in the area. European-American Mormon emigrants claimed to found Tuba City in 1872.

In 1956, uranium mining began near Tuba City and the Rare Metals Corporation established a regional office and uranium processing mill. The Atomic Energy Commission had an office here as well. The mill closed in 1966, before environmental regulations were passed to protect the local people and resources. Reclamation of the mill site and tailings pile was completed in 1990 in response to the high radioactivity and environmentally hazardous waste products left behind.

The Tuba City Regional Health Care Corporation hospital is located in Tuba City. It is a non-profit, Native American-run health care corporation that employs 1,200 people. The next nearest hospital is in Flagstaff.

In 2023, the Tuba City Entrepreneurship Hub opened, sponsored by Change Labs, which is a Native-led nonprofit supporting entrepreneurship on tribal land through free work spaces for entrepreneurs, vendors, and artists within Native communities. It features community gardens raised by local farmers in the Change Labs program.

== Geography and climate ==
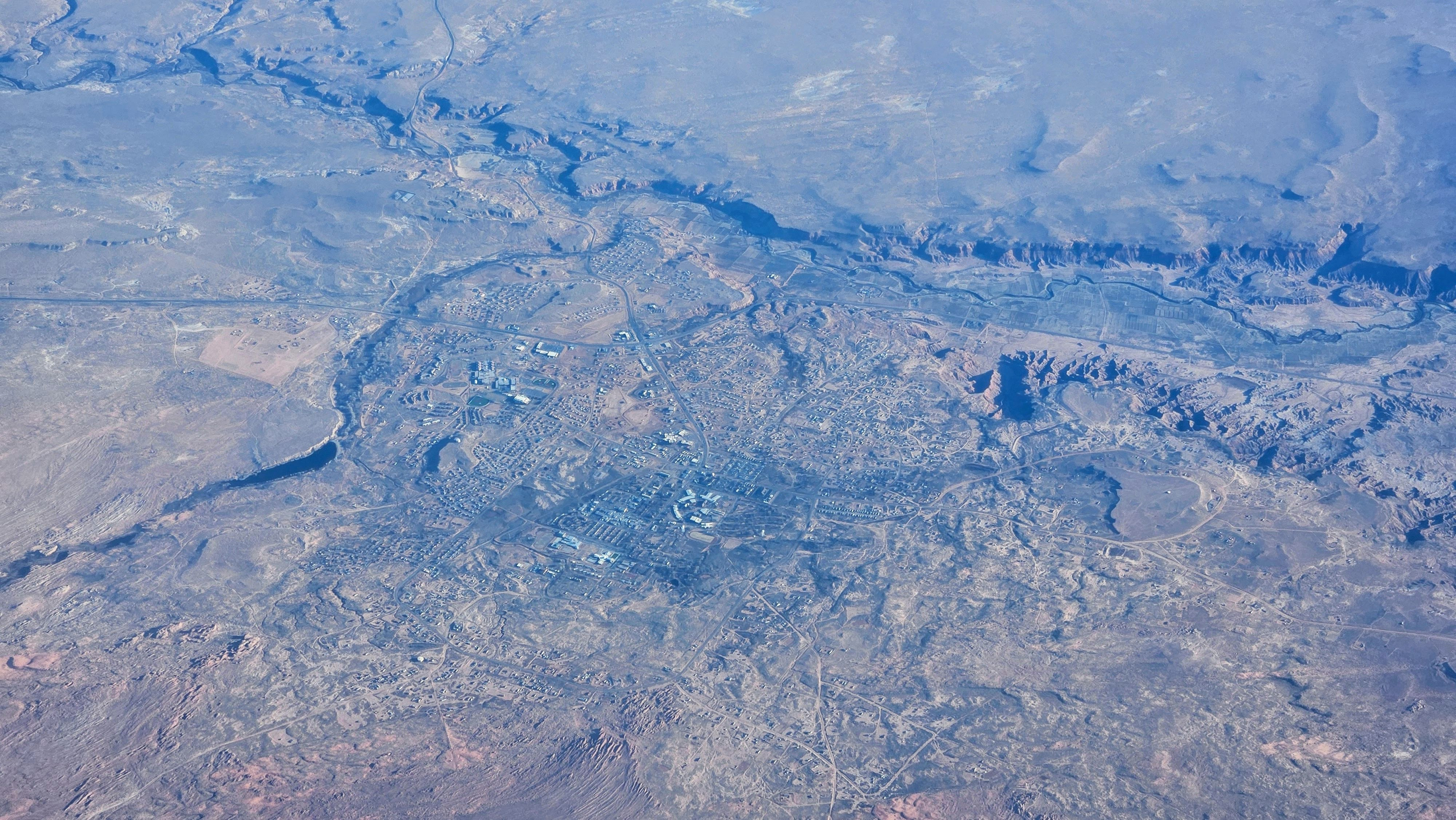
Tuba City from above in February 2024

According to the United States Census Bureau, the CDP has a total area of 8.9 square miles (23 km^{2}), all land.

Geologically, Tuba City is sited about the Glen Canyon Group from the early Jurassic (about 180–210 Ma) and on modern superficial Quaternary deposits.

It is located within the Painted Desert near the western edge of the Navajo Nation. The town is served by U.S. Route 160, near the junction with Arizona State Route 264. Tuba City is located approximately 50 miles (80 km) from the eastern entrance to Grand Canyon National Park and approximately 78 miles (126 km) from Flagstaff.

Arizona does not observe Daylight Saving Time, but the Navajo Nation does within its boundaries. In practice elements of Tuba City vary in practices: tribal offices and schools observe DST, while most private businesses conform to state practice and do not.

Tuba City is located in the rain shadow of the Mogollon Rim, which keeps out moisture from the Gulf of California. It has a cold desert climate (Köppen BWk) with hot, dry summers – though less hot than Phoenix – and cold, dry winters. Frosts are normal from October to April. The majority of winters do not have measurable snowfall due to the dryness of the air descending from mountains to the south.

Climate data for Tuba City, Arizona (1991–2020 normals, extremes 1897–2013)
Month	Jan	Feb	Mar	Apr	May	Jun	Jul	Aug	Sep	Oct	Nov	Dec	Year
Record high °F (°C)	67 (19)	76 (24)	84 (29)	94 (34)	100 (38)	110 (43)	110 (43)	108 (42)	103 (39)	95 (35)	81 (27)	71 (22)	110 (43)
Mean maximum °F (°C)	58.4 (14.7)	64.5 (18.1)	75.0 (23.9)	83.5 (28.6)	91.9 (33.3)	98.9 (37.2)	102.1 (38.9)	99.3 (37.4)	94.1 (34.5)	85.2 (29.6)	69.7 (20.9)	58.0 (14.4)	102.7 (39.3)
Mean daily maximum °F (°C)	47.0 (8.3)	54.0 (12.2)	62.6 (17.0)	70.7 (21.5)	80.1 (26.7)	91.3 (32.9)	94.8 (34.9)	92.3 (33.5)	84.9 (29.4)	72.9 (22.7)	58.4 (14.7)	46.3 (7.9)	71.3 (21.8)
Daily mean °F (°C)	35.4 (1.9)	40.6 (4.8)	48.3 (9.1)	55.0 (12.8)	64.3 (17.9)	74.0 (23.3)	79.2 (26.2)	77.3 (25.2)	69.4 (20.8)	57.5 (14.2)	44.8 (7.1)	34.6 (1.4)	56.7 (13.7)
Mean daily minimum °F (°C)	23.9 (−4.5)	27.2 (−2.7)	34.0 (1.1)	39.2 (4.0)	48.6 (9.2)	56.6 (13.7)	63.6 (17.6)	62.3 (16.8)	54.0 (12.2)	42.1 (5.6)	31.1 (−0.5)	22.8 (−5.1)	42.1 (5.6)
Mean minimum °F (°C)	13.4 (−10.3)	17.9 (−7.8)	23.8 (−4.6)	28.6 (−1.9)	34.6 (1.4)	43.7 (6.5)	56.0 (13.3)	54.0 (12.2)	42.9 (6.1)	29.0 (−1.7)	18.4 (−7.6)	11.1 (−11.6)	9.5 (−12.5)
Record low °F (°C)	−15 (−26)	−8 (−22)	5 (−15)	14 (−10)	12 (−11)	29 (−2)	37 (3)	33 (1)	20 (−7)	11 (−12)	−4 (−20)	−13 (−25)	−15 (−26)
Average precipitation inches (mm)	0.46 (12)	0.42 (11)	0.53 (13)	0.21 (5.3)	0.49 (12)	0.09 (2.3)	0.72 (18)	0.79 (20)	1.18 (30)	0.64 (16)	0.43 (11)	0.31 (7.9)	6.27 (159)
Average snowfall inches (cm)	0.4 (1.0)	0.7 (1.8)	0.1 (0.25)	0.0 (0.0)	0.0 (0.0)	0.0 (0.0)	0.0 (0.0)	0.0 (0.0)	0.0 (0.0)	0.0 (0.0)	0.0 (0.0)	0.7 (1.8)	1.9 (4.85)
Average precipitation days (≥ 0.01 inch)	3.5	3.9	3.9	1.9	2.4	1.0	3.9	5.4	4.5	3.4	2.2	2.9	38.9
Average snowy days (≥ 0.1 inch)	0.4	0.4	0.1	0.0	0.0	0.0	0.0	0.0	0.0	0.0	0.0	0.6	1.5
Source: NOAA(snowfall and snowy days 1981–2010)

== Demographics ==
Historical population
Census	Pop.	Note	%±
1980	5,045		—
1990	7,323		45.2%
2000	8,225		12.3%
2010	8,611		4.7%
2020	8,072		−6.3%
U.S. Decennial Census

=== Racial and ethnic composition ===
Tuba City CDP, Arizona – Racial composition Note: the US Census treats Hispanic/Latino as an ethnic category. This table excludes Latinos from the racial categories and assigns them to a separate category. Hispanics/Latinos may be of any race.
Race (NH = Non-Hispanic)	2020	2010	2000	1990	1980
White alone (NH)	2.6% (208)	3.8% (326)	5.2% (428)	7.9% (580)	14.4% (729)
Black alone (NH)	0.3% (21)	0.3% (27)	0.2% (13)	0.2% (17)	0.4% (20)
American Indian alone (NH)	91.9% (7,422)	90.3% (7,777)	90.9% (7,477)	89.8% (6,576)	83.1% (4,193)
Asian alone (NH)	1.4% (116)	0.8% (69)	0.2% (18)	0.5% (36)	0% (0)
Pacific Islander alone (NH)	0.1% (6)	0% (0)	0% (3)		
Other race alone (NH)	0% (1)	0% (0)	0% (0)	0% (2)	0% (0)
Multiracial (NH)	1.9% (151)	1.5% (125)	1.1% (92)	—	—
Hispanic/Latino (any race)	1.8% (147)	3.3% (287)	2.4% (194)	1.5% (112)	2% (103)

=== 2020 census ===
As of the 2020 census, Tuba City had a population of 8,072.

The median age was 33.0 years. 29.3% of residents were under the age of 18 and 12.0% were 65 years of age or older. For every 100 females there were 91.5 males, and for every 100 females age 18 and over there were 87.8 males age 18 and over.

88.1% of residents lived in urban areas, while 11.9% lived in rural areas.

There were 2,211 households in Tuba City, of which 47.0% had children under the age of 18 living in them. Of all households, 34.2% were married-couple households, 18.4% were households with a male householder and no spouse or partner present, and 40.1% were households with a female householder and no spouse or partner present. About 19.8% of all households were made up of individuals and 5.3% had someone living alone who was 65 years of age or older.

There were 2,550 housing units, of which 13.3% were vacant. The homeowner vacancy rate was 0.1% and the rental vacancy rate was 7.3%.

=== Language ===
Languages (2000)	Percent
Spoke Navajo at home	61.2%
Spoke English at home	37.5%
Spoke Hopi at home	0.5%
Spoke Spanish at home	0.8%

=== Demographic estimates ===
According to 2015 census estimates, the average household size was 4.00 and the average family size was 4.49.

The estimated age distribution included 9.8% from 18 to 24, 27.5% from 25 to 44, and 15.7% from 45 to 64.

Census Bureau profile estimates reported that 1.5% of residents were foreign born, 6.6% were under age 5, and the age 65 and older population included 7.2% ages 65 to 74, 3.2% ages 75 to 84, and 0.6% ages 85 and older.

=== Income and poverty ===
The median household income was $57,045, while median family income was $58,750; married-couple families had a median income of $86,979, non-families had $41,875, and per capita income was $20,287. About 23.1% of the population was below the poverty line.

In 2015 estimates, males had a median income of $29,280 versus $26,855 for females; poverty rates were 33.0% for those under age 18 and 44.8% for those age 65 or over.

== Attractions ==
- The Explore Navajo Interactive Museum, opened in 2007, is located next to the historic Tuba City Trading Post.
- The Hopi tribe's Tuuvi Travel Center opened in 2008, a complex that cost $6.3 million. The Hopi Nation plan a $100 million "Gateway to Hopiland" nearby.
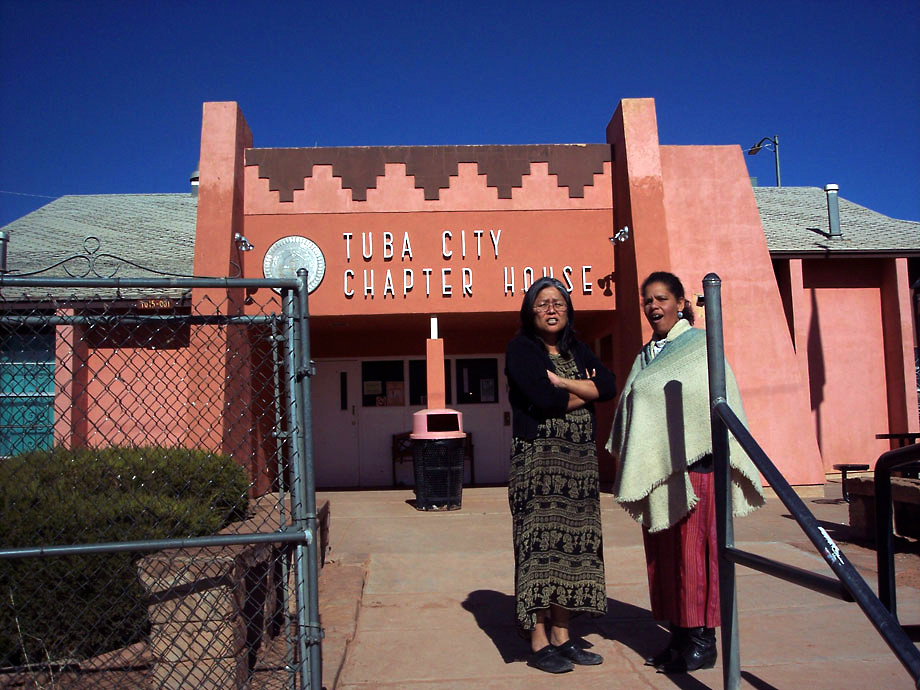
Tuba City Chapter House of the Navajo Nation.

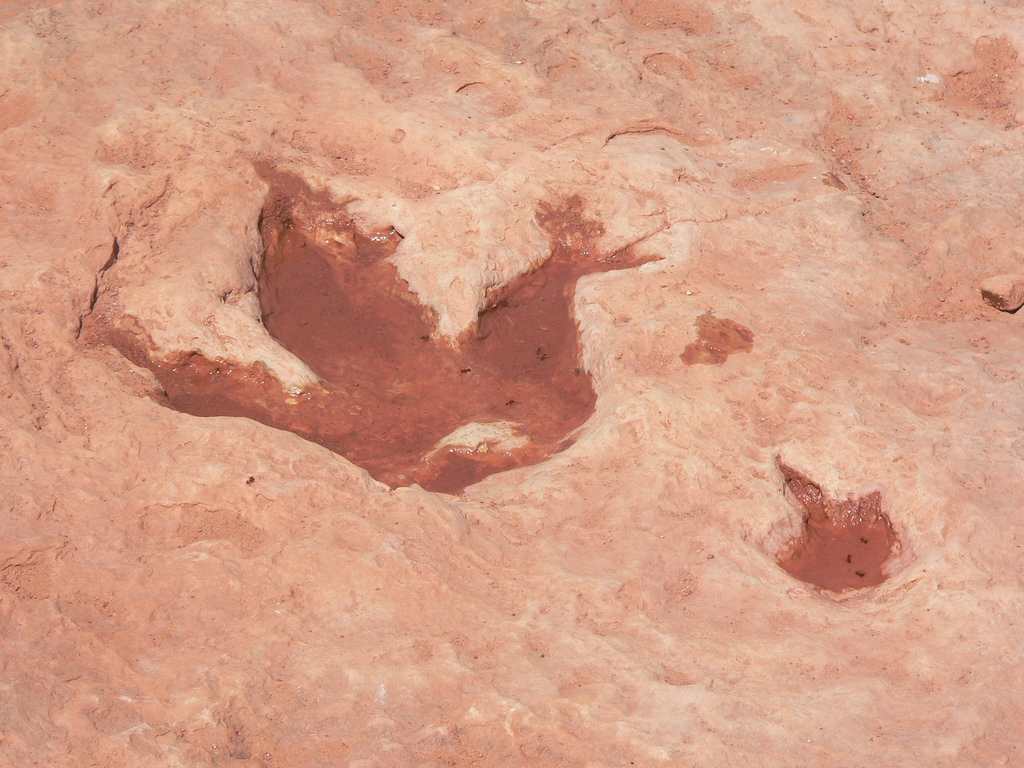
Dinosaur track in Tuba City

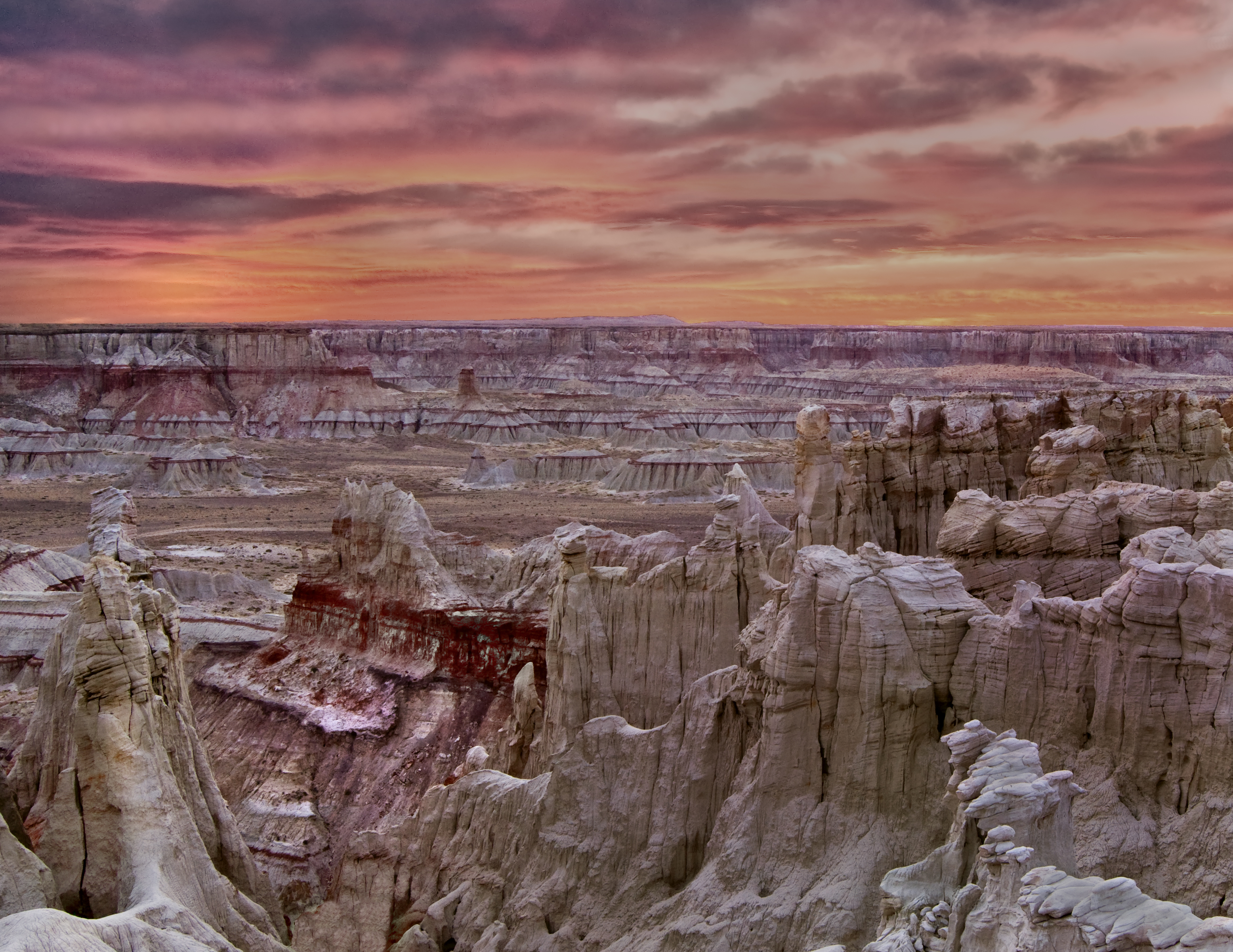
Coal Mine Canyon at sunset

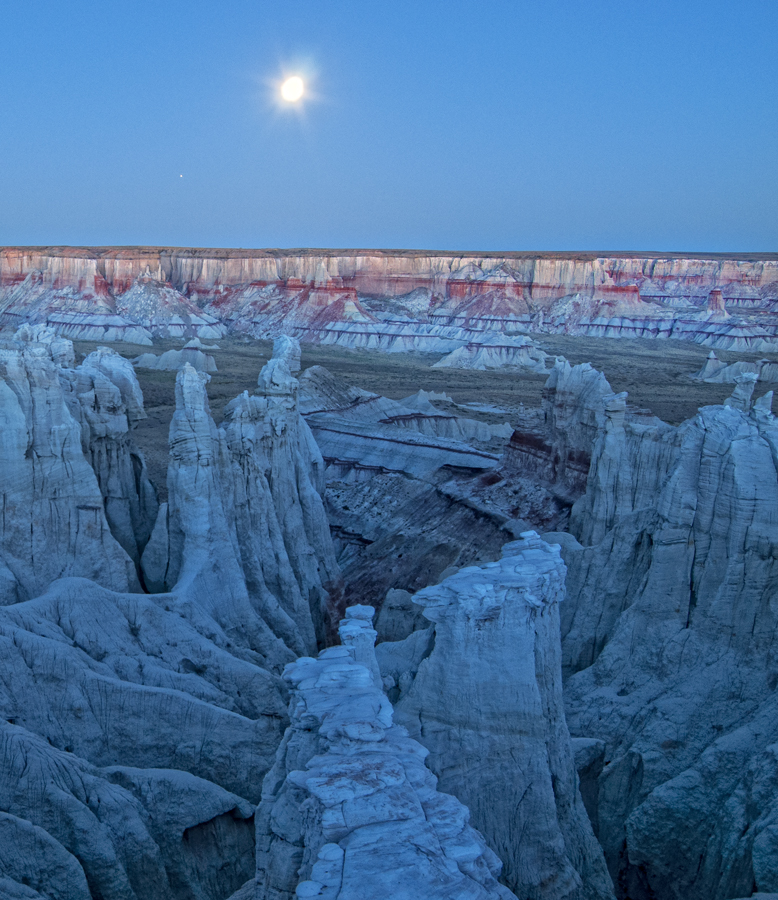
Moonrise at Coal Mine Canyon

== Transportation ==
The town is served by U.S. Route 160, near the junction with Arizona State Route 264.

It is served by the Tuba City Airport.

Navajo Transit System provides connections to Flagstaff and Fort Defiance. Hopi Senom Transit provides connections to Moenkopi. Express provides connecting service to Page.

== Education ==
The area is served by the Tuba City Unified School District, as well as several tribal/federal schools within the area, including Tuba City High School

Bureau of Indian Education (BIE) schools include:

- Greyhills Academy High School (tribal)
- Tuba City Boarding School (Bureau-operated) established 1906

Moencopi Day School (tribal) is in nearby Moenkopi.

Tertiary institutions include Diné College Tuba City Center

== Notable people ==
- Ethel Branch, attorney and politician
- Quannah Chasinghorse, a model, indigenous rights activist, and climate change activist, was born in Tuba City
- Mary Morez, artist, was born near Tuba City
- Jonathan Nez, ninth President of the Navajo Nation
- Lori Piestewa, a soldier in the US Army, was killed in southern Iraq in 2003. In honor of her, Squaw Peak in Phoenix was renamed Piestewa Peak in 2008
- Sunshine Sykes, a federal judge on the Central District of California
- Aaron Yazzie, a mechanical engineer at NASA's Jet Propulsion Laboratory, was born in Tuba City
