= Patagonian Welsh =

Dialect of Welsh in Argentina

- Cymraeg y Wladfa
- Native to: Argentina
- Region: Chubut
- Ethnicity: Welsh Argentines
- Language family: Indo-European: Celtic; Insular Celtic; Brittonic; Western Brittonic; Welsh; Patagonian Welsh
- Writing system: Latin (Welsh alphabet)

Language codes
- ISO 639-3: –
- Glottolog: pata1258
- IETF: cy-u-sd-aru

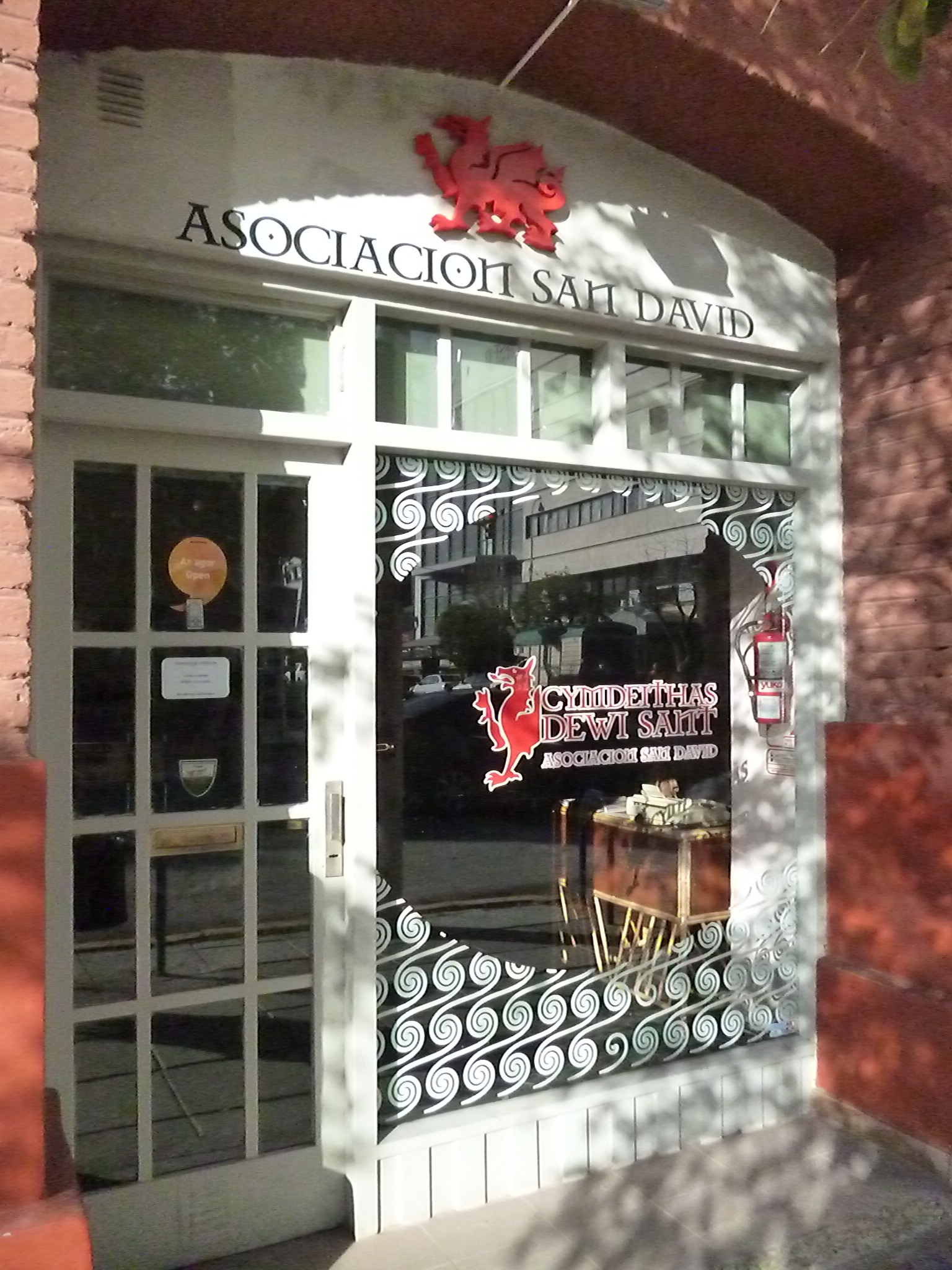
Headquarters of the Asociación San David. Welsh: Cymdeithas Dewi Sant.

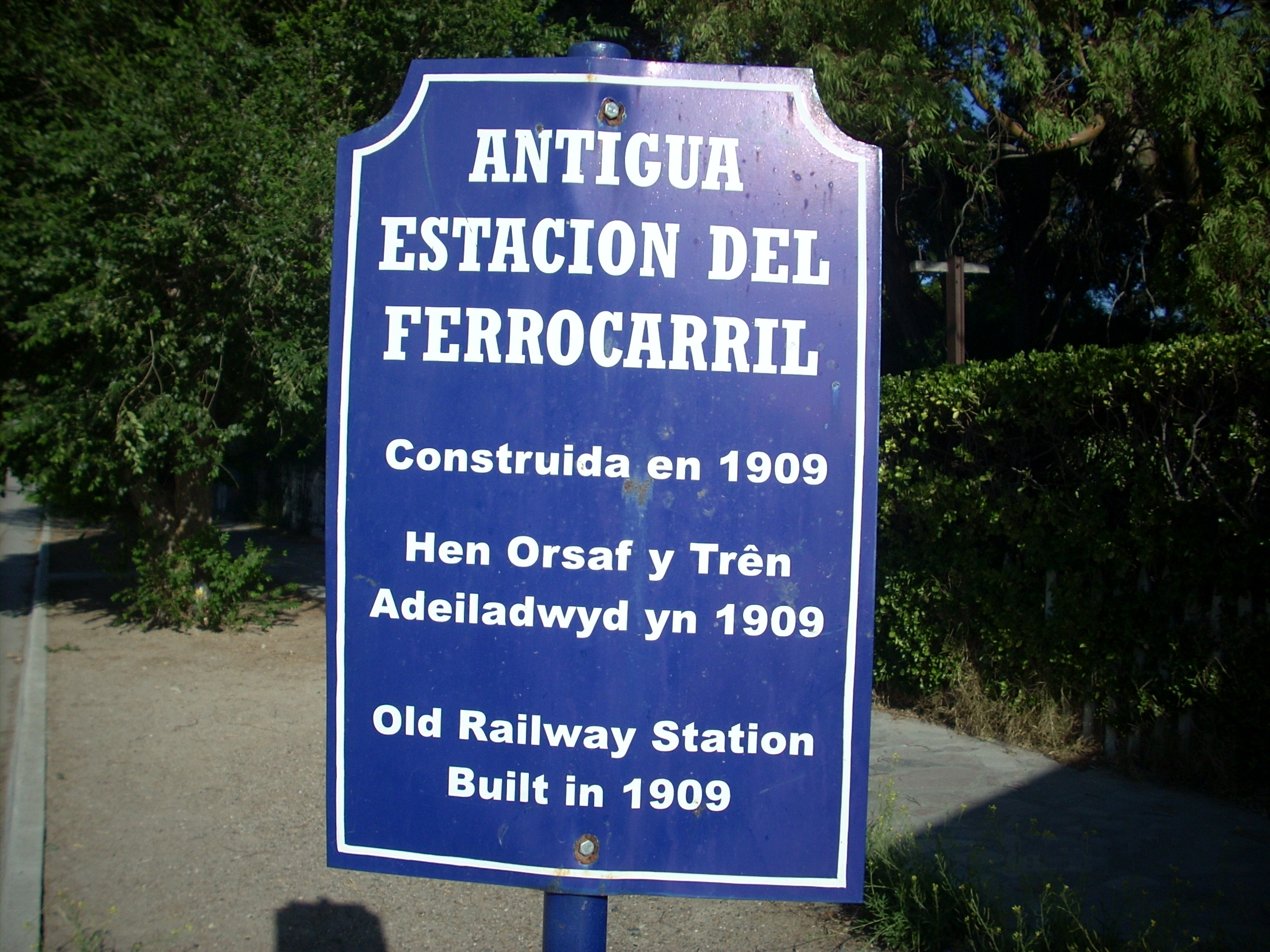
Trilingual signal in Gaiman

Patagonian Welsh (Welsh: Cymraeg y Wladfa) is a variety of the Welsh language spoken in the Patagonia region's Y Wladfa, Welsh settlements located in Chubut Province, Argentina. Though Patagonian Welsh is distinct from the several dialects used in Wales itself, the dialects have a high degree of mutual intelligibility, and speakers from Wales and Patagonia are able to communicate readily. Numerous toponyms throughout the Chubut Valley are of Welsh origin.

Teachers are sent from Wales to teach the language and to train local tutors in the Welsh language. There is some prestige in knowing the language, even among those not of Welsh descent. Welsh education and projects are mainly funded by the Welsh Government, British Council, Cardiff University and the Welsh–Argentine Association. In 2005, there were 62 Welsh classes in the area and Welsh was taught as a subject in two primary schools and two colleges in the region of Gaiman. There is also a bilingual Welsh–Spanish language school called Ysgol yr Hendre situated in Trelew, and a college located in Esquel. In 2016, there were three bilingual Welsh–Spanish primary schools in Patagonia.

In 2024–25, the number of registered learners—encompassing students in schools and adult programs—reached 1106, a significant increase from 623 in 2020.

The formal Eisteddfod poetry competitions have been revived, and are now bilingual in Welsh and Spanish.

== Language uses ==
=== Language education ===
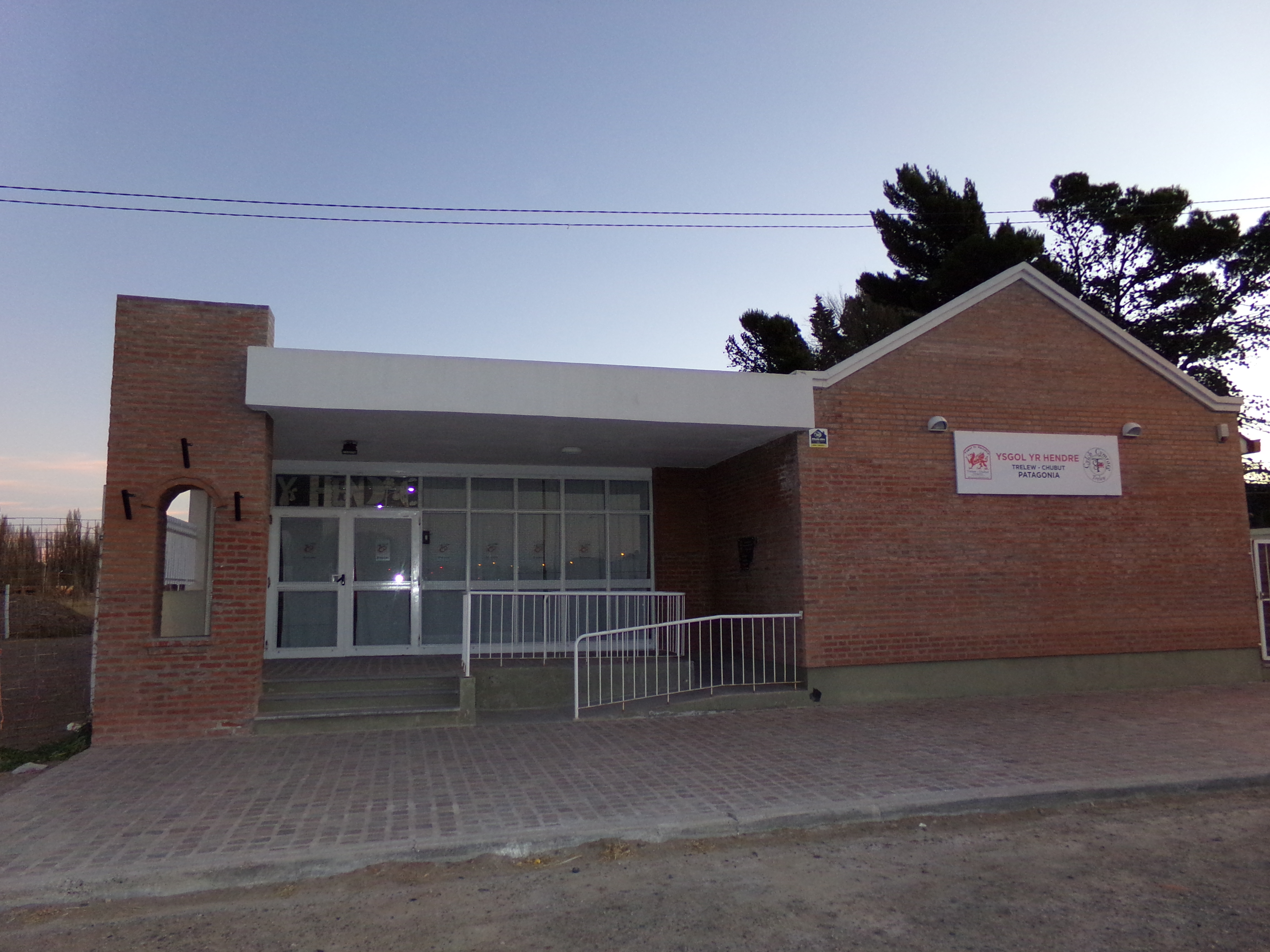
Ysgol yr Hendre in Trelew – a school designed to reinstate Welsh as a living language to local children

Around 2005, 62 Welsh classes were taught in Chubut and language was also on the curriculum of a kindergarten, two primary schools and two schools in the area of Gaiman (including a school dating from 1899), as well as a bilingual Welsh–Spanish school located in Trelew and a school in Esquel. Welsh classes in the Andes region have been held since 1996. The Welsh Institute of Trevelin and Esquel was born from a joint project of the National Assembly of Wales, the British Council and the Government of the Province of Chubut.

Since the late 1990s, the Wales–Argentina Association has run a program to increase the teaching and use of the Welsh language in Chubut. For 15 years, the plan succeeded in creating a new type of Welsh-speakers in Patagonia (Welsh speakers as a second language, mostly young). By 1997, most of the students were adults and there was only one school for children. Four years later, there were 263 hours of Welsh classes per week and 846 students, of whom 87% were children and young people (in Gaiman, 95% of those attending such classes were under the age of 20).

One of the functions of the Wales–Argentina Association is also to organise teacher and student exchange trips between Wales and Argentina: it has a representative on the British Council's Welsh Teaching Project Commission which has sent Welsh teachers to Chubut and financially supports a student attending an intensive Welsh language course held annually. It also has links with colleges and schools in both Wales and Chubut, where it subsidises and provides support to students.

In May 2015, the local government of Trelew announced free intensive Welsh language classes for the city's inhabitants under the name of Cwrs Blasu ("Taster Course"). Ann-Marie Lewis, a Welsh teacher, travelled to Patagonia exclusively to teach the language.

==== Welsh–Spanish bilingual schools ====
For the 150th anniversary of the colony, an association was created in Trevelin to form the first Spanish–Welsh bilingual school in the 16 de Octubre Valley under the name of Ysgol Gymraeg yr Andes, which will be public, but privately managed. The intention of the school was to bring back Welsh as a spoken language into the community. Fifteen families initially showed an interest in the project.

=== Literature and journalism ===
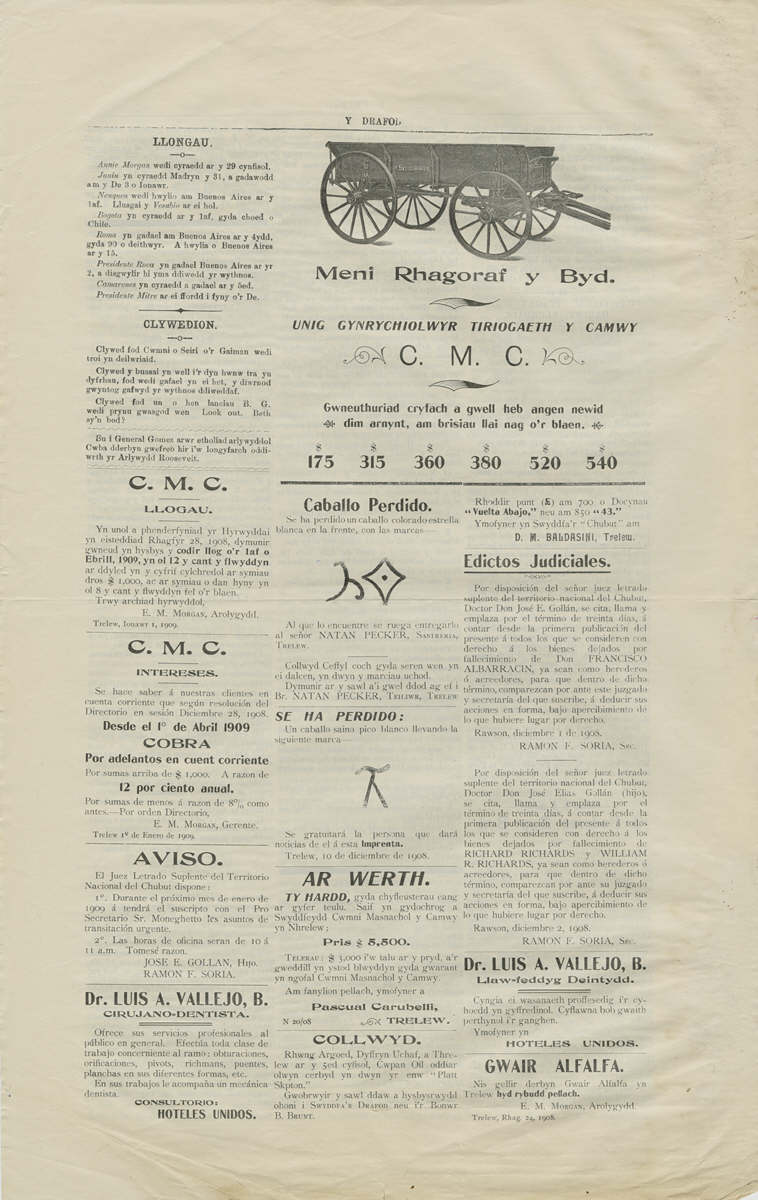
Newsletter Y Drafod

Poetry and literature books have been published since the early years of the colony, while the first newspapers, such as the Y Drafod, published bilingually in Welsh and Spanish, date from the 1890s.

=== Eisteddfod ===
In September the Eisteddfod for young people is held in Gaiman and in October for adults. Also, they are held in Trevelin, Dolavon and Puerto Madryn. Competitions are conducted in both Welsh and Spanish.

== Vocabulary ==
The dialect contains local adoptions from Spanish or borrowings from English, not present in the Welsh spoken in Wales.

Patagonian Welsh	Welsh (Wales)	English	Rioplatense Spanish
Singlet	Fest	vest, singlet	chaleco
Poncin	Pwmpen	pumpkin	zapallo
Mynd i baseando	Mynd am dro	to go for a walk	ir de paseo / ir paseando
Corral	Corlan	sheepfold, corral	corral
Pasiwch	Dewch i mewn	enter! / come in!	¡pase!
Costio	N/a	(to) accost	costar

== Gallery ==
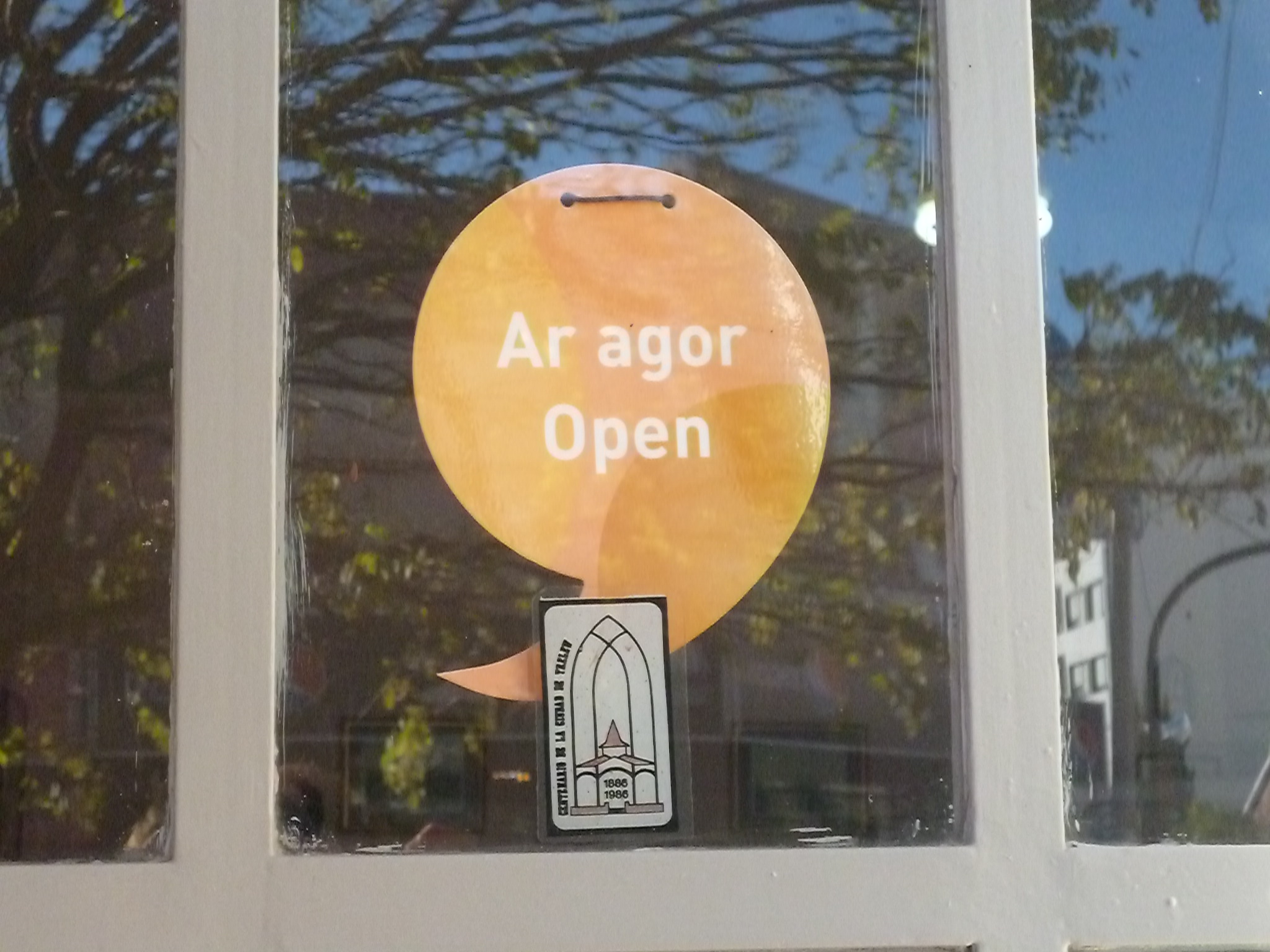
Ar agor / Open in Welsh and English in Trelew.

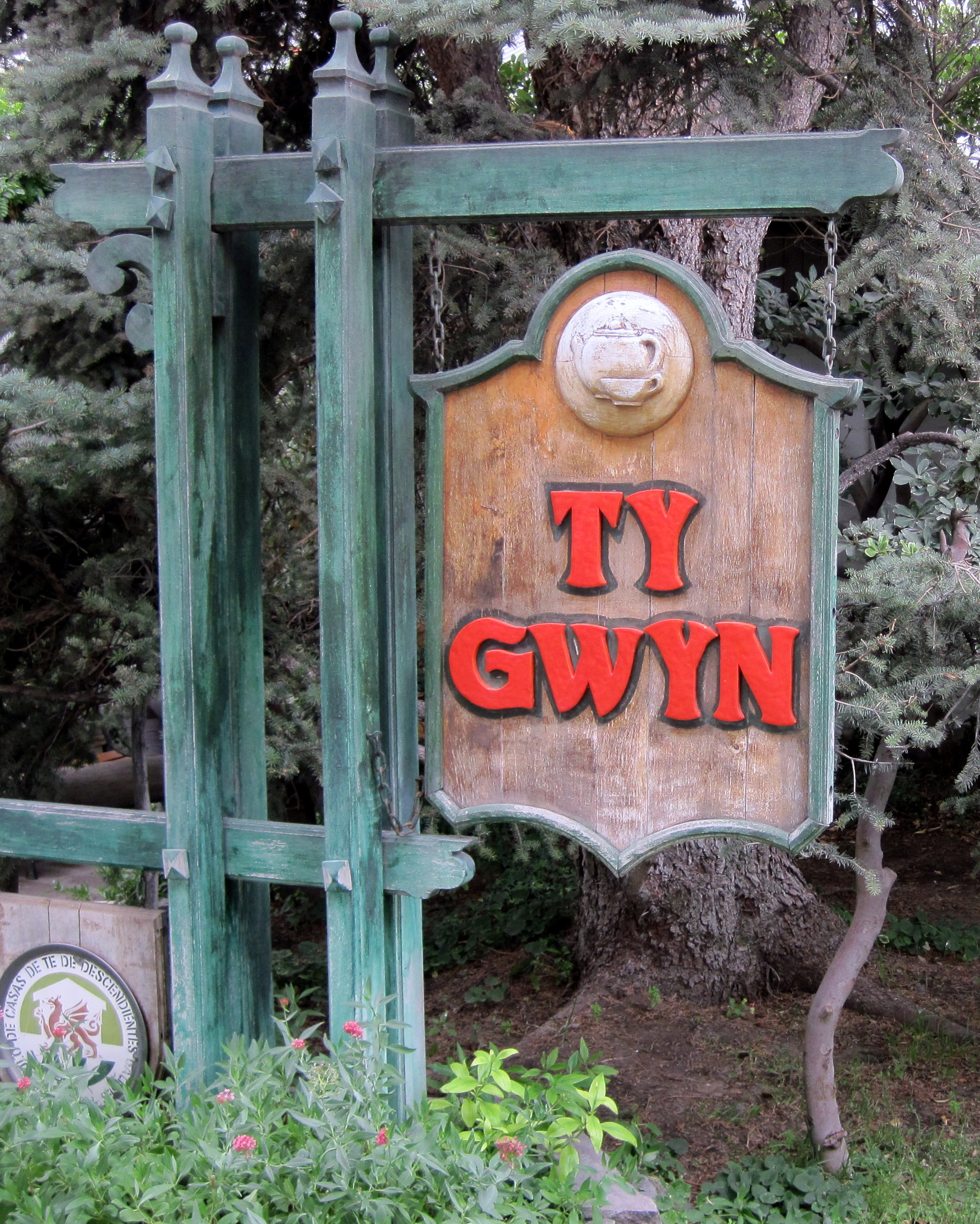
Tea house in Gaiman.

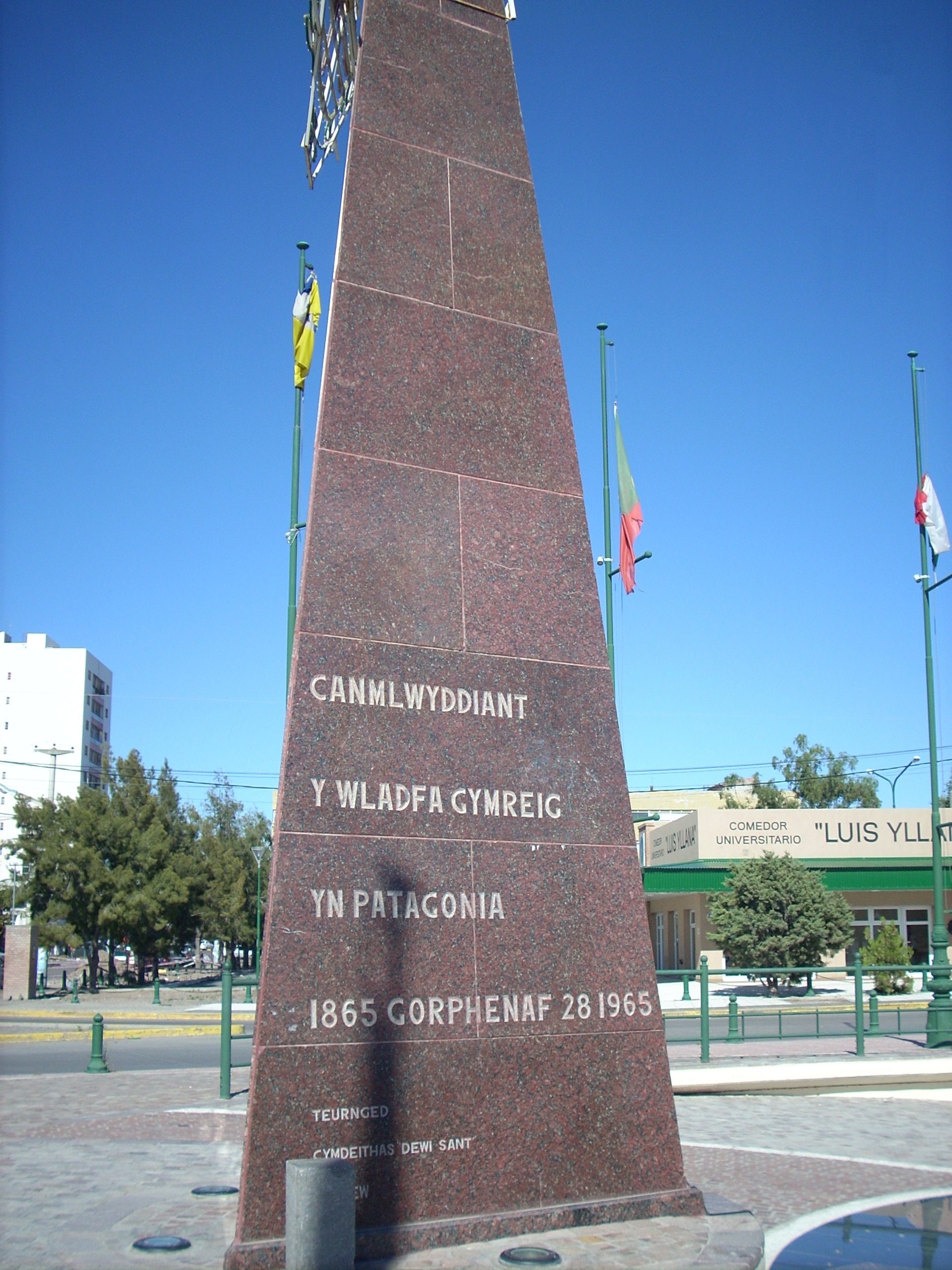
Memorial to commemorate the centenary of Welsh settlement in Trelew.

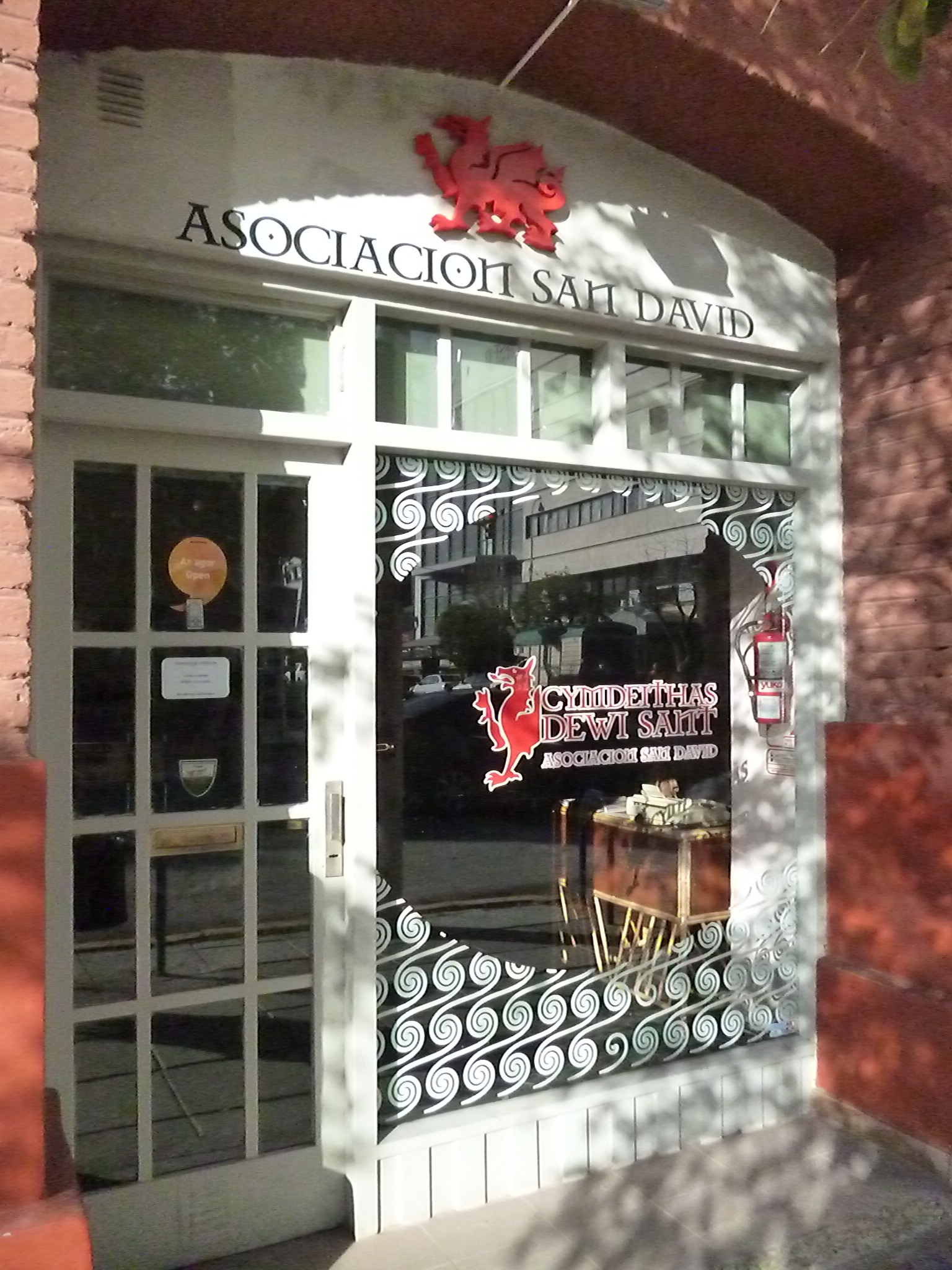
St David's Society, Trelew.

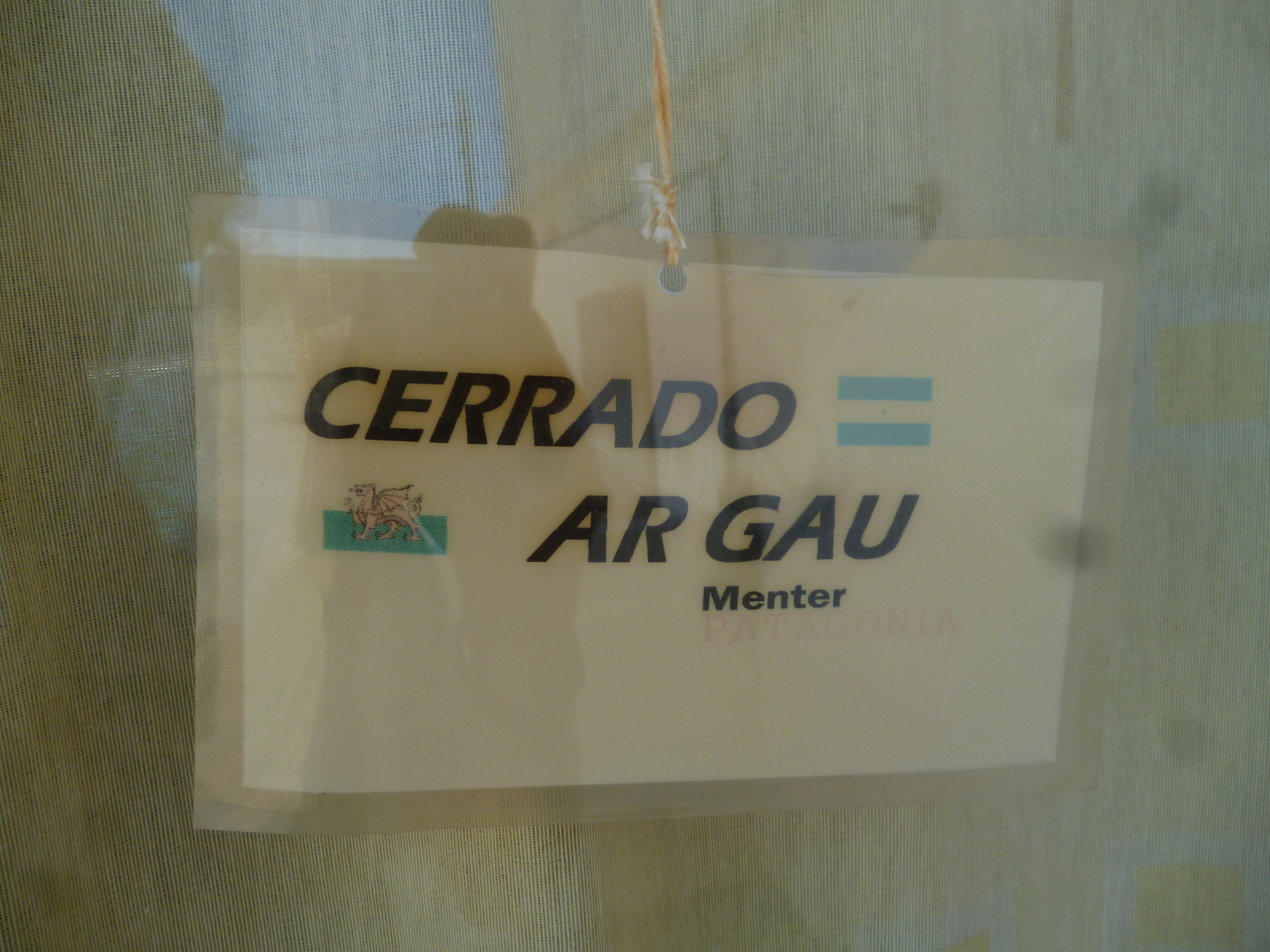
Closed (Spanish: Cerrado) / Ar Gau, Puerto Madryn.

== Welsh toponymy of Patagonian sites ==
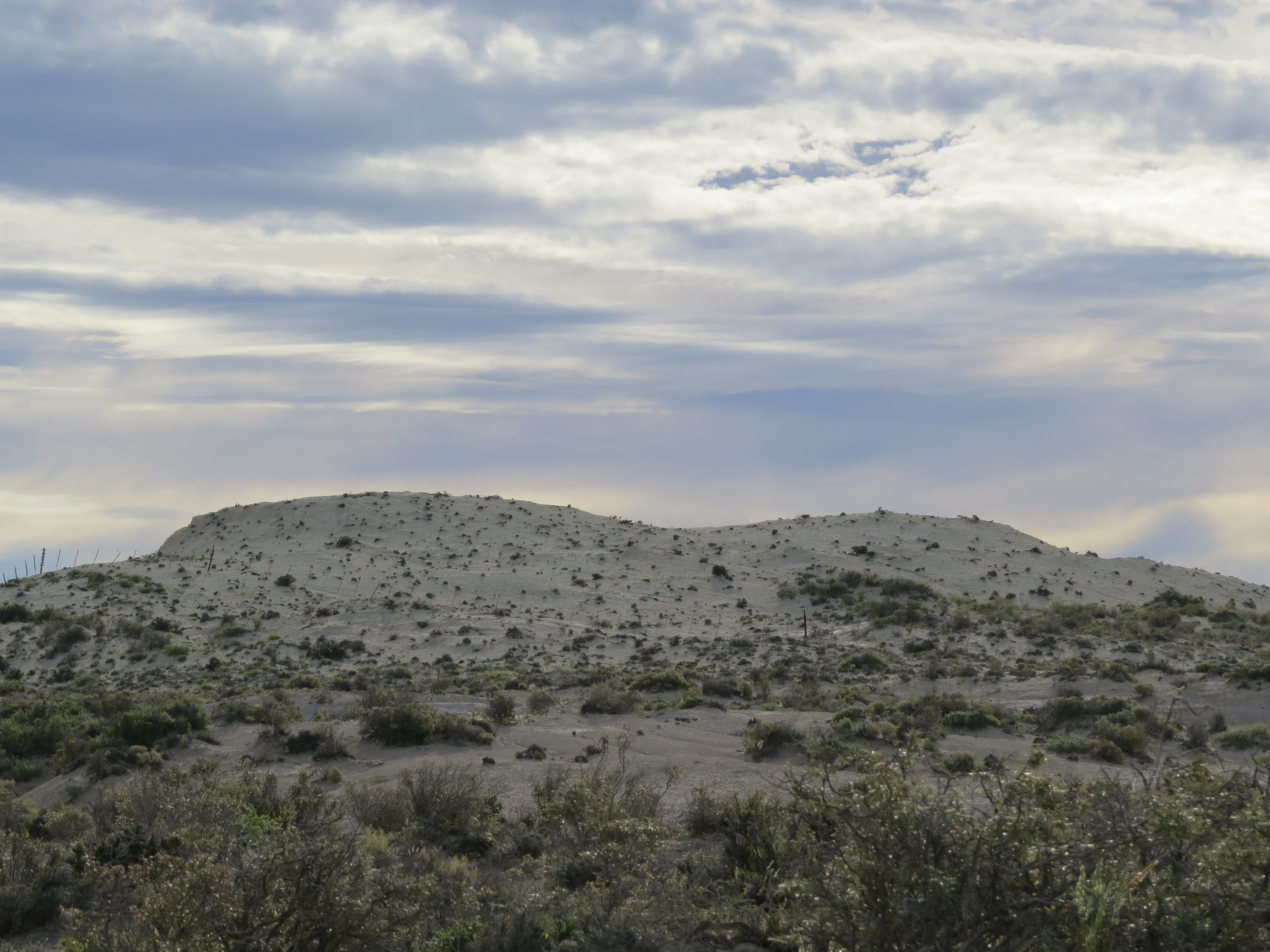
Loma Blanca (in Welsh Bryn Gwyn) south of Gaiman

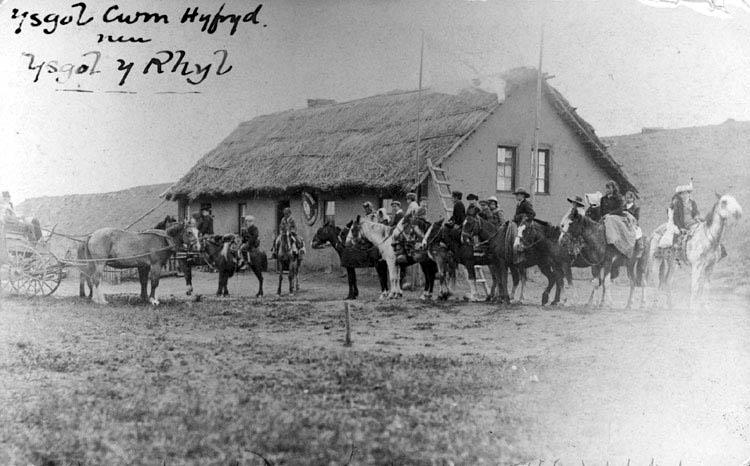
Original photograph of the 16 de octubre Valley School (Ysgol Cwm Hyfryd) with inscriptions in Welsh

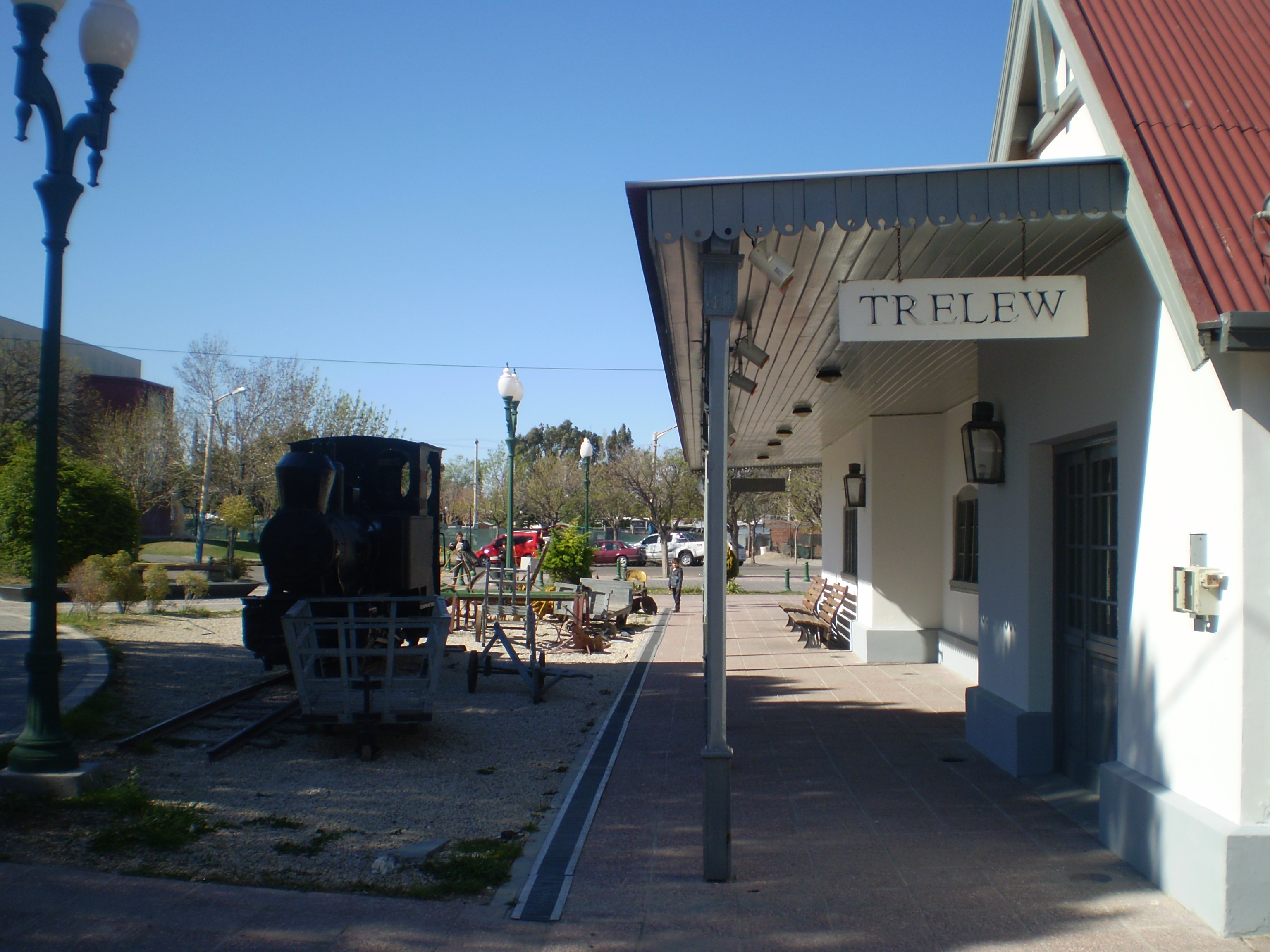
Platform of the former Trelew train station («pueblo de Luis»)

When the Welsh settlers arrived in Patagonia, they did not have immediate contact with the Tehuelche or Mapuche natives, who already had their own toponymy for the region. Because of this, they needed to name the landscapes of their new home.

Puerto Madryn was the first Welsh toponym. The name of the city commemorates Love Jones Parry, Baron of Madryn in Wales. The place name originated towards the end of 1862, when Love Jones Parry, accompanied by Lewis Jones, travelled to Patagonia aboard the Candelaria ship to decide whether that region was suitable for a Welsh colony.

In the Chubut river valley, some of the toponyms of villages and rural areas arose from the peculiarities of the terrain (such as Bryn Gwyn, "white hill", or Tyr Halen, "salt land"), from the names of the farms donated by the Argentine government, or by a chapel erected in the area (as in the case of Bethesda or Ebenezer).

There are also tributes to people, such as Trelew, where "Lew" is an abbreviation for Lewis Jones; or compound names derived from geographical features (for example, Dolavon, where Dol is meadow or lap and afon, river) or even from buildings (such as Trevelin, where Tre is town and felin, mill, for John Daniel Evans' flour mill).

Some toponyms created by the Welsh survive, but others have been lost. In 2015 a project called Gorsedd y Cwmwl emerged, aimed at restoring the original name of the Trono de las Nubes hill given by the first Welsh people who inhabited the 16 de Octubre valley and forgotten by the population, since the mountain is also called La Monja.

Spanish	Welsh	English
Argentina	Yr Ariannin	Argentina / The Argentine
Arroyo Carbón	Nant y Glo	
Arroyo de los Saltos	Nant y Fall	Stream of the Fall; nant "stream", north-western Welsh ffôl = rockfall from Eng. fall; English spelling used in the name. Possibly "cascade, waterfall" as a local meaning.
Arroyo Lepá	Afon Eira	Snow River
Arroyo Pescado	Nant y Pysgod	Stream of the Fishes
Arroyo Perdido	Afon Hafesp	
Bajo de los Huesos	Pant yr Esgyrn	Hollow of the Bones
	Banau Beiddio	
Cabeza de Buey	Pen yr Ych	
Cajón de Ginebra	Bocs Gin	Crate of Gin
	Caer Wydyr	
Cañada Carbon	Hafn y Glo	
Cañada Negra	Glyn Du	Black Glen
Cerro Cóndor	Craig yr Eryr	Eagle Hill
Cerro Langley	Carreg Langley	Langley Rock
Cerro Morgan/Cerro Montesino	Mynydd Morgan	Morgan Mountain
Cerro Nahuel Pan	Mynydd Llwyd	Grey Mountain
Cerro Ojo Negro	Trofa Llygad Du < trofa'r llygad du	River-bend of the Black Eye
Cerro Trono de las Nubes	Gorsedd y Cwmwl	Throne of the Cloud
	Coedwig Fochno	
	Cors Fochno	
Cordón Kaquel	Craig Cŵts	
Dique Florentino Ameghino / El Dique	Yr Argae	The Dam / Florentino Ameghino Dam
Cerro Cuche	Mynydd Edwin	Edwin's Mountain
El Saltiral	Llyn Halen Mawr	Large Salt Lake
Estepa patagónica	Y Paith (lit. the prairie)	Patagonian steppe
	Ffrwd Y Gaseg	
Fuerte Aventura	Caer Antur < caer yr antur	Fort of the Venture / Endeavour
La Angostura	Lle Cul	Narrow Place
Lago Carlos Pelligrini/Lago Mosquito	Llyn Tegid	
Lago Cholila	Llyn Peris	
Lago Lezama	Llyn Tsolile	
Lago Ogwen	Llyn Ogwen	Ogwen Lake
Lago Palena/Lago General Vintter	Llyn Winter	
Lago Rivadavia	Llyn Padarn	
Lago Rosario	Llyn y Fall	
Lago Situacion	Llyn y Morwynion	Lake of the Maidens
Laguna Aleusco	Llyn Halen	Salt Lake
Laguna de Aaron	Llyn Aaron	Aaron Lagoon
Laguna del Condór	Llyn y Tarw	Bull Lake
Laguna/Bajo del Diablo	Llyn y Gŵr Drwg	Devil Lagoon
Laguna Carao	Llyn Caradog	Caradog's Lake
Laguna de los Dos Ejidos	Llyn Pyrlid	
Laguna Grande	Llyn Mawr	Big Lagoon
Laguna Negra	Llyn Du	Black Lake
Las Plumas	Dôl y Plu	Meadow of the Feathers
Lago Engaño	Llyn Gwynedd	Gwynedd Lake
	Llosgwm	
Loma Blanca	Bryn Gwyn	White Hill
Loma María	Bryniau Meri	Mary's Hills
Loma Redonda	Bryn Crwn	Round Hill
Lomita de Alun	Boncyn Alun/Bryn Calfaria	Alun's Hillock/Calvary Hill
Lomita de La Leona	Boncyn Llewas	Lioness' Hillock
Los Pozos/Pozo Llave	Ffynnon Allwedd	
Cordón la Grasa	Mynyddoedd Oer	Cold Mountains
Pampa de Agnia y Laguna de Agnia	Llyn Ania / Pant y Ffwdan	Ania Lake / Hollow of the Commotion
Paso de Indios	Rhyd yr Indiaid	Ford of the Indians
Paso Berwyn	Rhyd Berwyn	Ford of Berwyn, Berwyn's Ford
Pocitos de Quichaura	Bryn y Ffynon	Hill of the well
Península Valdés	Gorynys Valdés	Valdés Peninsula
Provincia del Chubut	Talaith Chubut / Camwy	Chubut Province
Provincia de Río Negro	Talaith Afon Ddu	Black River Province
Provincia de Santa Cruz	Talaith Y Groes Wen	Holy Cross Province
Pueblo de Luis	Trelew	Town of Llewelyn (the Welsh form of Lewis, with a short form Llew. (Tre = town) + (soft mutation LL > L) + (Llew) = tre Lew, Trelew
Pueblo del Molino	Trevelin < tre'r felin	Mill Village
Puerto Deseado	Borthaethwy	
Puerto Madryn	Porth Madryn	Cove (of) Madryn (after Castell Madryn in north-west Wales, seat of Sir Love Jones-Parry, a supporter of the plan for a Welsh settlement. In 1862 or 1863 the ship Candelaria on which he was sailing, investigating suitable sites for the settlement, took refuge from a storm in this bay)
Punta Cuevas	Penrhyn yr Ogofâu	Caves Point ("headland (of) the caves")
	Pwynt Y Byrddau	
Rawson	Trerawson	Rawsontown
Río Chico	Afon Fach	Little River
Río Chubut	Afon Camwy	Sinuous River (cam = sinuous, -wy = supposed suffix meaning stream, river)
Río Corintos	Aber Gyrants	Stream of the Currants (N.B. NOT Currents). Welsh aber "estuary", but also "stream" in north Wales; north-western cyran(t)s "currants, Corinthian grapes" with initial mutation C > G)
Río Encuentro	Afon y Cymer	
Río Futaleufú/ Río Grande	Afon Fawr	Big River
Río Helio	Avon Iâ	Ice River
Río Tecka	Afon Teca/Afon Sacmata/Afon Ioan	
Salina Grande y Salina Chica	Y Llynnoedd Heliaidd	The Salty/Brackish Lakes
Sierra Chata	Craig y Werfa	Rock at the Werfa (south-eastern Welsh = shady place; also a minor place-name in south-east Wales)
Tecka	Hafn Lâs	Blue Gorge (if referring to rocks); Green Gorge (if referring to the vegetation)
Tierra Salada / Veintiocho de Julio	Tir Halen < "tir yr halen"	Salt Land
Torre José	Tŵr Joseph	Joseph's Tower
Travesía de Edwin	Hirdaith Edwin	
Tres Sauces	Tair Helygen	Three Willows (literally "three willow")
Valle 16 de Octubre	Cwm Hyfryd / Bro Hydref	Beautiful Valley / October Valley
Valle de Los Altares	Dyffryn yr Allorau	Valley of the Altars
Valle de los Mártires	Dyffryn y Merthyron / Rhyd y Beddau	Valley of the Martyrs
Valle inferior del río Chubut	Dyffryn Camwy	Chubut Valley
Valle Frío	Dyffryn Oer	Cold Valley
Vuelta/Prado del río	Dolavon < dôl yr afon	Meadow by the River
