= Gaiman (disambiguation) =

Neil Gaiman is an English author.

Gaiman may also refer to:

== People ==
- David Gaiman, former head of the UK branch of the Church of Scientology

== Places ==
- Gaiman, Chubut, a town in Patagonia, Argentina
  - Gaiman Department

== Other ==
- Gaiman Award, a Japanese award for comics created elsewhere

== See also ==
- Gayman (disambiguation)
- Phil Gaimon, US cyclist
