= Integrated Transport System =

Government agency in Peru

- Sistema Integrado de Transporte
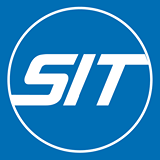

Agency overview
- Formed: June 26, 2012; 12 years ago
- Jurisdiction: Lima metropolitan area
- Parent agency: Urban Transport Authority

The Integrated Transport System for Lima and Callao (Spanish: Sistema Integrado de Transporte de Lima y Callao; SIT) is an urban public transportation system that operates in the Lima metropolitan area, made up of the Peruvian cities of Lima and Callao. Its administration is in charge of the Urban Transport Authority (ATU).

== History ==
Its origins date back to June 2011, when municipal ordinance No. 1538 was issued, which froze the public transportation vehicle registry. With this measure, it was achieved that no other smaller vehicle, van or minibus, was registered for passenger transportation in the Urban Transportation Management (GTU), of the Metropolitan Municipality of Lima.

A year later, in June 2012, the creation of the first SIT was established by municipal ordinance No. 1613. At that time, the focus of the system was the implementation of the current complementary corridors, whose jurisdiction was limited to Lima Province. Many public transportation companies authorized by the GTU formed a consortium to be able to participate in route bidding under the requirements established by Protransporte (currently ATU), the municipal entity in charge of this process.

The implementation of the corridors was not without problems, since several of the routes authorized by the municipality of Callao circulated along Lima avenues and had to be shortened or diverted. Given this, the public demand of the transporters from Callao to the then mayor of Lima Susana Villarán became evident. In 2014, Mayor Villarán announced that the road corridor would be built to begin the transportation reform.

Its definition as such appears for the first time in article 4 of Law No. 30900, promulgated in December 2018. In 2023, only 11 districts of the 43 that make up Metropolitan Lima were connected to the fast bus line known as the Metropolitan Corridor.
