= Complementary corridors =

Transit system in Peru

Corredores complementarios

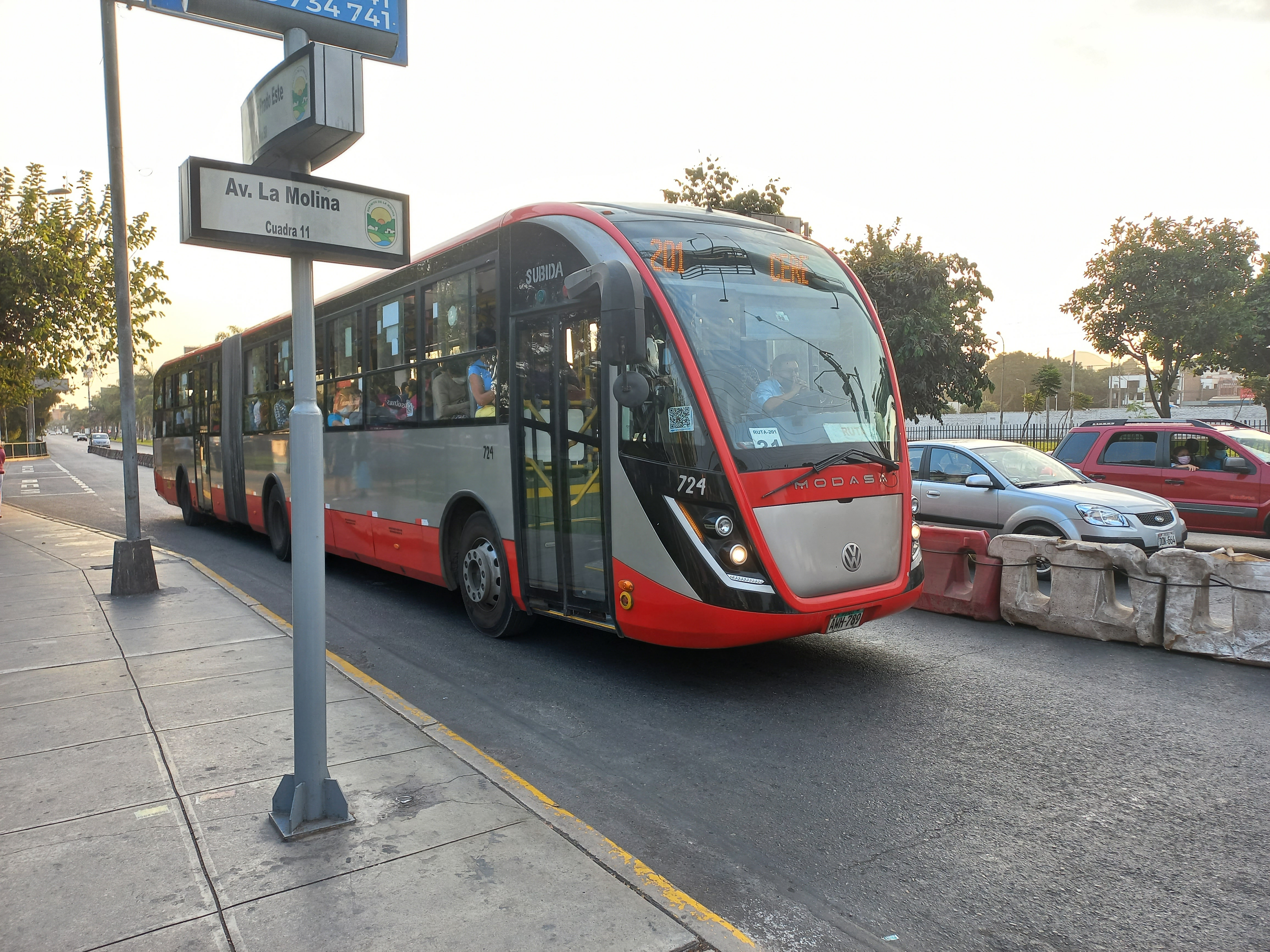
- A bus of the red corridor

Overview
- Owner: Integrated Transport System
- Area served: Lima metropolitan area
- Transit type: Transit bus
- Line number: 10

Operation
- Began operation: 2014
- Operator: Urban Transport Authority
- Number of vehicles: 454 buses

The complementary corridors (Spanish: Corredores complementarios) are a bus transit system that serves the metropolitan area of Lima and Callao. It is a network of bus systems that cover the main avenues of the metropolitan area.

== Structure ==
A "complementary corridor" can be defined as a group of bus services that provide service on the same trunk axis, generally made up of large metropolitan avenues. They supply medium capacity routes on mixed routes and, in theory, complement massive systems such as the metro and the Metropolitano.

While the administration of the system is in charge of the Urban Transport Authority (ATU), the operation falls to private concessionaires. As of 2019, there are 18 services awarded through public bidding to 6 consortia. Likewise, there is a fleet of approximately 800 units, mostly 12-metre buses.

The corridors are differentiated by colour according to mayoral resolution No. 380-2015. Initially five corridors were implemented.

The Lima Pass smart card is used to access the transit system. The card was implemented on the red and blue corridors on April 18 and June 1, 2019, respectively.

== Services ==
The system is run by a number of routes or corridors sorted by colour.

Corridor	Routes	Fleet	Operators
Corredor Rojo Javier Prado - La Marina	201, 204, 206, 209	294 buses 3 articulated	Allin Group - Javier Prado S.A.
Corredor Azul Tacna - Garcilaso - Arequipa	301, 303, 305, 336, 370, 371	125 buses 32 midibuses	Consorcio Transporte Arequipa S.A.

== See also ==
- Metropolitano
- Lima and Callao Metro
- Urban Transport Authority
