= Boca de la Zanja =

Boca de la Zanja may refer to:

- Boca de la Zanja, another name for Boca Toma, a small dam in Argentina
- Boca de la Zanja, a lake in Puerto Rico
