= Gayman =

Gayman is a surname. Notable people with the surname include:

- Dan Gayman, founder of the Church of Israel
- Elesha Gayman, American politician

== See also ==
- Gayman Elementary School, primary school in Pennsylvania
- Gaiman (disambiguation)
- Gay men
