= Metropolitano (Lima) =

Transit system of dedicated bus lanes in the city of Lima, Peru

- Metropolitan Corridor Logo

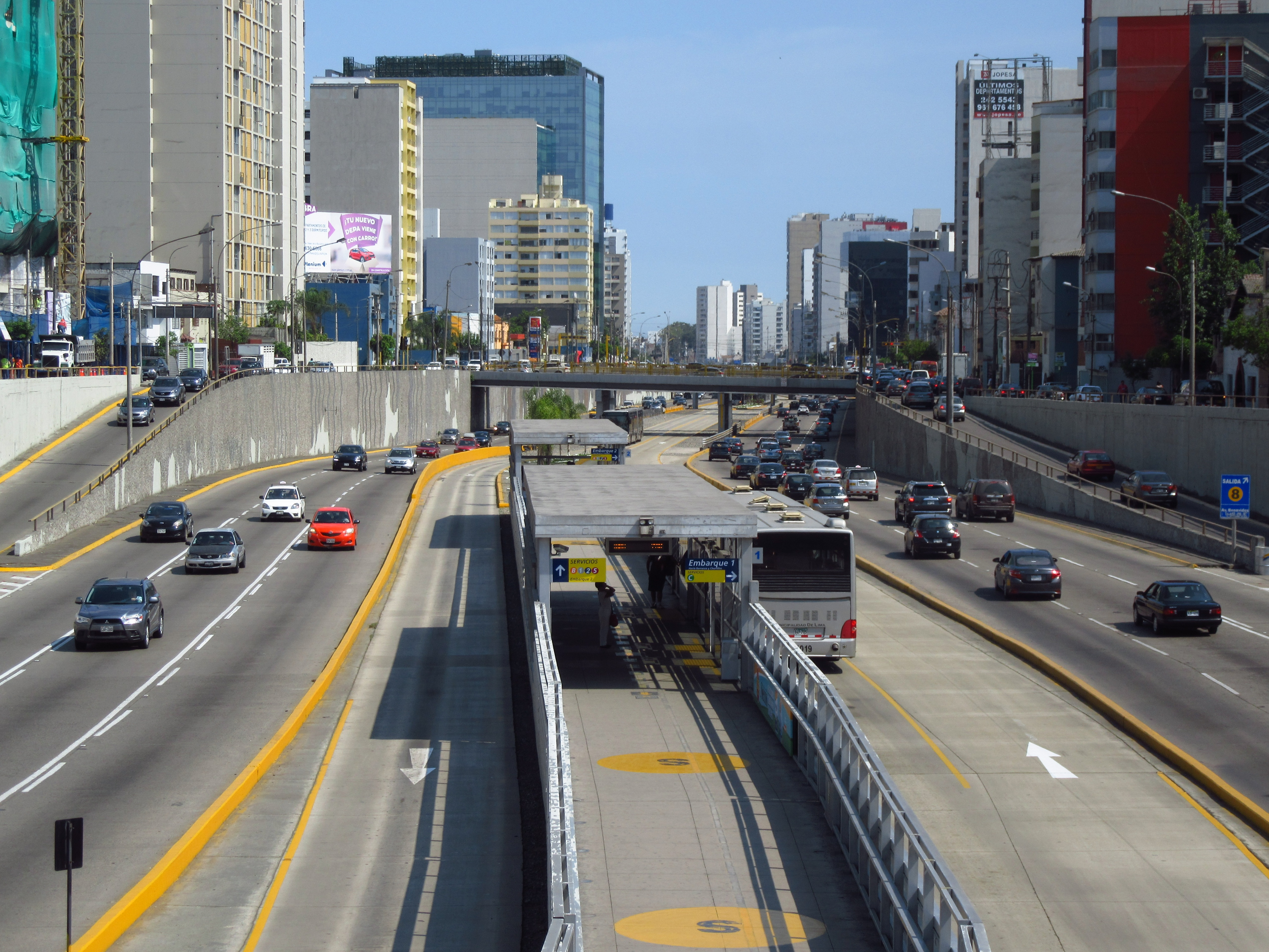

Overview
- Native name: Metropolitan Corridor
- Owner: Urban Transport Authority – MTC (since September 2020); Metropolitan Municipality of Lima (originally)
- Locale: Lima, Peru
- Transit type: bus rapid transit
- Number of lines: 2
- Number of stations: 56 Stations; 44 Stations in operation 12 Stations under construction

Operation
- Began operation: October 2010
- Operators: Perú Masivo S.A. Lima Bus Internacional 1 S.A. Lima Vías Express S.A. Transvial Lima S.A.C.

Technical
- System length: 37.2 km (23 mi)
System map

Metropolitano is a bus rapid transit system serving the city of Lima, Peru. Its construction began in the year 2006.

== History ==
The origins of the Metropolitano go back to the Lima Bus project, which was planned and proposed during the administration of former mayor Alberto Andrade Carmona.

Its construction began in the year 2006 during Luis Castañeda Lossio's first period as Mayor of Lima. Service commenced on July 28, 2010, during his second term.

On March 18, 2019, Lima mayor Jorge Muñoz announced the expansion of the Metropolitano line, consisting of the construction of a 12-kilometer road from Naranjal station, in Independencia, to Chimpu Ocllo avenue, in Carabayllo.

This system is similar to the TransMilenio of Bogotá, and inspired by the previous system that existed in the city the National Urban Transport Company (In spanish: Empresa Nacional de Transporte Urbano-ENATRU), which was the first urban transport system in Peru, that also even inspired other companies such as the Rede Integrada de Transporte (which started the era of BRT).

In September 2020, the Metropolitano begins to be controlled and administered by the Authority for Urban Transport in Lima and Callao, an institution that reports directly to MTC and from the government of Peru, so is no longer administered by the Municipality of Lima.

== Services ==
=== Regular service ===
These routes stop in all stations. "Regular A," "Regular B", "Regular C" and "Regular D" services are included in this category.

==== Regular A ====
This bus route stops in all stations from Estación Naranjal to Estación Central, going through Av. Emancipación and Jr. Lampa in Downtown Lima. Skyblue is used by this bus route as its color.

==== Regular B ====
Currently, this is the only bus route that stops in all stations from Chimpu Ocllo Terminal to Estación Central. Unlike Regular A, it goes through Av. Alfonso Ugarte and Av. España. Orange is used by this bus route as its color.

==== Regular C ====
This bus route begins in Estación Ramón Castilla and finishes in Estación Matellini going through Av. Emancipación and Jr. Lampa in Downtown Lima. Green is used by this bus route as its color.

==== Regular D ====
This bus route begins in Estación Naranjal to Estación Central going through Av. Alfonso Ugarte and Av. Espana. Purple is used by this bus route as its color.

=== Express services ===
There are thirteen plus special Express services which stops only at designated stations.

Express 1

This bus route begins in Estación Central to Estación Matellini. Silver is used by this bus route as its color.

Express 2

This bus route begins Estación Naranjal to Veintiocho de Julio in the north to south direction and from Ricardo Palma station to Estación Naranjal in the south to north direction. Blue is used by this bus route as its color.

Express 3

This bus route begins Estación Naranjal to Veintiocho de Julio in the north to south direction and from Benavides Station to Estación Naranjal in the south to north direction. Golden is used by this bus route as its color.

Express 4 (Inoperative)

This bus route begins Estación Naranjal to Plaza de Flores Station. It ceased to function on April 24, 2024, due to readjustments. The following route is your replacement. Red is used by this bus route as its color.

Express 5

This bus route begins Estación Naranjal to Plaza de Flores Station. Cherry is used by this bus route as its color.

Express 6

This bus route begins Izaguirre Station to Benavides Station only from north to south. Black is used by this bus route as its color.

Express 7

This bus route begins Tomás Valle Station to Angamos Station only from north to south. Garnet is used by this bus route as its color.

Express 8

This bus route begins Izaguirre Station to Plaza de Flores Station. Pink is used by this bus route as its color.

Express 9

This bus route begins UNI Station to Benavides Station in the north to south direction and from Plaza de Flores Station to UNI Station in the south to north direction. Light blue is used by this bus route as its color.

Express 10

This bus route begins from Estación Naranjal to Estación Central, going through Av. Emancipación and Jr. Lampa in Downtown Lima only from north to south. Mint Green is used by this bus route as its color.

Express 11

This bus route begins from Los Incas Station to Estación Central. Dark purple is used by this bus route as its color.

Express 12

This bus route begins from Estación Central to Benavides Station only from north to south. Brown is used by this bus route as its color.

Express 13

This bus route begins from Chimpu Ocllo Terminal to Estación Central. Fuchsia is used by this bus route as its color.

Super Express

This bus route begins Estación Naranjal to Veintiocho de Julio in the north to south direction and from Estación Comunidad Andina – Aramburú to Estación Naranjal in the south to north direction. Light green is used by this bus route as its color.

Super Express North

This bus route begins from Estación Naranjal to Estación Central, going through Av. Alfonso Ugarte and Av. España. Due to the high number of passengers, a new route has been added that departs from the 22 de Agosto Station to Estación Central only from north to south. Yellow is used by this bus route as its color.

"Lechucero" L

This bus route begins from Estación Naranjal to Estación Matellini going through Av. Alfonso Ugarte and Av. España. Grey is used by this bus route as its color.

== Stops ==
STATIONS	SERVICES / EXPRESS	NEIGHBOURHOOD
Northern Portion
**Chimpu Ocllo**	B 13	Carabayllo
San Felipe		Comas
San Carlos		Comas
La Alborada		Comas
Los Incas	B 11 13	Comas
Sangarará		Comas
Jamaica		Comas
Micaela Bastidas		Comas
Andrés Belaunde	B 11 13	Comas
Los Ángeles		Comas
22 de Agosto	B 11 SXN	Comas
José Pagador		Comas
Las Vegas	B 11 SXN	Comas
Universitaria		Comas
Universidad	B 11 SXN	Comas
Maestro Peruano		Comas
Los Platinos		Comas
Santa Ligia		Comas
**Naranjal**	A B D 2 3 5 10 11 SX SXN L	Independencia
Izaguirre	A B D 5 6 8 L	Independencia
Pacífico	A B D 11	Independencia
Independencia	A B D 6 8	Independencia
Jazmines	A B D 5 6 7 8 L	Independencia
Tomás Valle	A B D	San Martín de Porres and Independencia
El Milagro	A B D	San Martín de Porres and Independencia
Honorio Delgado	A B D	San Martín de Porres and Independencia
UNI	A B D 5 7 8 9 13 L	Rímac and San Martín de Porres
Parque del Trabajo	A B D	Rímac and San Martín de Porres
Caquetá	A B D 5 8 9 10	Rímac and San Martín de Porres
Central Portion – Start of the bifurcation
BRANCH LINE Alfonso Ugarte – España
Dos de Mayo	B D SXN	Lima
Quilca	B D SXN	Lima and Breña
España	B D 5 9 SXN	Lima and Breña
BRANCH LINE Emancipación – Lampa
Ramón Castilla	A C 10	Lima
Jr. de la Unión	A C 10	Lima
Tacna	A C 10	Lima
Colmena	A C 10	Lima
Central Portion – End of the bifurcation
**E. Central**	A B C D 1 5 6 7 8 9 10 11 12 13 SXN	Lima
Southern Portion
Estadio Nacional	C 1 12	La Victoria and Lima
México	C	La Victoria and Lima
Canadá	C 2 5 9 L	La Victoria and Lince
Javier Prado	C 1 2 5 6 7 8 9 12	San Isidro
Canaval y Moreyra	C 1 5 6 7 8 9 12 SX	San Isidro
Comunidad Andina-Aramburú	C SX	San Isidro
Domingo Orué	C	Miraflores and Surquillo
Angamos	C 1 3 5 6 7 8 12 SX L	Miraflores and Surquillo
Ricardo Palma	C 2 5 L	Miraflores and Surquillo
Benavides	C 3 6 8 9 12 SX	Miraflores
28 de Julio	C 1 2 SX	Miraflores
Plaza de Flores	C 5 8 9	Barranco
Balta	C 1 L	Barranco
Bulevar	C L	Barranco
Estadio Unión	C 1	Barranco
Escuela Militar	C	Chorrillos
Fernando Terán	C 1	Chorrillos
Rosario de Villa	C	Chorrillos
**Matellini**	C 1 L	Chorrillos

*bold indicates Express stops

=== Naranjal ===
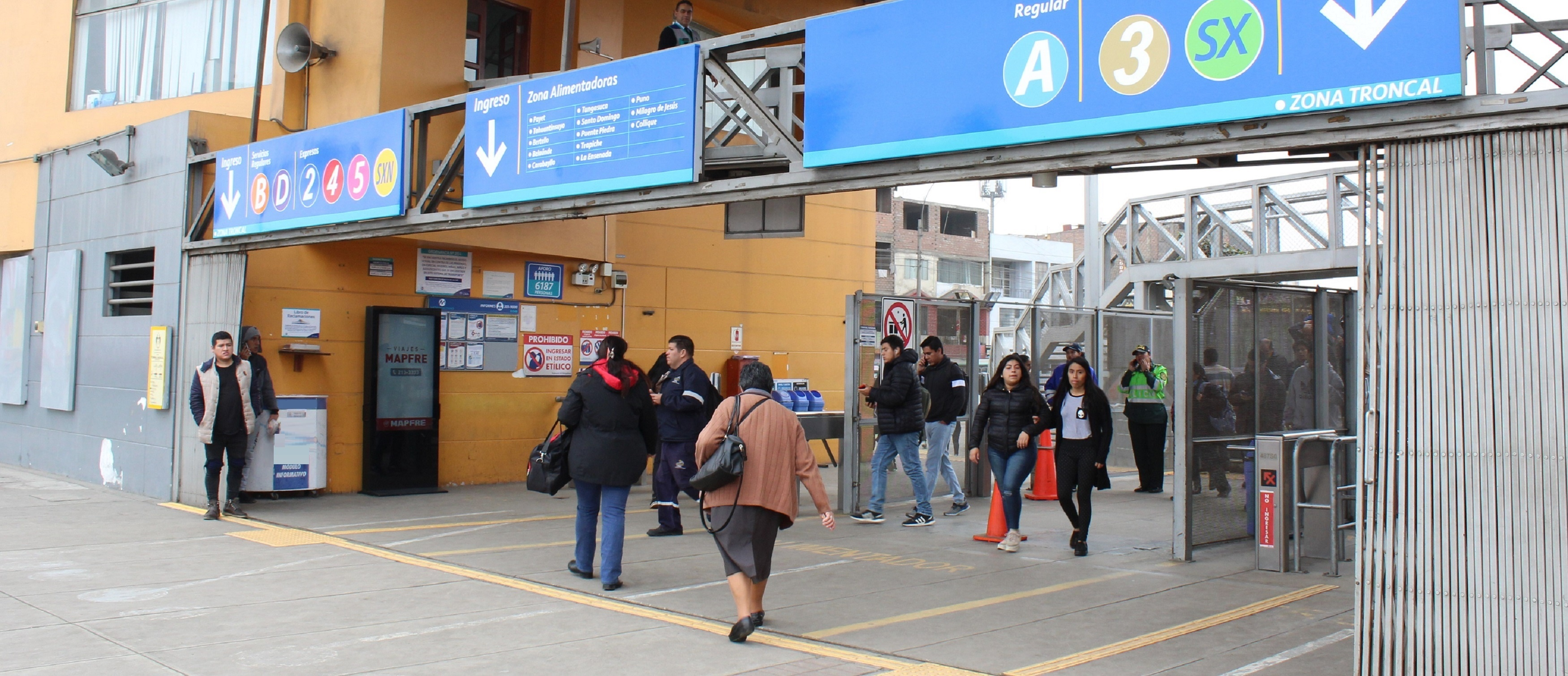
Terminal Naranjal

Terminal Naranjal is located in a disputed area of the district of Independencia, is the northern end of the line for the system and its busiest station. The name of the terminal (as well as its adjacent avenue and roundabout) comes from its location, a former sugarcane mill located on the site of an hacienda of the same name in lands owned by Conquistadors Francisco de Ampuero and Nicolás de Ribera since 1732.

=== Ramón Castilla ===
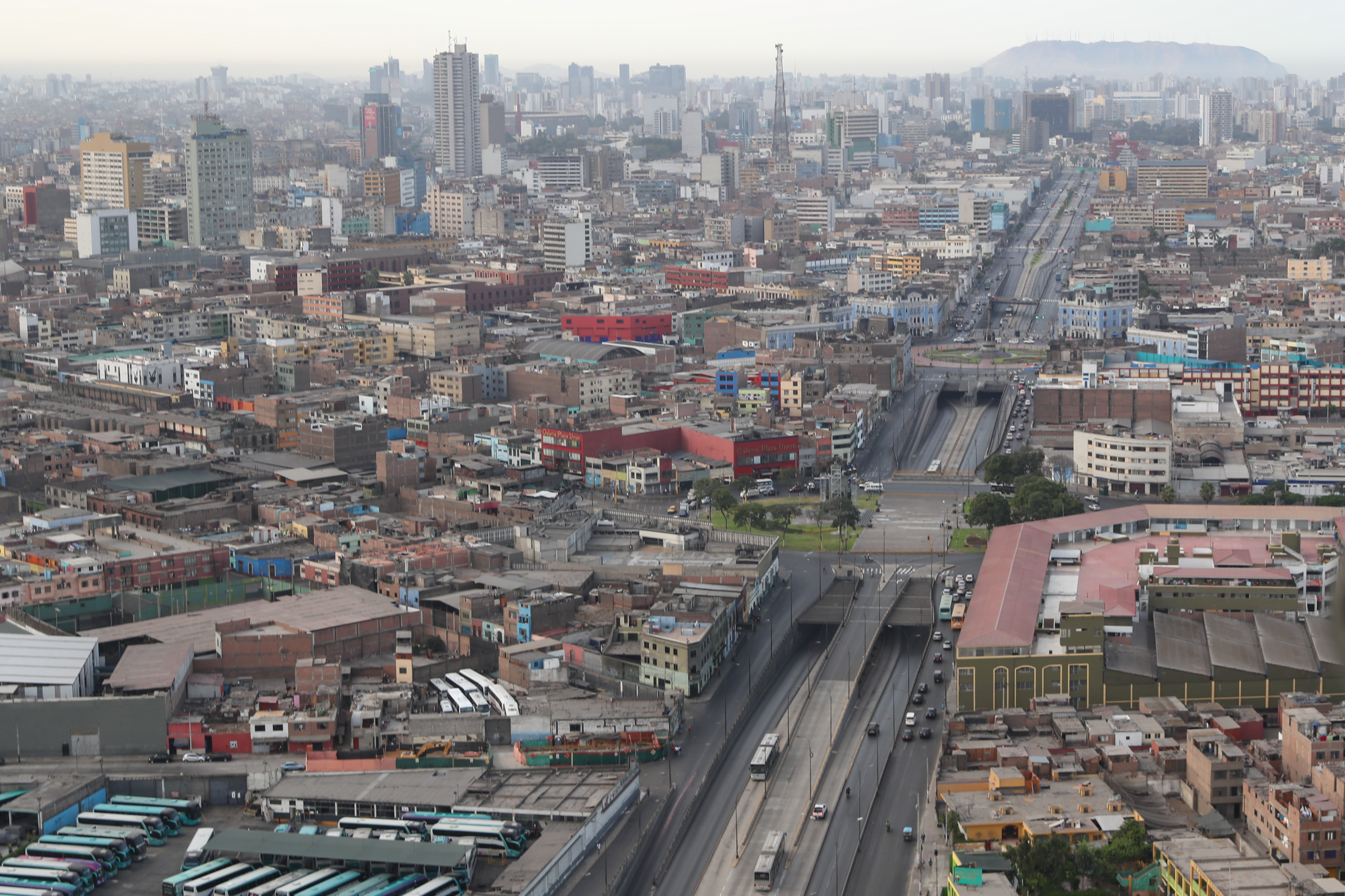
Aerial view of the plaza and the station

Ramón Castilla station is located at the intersection of Avenida Emancipación and Plaza Ramón Castilla.

=== Tacna ===
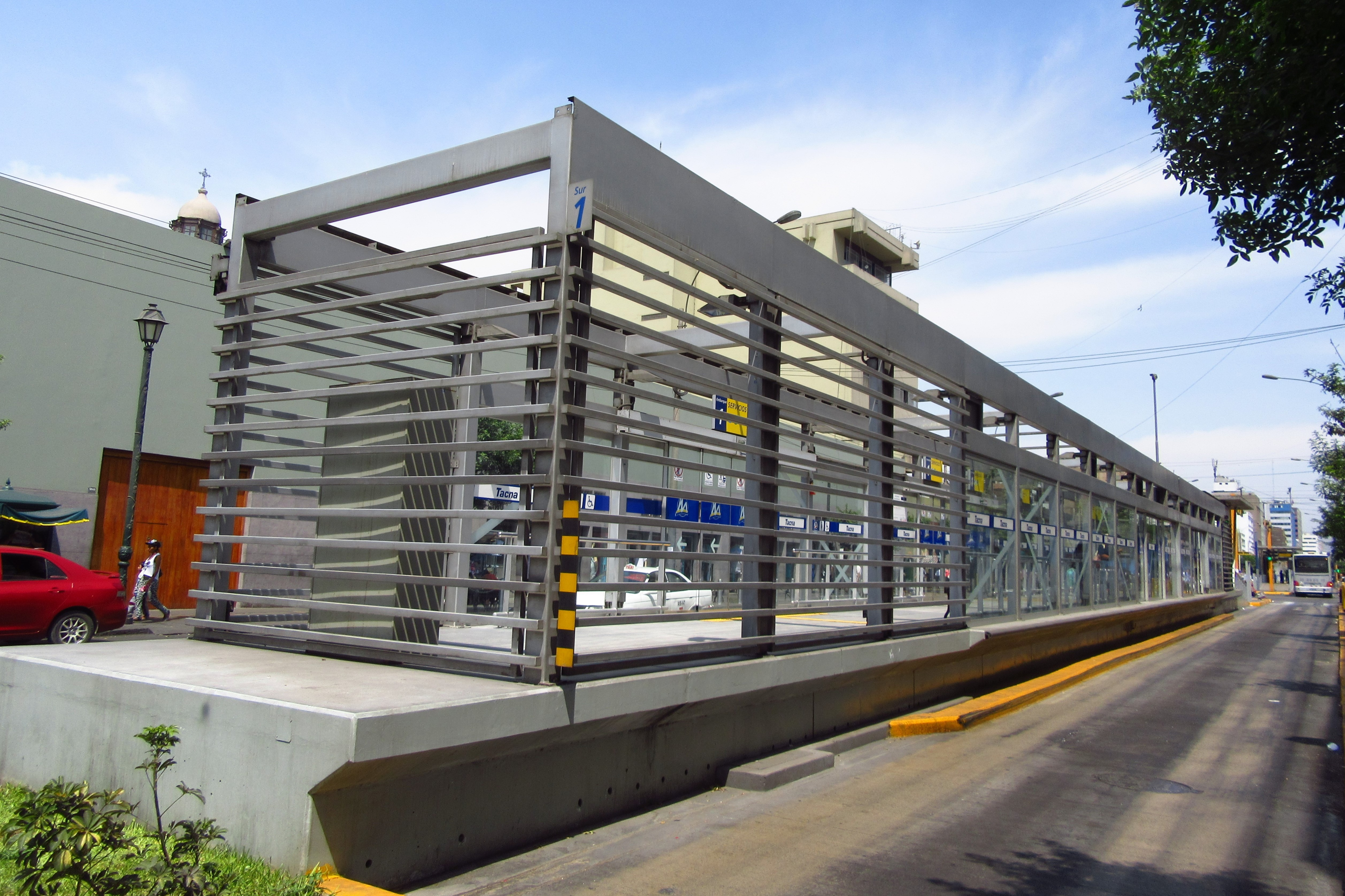
Tacna

Tacna station is located at the intersection of Emancipación and Tacna avenues in the city's historic centre. Due to its proximity to the Sanctuary and Monastery of Las Nazarenas, its service is suspended when the annual Lord of Miracles festivities start in October.

=== Colmena ===
Colmena is a station located at the intersection of Nicolás de Piérola Avenue and Jirón Lampa, next to Democracy Square. The station was damaged during the protests of 2020 and 2022.

=== Estación Central ===
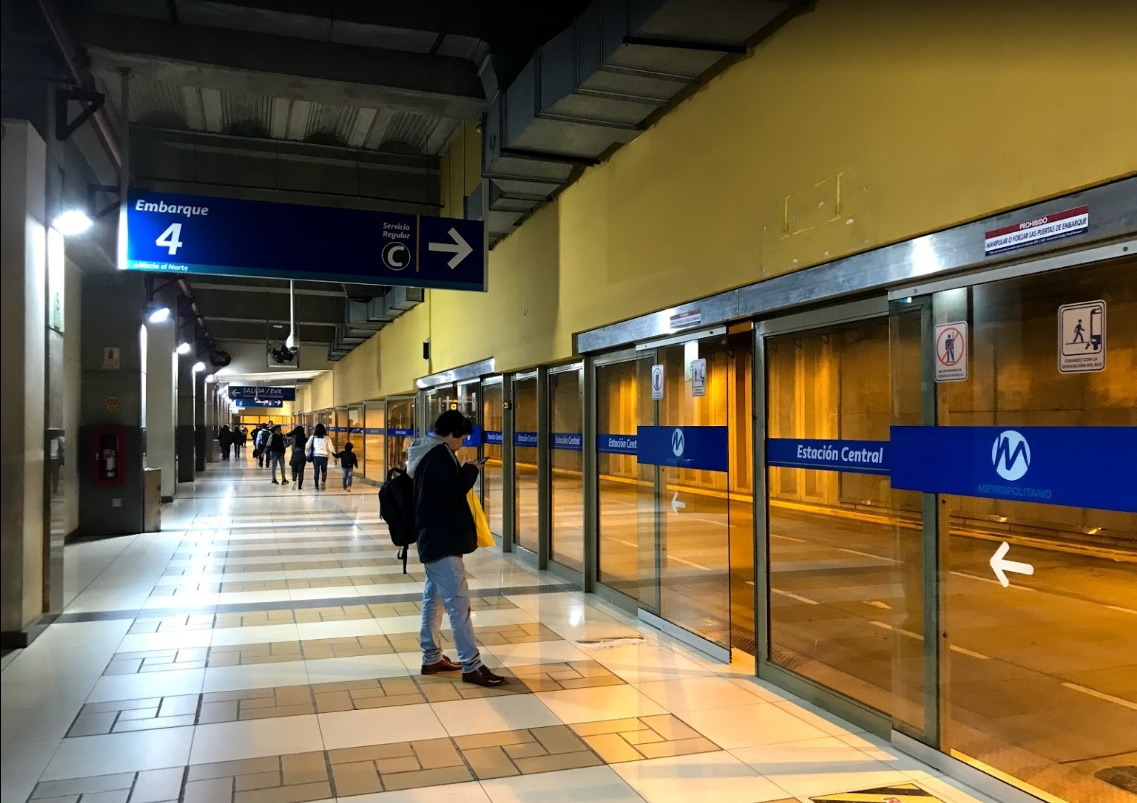
Estación Central

Estación Central (Spanish for "Central station") is the station located under the Paseo de los Héroes Navales, between the Plaza Grau and Bolivia/Roosevelt avenues, where the system path's bifurcation begins. Construction of the station began on July 16, 2007. In 2008 the construction of the tunnels that replace the mixed pedestrian zone was carried out.

As part of the construction of Lima Metro Line 2, the construction of a station of the same name for the metro's route is scheduled to join the Metropolitano's station, making it an intermodal station, the first of its kind in the city. Construction works for the station will take place under the Paseo Colón.

=== Estadio Nacional ===
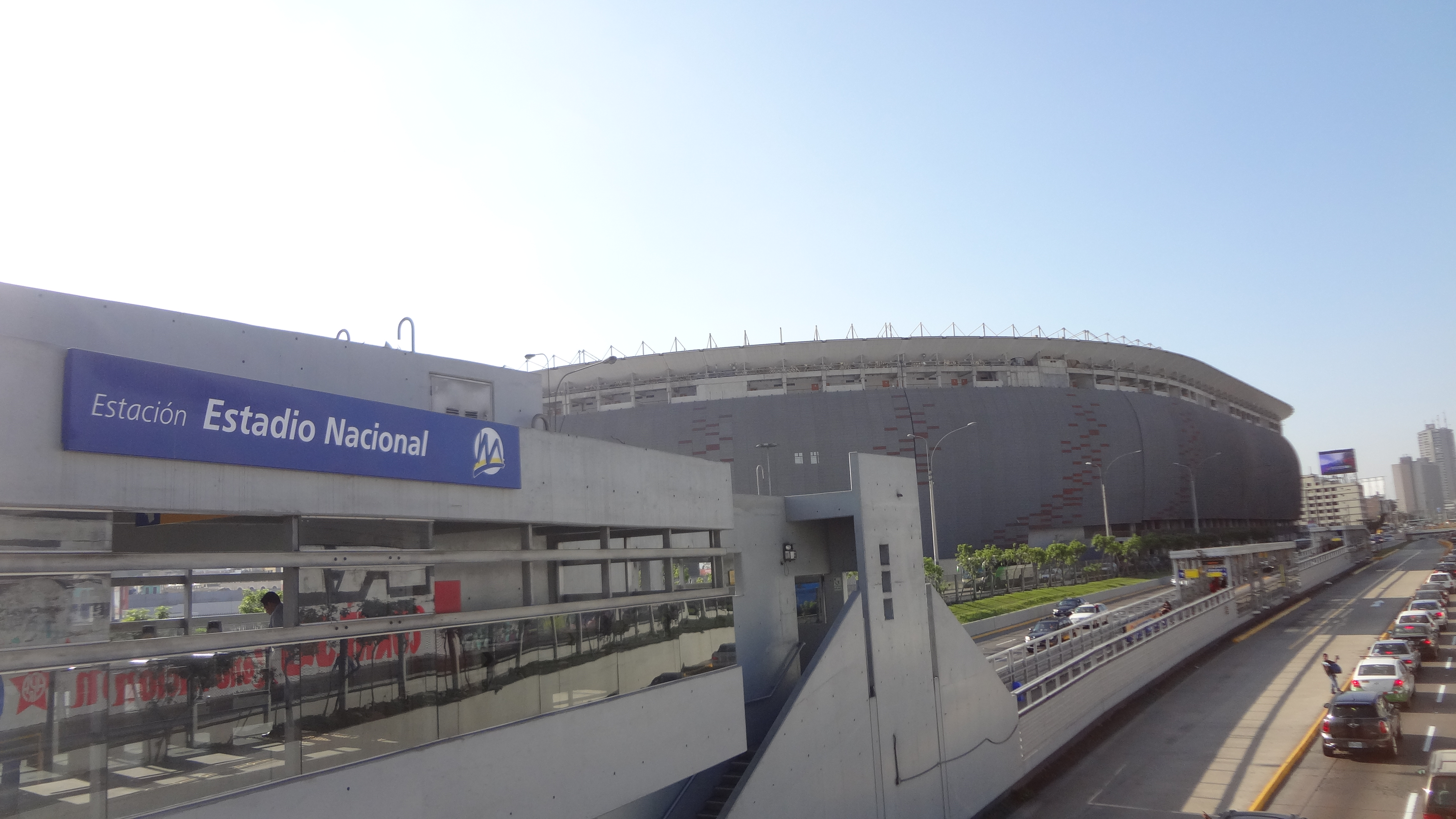
Estadio Nacional

Estadio Nacional (Spanish for "National Stadium") station located east of the National Stadium of Peru and the Park of the Reserve, receiving its name from the former, between the districts of La Victoria and Lima's Santa Beatriz neighbourhood. Due to its proximity to the stadium, its schedules are often modified to fit those of the events that take place there, such as the Peruvian Clásico or a number of international football matches, as well as concerts.

=== Javier Prado ===
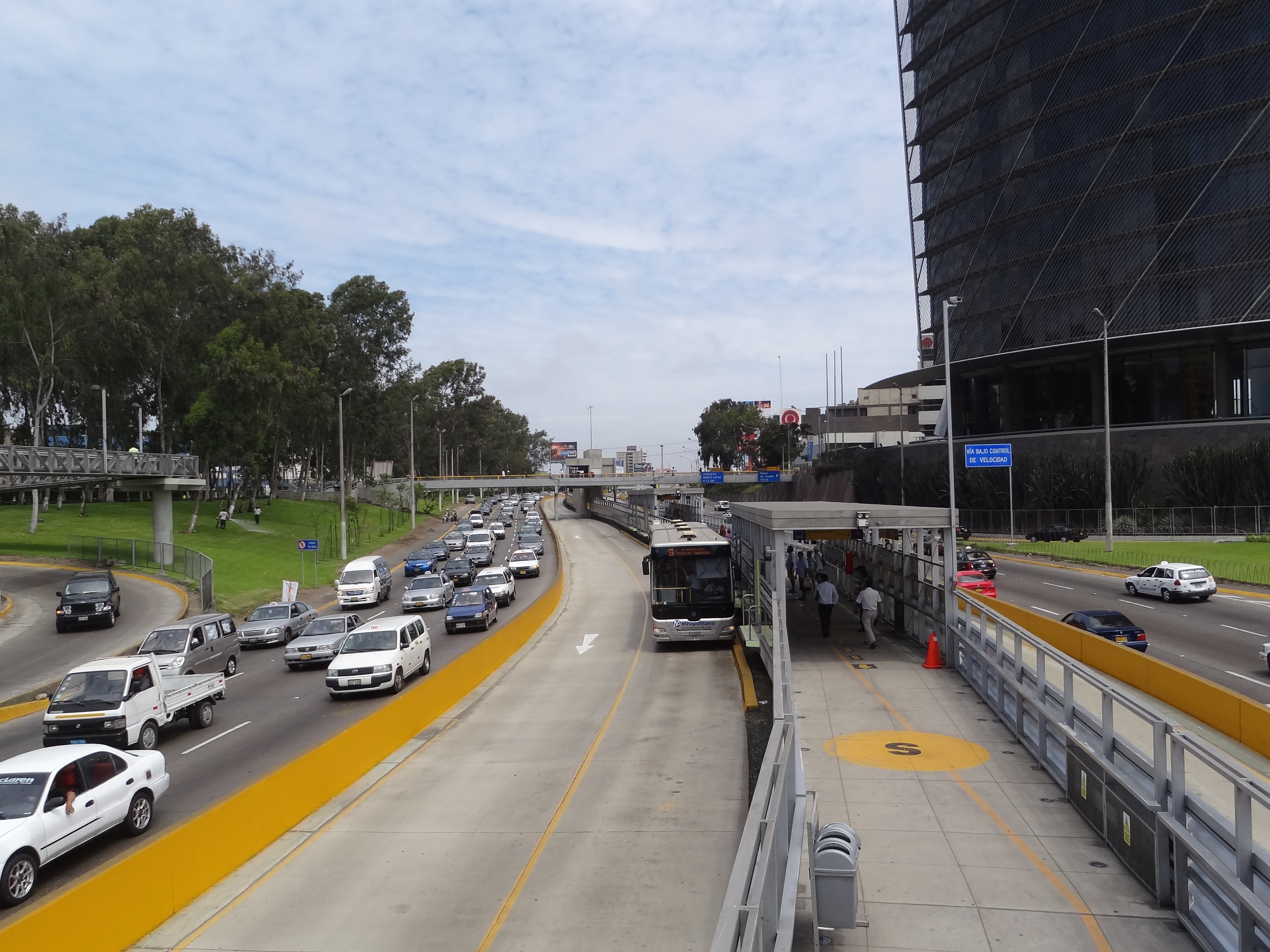
Modern Lima

Javier Prado is a station located near the city's financial district, next to the headquarters of Interbank in the neighbourhood of Santa Catalina, Lima.

=== Andrés Reyes ===
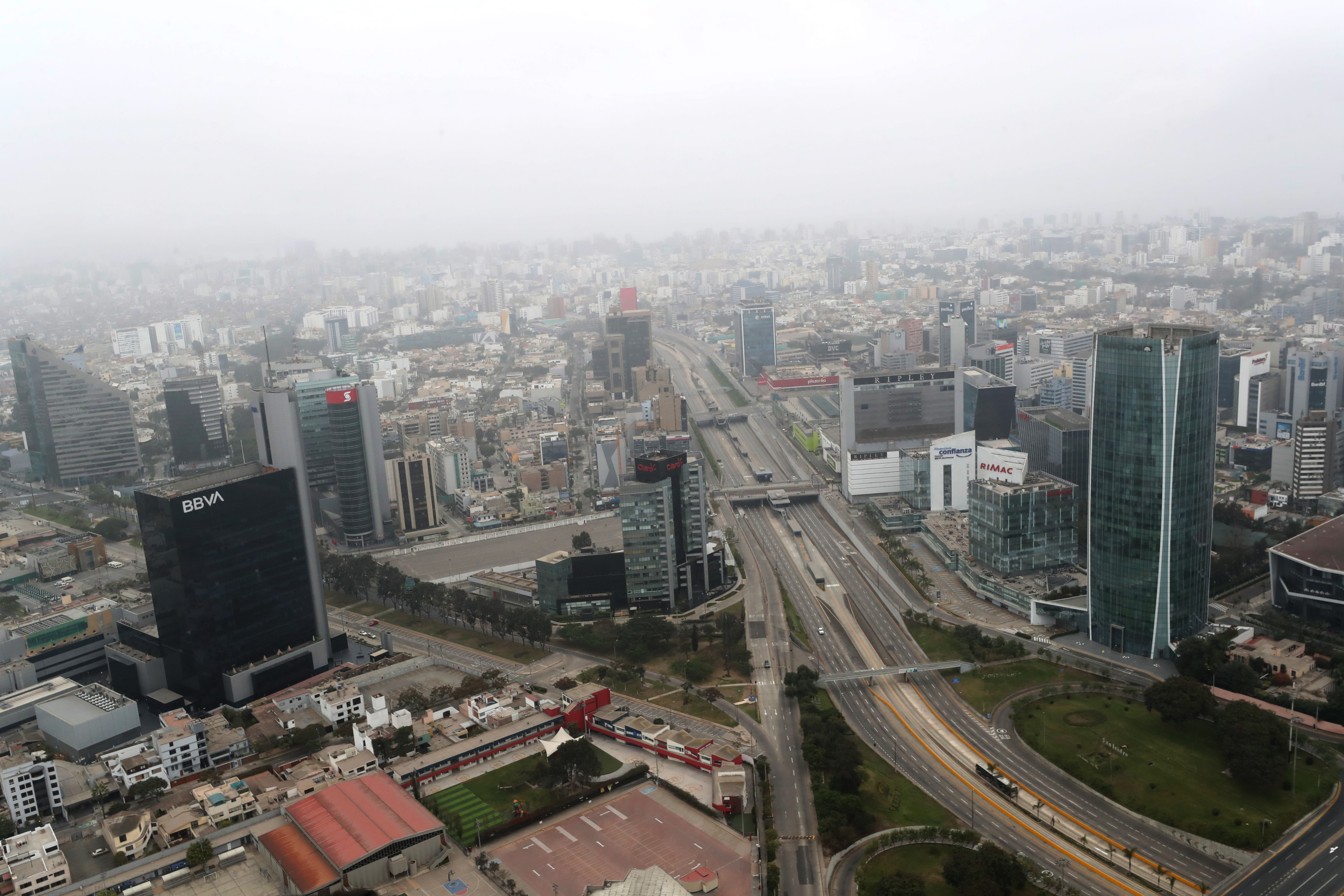
Andrés Reyes

Andrés Reyes is a station located at the intersection of Paseo de la República and jirón Andrés Reyes in San Isidro District. The station was built to alleviate the load taken by neighbouring Canaval y Moreyra and Javier Prado stations. Construction began in 2018, continuing well into 2019 with a cost of S/. 1 million. It was inaugurated by Jorge Muñoz Wells, then Mayor of Lima, on February 21, 2020.

=== Canaval y Moreyra ===
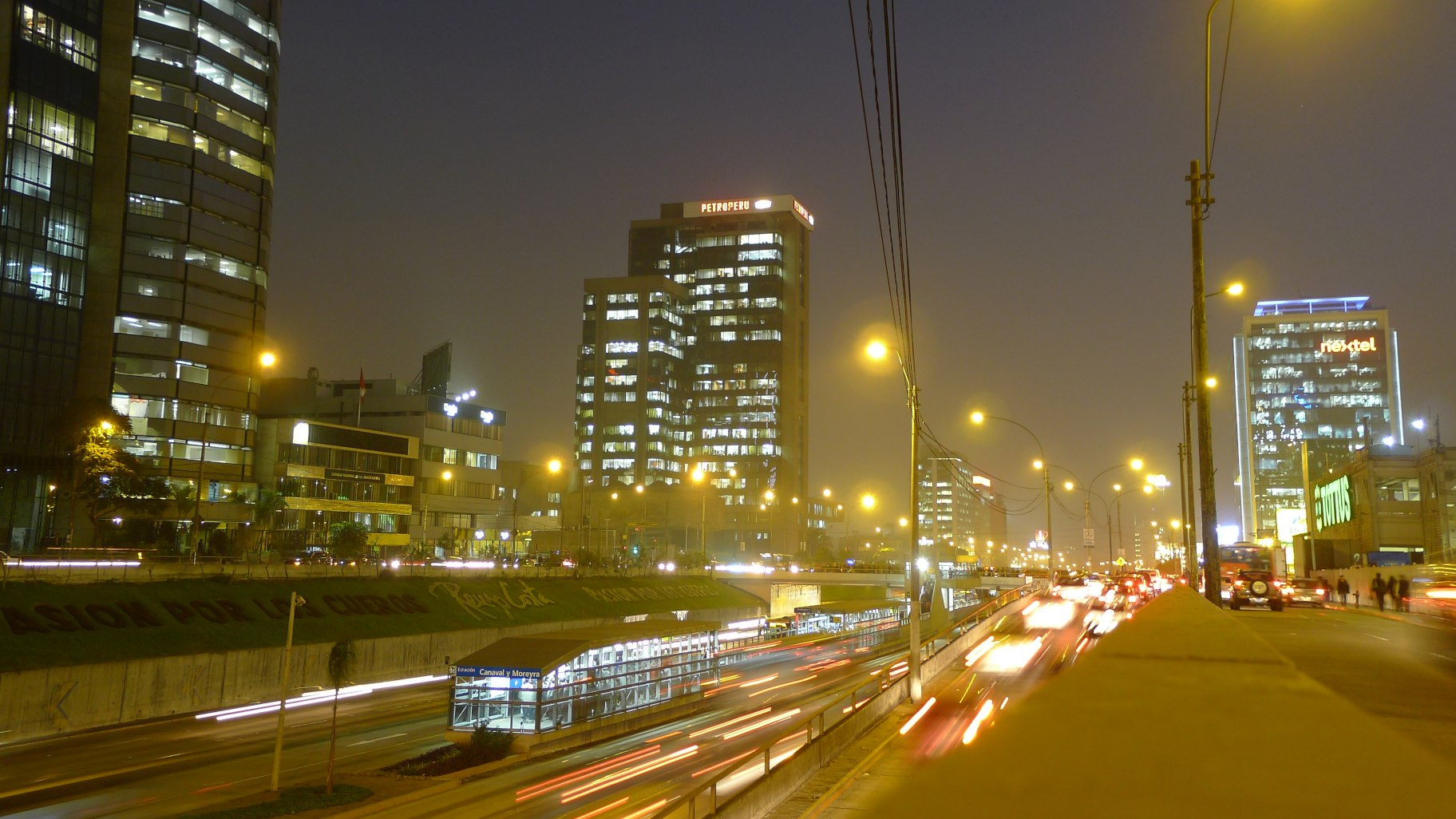
Lima-Peru Buildings

Canaval y Moreyra is a station located at the intersection of Paseo de la República with the avenue of the same name in San Isidro District, Lima. It is located in the financial centre of the city, near buildings such as those of Petroperú and of the Ministry of Development. The station services over 16,000 people daily. In addition to its main access, another one exists at Andrés Reyes street.

=== Comunidad Andina-Aramburú ===
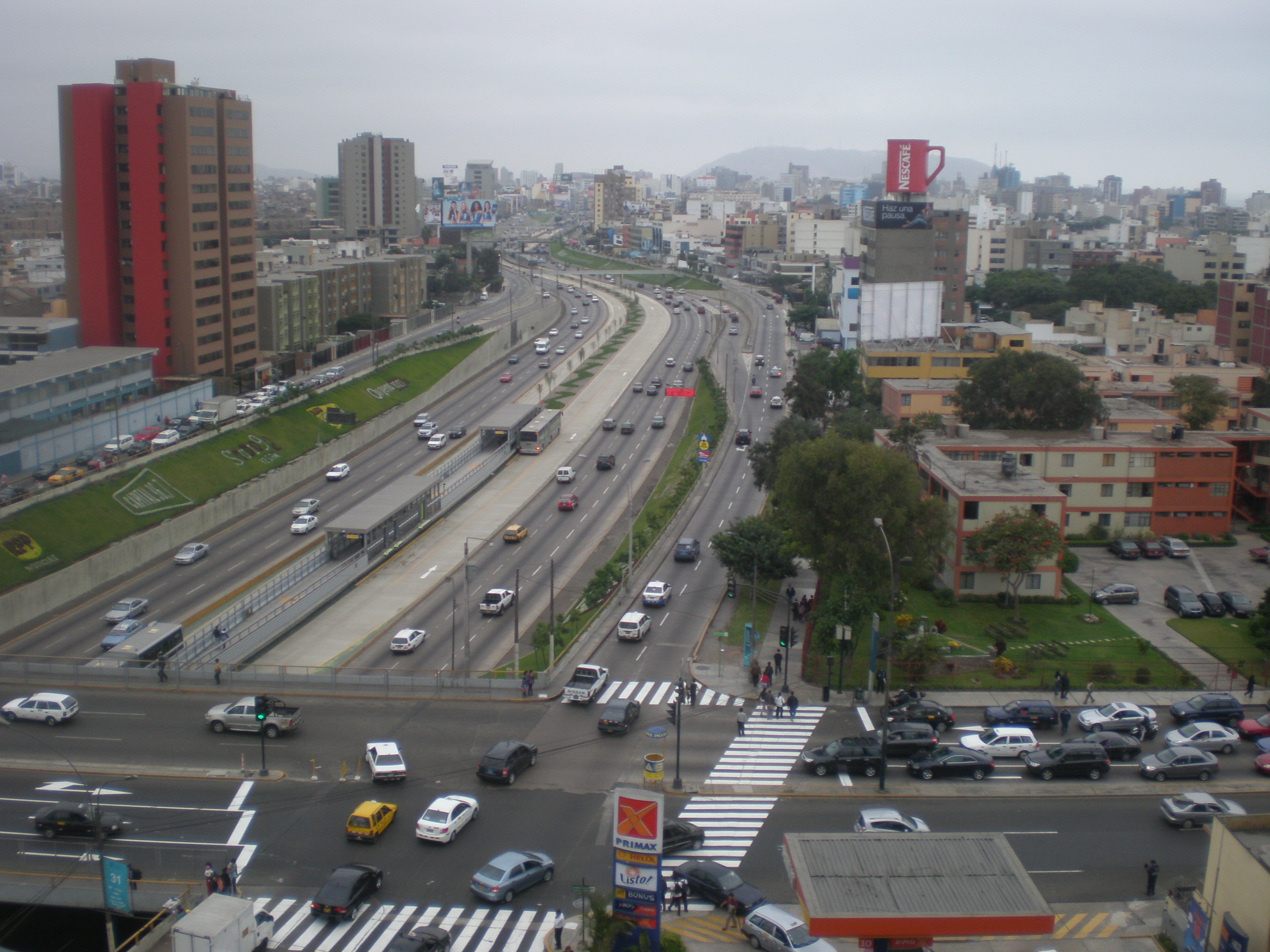
Via expresa hacia el sur – panoramio

Comunidad Andina-Aramburú, formerly known as Aramburú, is a station located at the intersection of Paseo de la República and Andrés Aramburú Avenue, next to the Headquarters of the Andean Community. It received its current name in 2023 after a successful proposal by the Ministry of Foreign Affairs.

=== Matellini ===
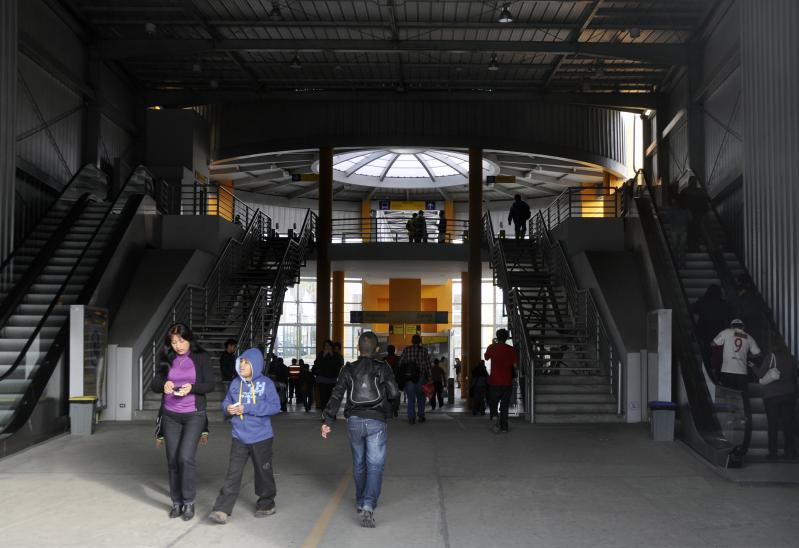
Terminal Matellini

Terminal Matellini, also known as Estación Terminal Sur, is the southern terminal of the bus system and is located in Chorrillos District.

== Payment ==
Fares are paid through an Electronic Prepaid Card which can be purchased and refilled at any station in the system. There is a flat fee of S/. 3.50 (3.50 soles, approximately US$0.89) for regular commuters. This originally was S/. 1.50, but was raised in December 2012 to S/. 2.00, got raised again so that by February 2015 (or earlier) it became S/. 2.50. And in 2022 it got raised again to S/. 3.50. The card can be bought at a vending machine, which is available on every station, and will cost S/. 4.50. It can be charged up to S/. 100.00. The machines accept both coins and bills, but payment with bank cards (either debit or credit) is not possible.

There are separate Electronic Prepaid Cards available for students, either university or normal schools. These can only be obtained through a sales office, and bear a name. These are charged a lower rate, but can be recharged at the same vending machines. Firefighters and police are not required to pay and do not have to possess any of these cards.

== Buses ==
The buses are powered by natural gas, purchased from Chinese manufacturers King Long and Bonluck. These articulated buses are 18 to 19 metres (59 to 62 ft) long and can carry up to 120 passengers. The system uses about 300 of these gray-colored buses.

Smaller buses are used as feeders to each of the main stations (Naranjal, Estacion Central and Matellini). Those painted yellow can carry up to 80 passengers, while orange ones can only carry 40.

== See also ==
- Lima Metro
- List of bus rapid transit systems
