= ENATRU =

Peruvian urban transport company

ENATRU PERÚ S.A.
- Empresa Nacional del Transporte Urbano del Perú
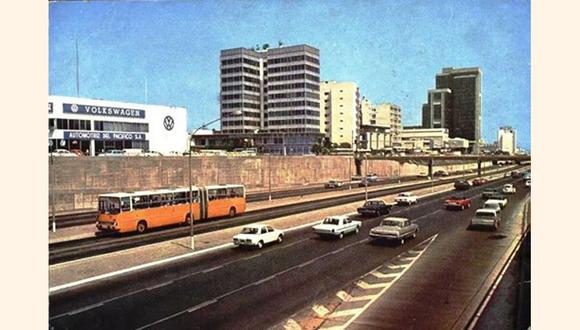
- An ENATRU bus drives down the Paseo de la República in the 1976
- Formation: 1975
- Dissolved: 1992
- Region served: Peru
- Services: Public transport
- Owner: Peruvian State

The National Urban Transport Company of Peru (Spanish: Empresa Nacional del Transporte Urbano del Perú), better known by its initials, ENATRU, was a state company in charge of urban transport in different departments of Peru established under the country's left-wing military government. It existed between 1975 and 1992.

The company was known for its mustard-coloured Ikarus buses, which were imported from the Hungarian People's Republic on the orders of then mayor of Lima Eduardo Dibós Chappuis. It also owned Büssing buses, originally meant to be used by the company's ill-fated predecessor, the Paramunicipal Transport Association (APTL).

The company's financial troubles began with the country's economic crisis of the 1980s, which worsened due to subversive groups attacking the company's buses due to it being the only one of its type that did not suspend its services at the time. The company was consequently privatized in 1992 and the buses were sold to its employees.

== See also ==
- Metropolitano (Lima)
