= 28 de Julio =

28 de Julio Tir Halen
- Municipality and village
- Interactive map of 28 de Julio
- Coordinates: 43.37°S 65.80°W
- Country: Argentina
- Province: Chubut Province
- Department: Gaiman Department

Government
  - Intendant: Luka Jones (PJ)

Population (2001 INDEC)
  - Total: 491
- Time zone: UTC−3 (ART)
- Postcode: H9107
- Area code: 02965
- Climate: BWk

28 de Julio (Veintiocho de Julio, also called simply Veintiocho) (Welsh: Tir Halen) is a village and municipality in Gaiman Department, Chubut Province in southern Argentina, and is west of the lower Chubut River. To its east is Dolavon, to its north is National Route 25, to its south is a boundary, and to its west is Boca Toma. The economy in the village is primarily agricultural.
