= Dolavon =

Dolavon Dolafon
- Town
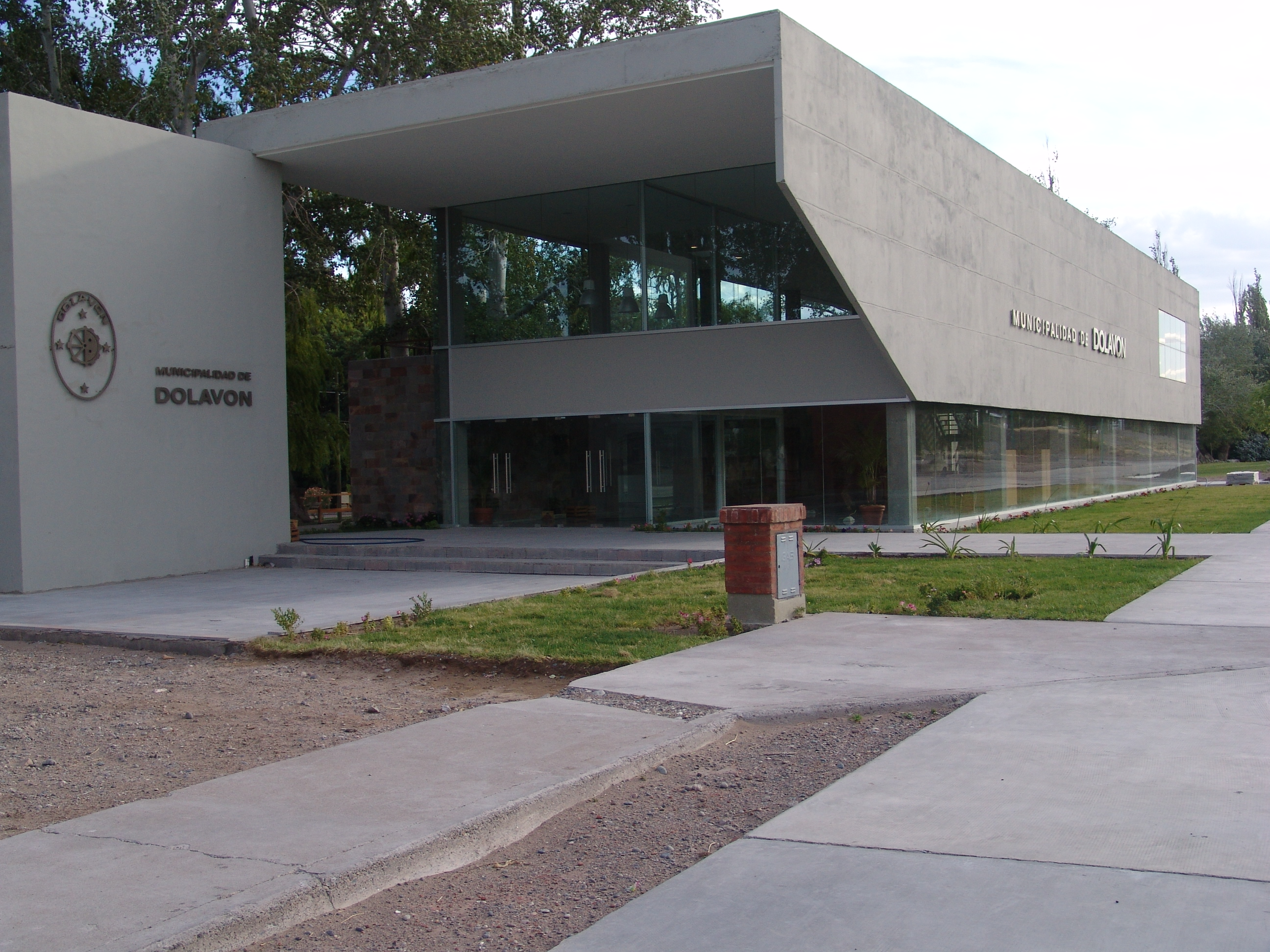
- Municipal building

- Flag

- Location of Dolavon in Argentina
- Coordinates: 43°18′S 65°42′W
- Country: Argentina
- Province: Chubut
- Department: Gaiman

Government
  - Intendant: Dante Bowen
- Elevation: 27 m (89 ft)

Population
  - Total: 2,929
- Time zone: UTC−3 (ART)
- CPA base: U9107
- Dialing code: +54 2965
- Climate: BWk

Dolavon (Welsh: Dolafon) is a small town in the Patagonian province of Chubut, Argentina. It had a population of 2,929 according to the 2001 census [INDEC]. It is located close to the Chubut River, about 19 km (12 mi) to the west of Gaiman. The name comes from Welsh dôl (meadow) and afon (river). Welsh immigrants began to settle in the area after their arrival in Patagonia in 1865. The Central Chubut Railway arrived in 1915, linking the settlement to Trelew, and the town was officially founded in 1919. Dolavon became a centre of wheat production using irrigation canals to compensate for the arid climate. The old flour mill with its water wheel is now a museum.

According to plans announced in November 2006, Dolavon was to be the site of important energy generation facilities by mid-2008: a combined cycle power plant (with an output of between 330 and 465 MW) and a wind farm (100 MW).
