= Urban Transport Authority =

Government agency in Peru

- Autoridad de Transporte Urbano

Agency overview
- Formed: December 27, 2018; 7 years ago
- Preceding agencies: Urban Transportation Management (GTU); Urban Transportation General Management (GGTU)
- Jurisdiction: Lima metropolitan area
- Headquarters: Miraflores District, Lima
- Agency executives: Minister, Raúl Pérez-Reyes; President of the Directive Council, José Aguilar Reátegui
- Parent agency: Ministry of Transport and Communications

The Urban Transport Authority for Lima and Callao (Spanish: Autoridad de Transporte Urbano para Lima y Callao; ATU) is a specialised technical organisation of the Ministry of Transportation and Communications. Its main function is to integrate and articulate urban public transportation in the Lima metropolitan area.

Organised transport systems such as the Lima Metro and the Metropolitano are dependent on the ATU.

== History ==
Since the late 2000s, various candidates for mayor of Lima proposed the creation of an autonomous transportation authority that would replace the Urban Transportation Management and complement the Autonomous Authority of the Electric Train (AATE) that at that time was part of the Municipality of Lima, until, in 2009, by ordinance issued during the second APRA government, the AATE once again became part of the Ministry of Transport and Communications. The purpose of the planned authority was the supervision and integration of urban transportation in Lima Province and that could then have an agreement with the municipality of Callao so that it also integrates the authority and thus avoids conflicts during the integration of transportation in the Lima metropolitan area. Previously, there was the Technical Secretariat of the Transportation Council of Lima and Callao that ensured the integration of transportation and the creation of new lines that were promoted by the Japanese Agency JICA in agreement with the Peruvian government. In 2010, during the mandate of Lima mayor Luis Castañeda Lossio, the first High-Capacity Segregated Corridor was inaugurated, called Metropolitano, after which the ordinance of routes that overlapped its route began.

During the mandate of Susana Villarán (2011-2014), a transportation reform was carried out that indicated the renewal of buses using the Bus Patrón as an example, scrapping, the cutting and changing of some routes, the promotion of transfers, the whereabouts ordinance and ended with the establishment of the first complementary corridor that began the Integrated Transportation System, but initially had conflict with the municipality of Callao. Previously in her electoral campaign in 2010, Villarán as well as other mayoral candidates promoted the creation of an Autonomous Transportation Authority. Likewise, the project to create an ATU continued under various candidates for the 2014 election.

Later in the message to the nation in 2017, President Pedro Pablo Kuczynski indicated that he would send a bill for the creation of the Autonomous Urban Transportation Authority for Lima and Callao that would depend on the central government through the Ministry of Transportation and Communications.

After the debate in December 2018, Law No. 30900 is promulgated, creating the Urban Transportation Authority for Lima and Callao. Subsequently, the urban transportation institutions in the metropolitan area (AATE, Lima Urban Transportation Management, Callao General Urban Transportation Management, Protransporte, SETAME, SETACA, SIT) are absorbed by the authority that was implemented, the last incorporation was Protransporte in September 2020.

During the debates for the 2022 Lima municipal elections, there was some criticism of the institution, due to some situations that slowed down urban transportation works in Lima, in addition to some candidates professing that the institution took away the powers that the municipality previously managed.

In 2023, the organisation proposed a transportation reform in Lima and Callao, but it was interrupted after the retirement of Ana Jara by the central government. In addition, at the end of that year, operations began on the northern expansion of the Metropolitano and a section of Line 2 of the Lima Metro.

== See also ==
- Lima metropolitan area
- Municipality of Lima
