= Boca Toma Weir =

Coordinates: 43.4423°S 65.9407°W

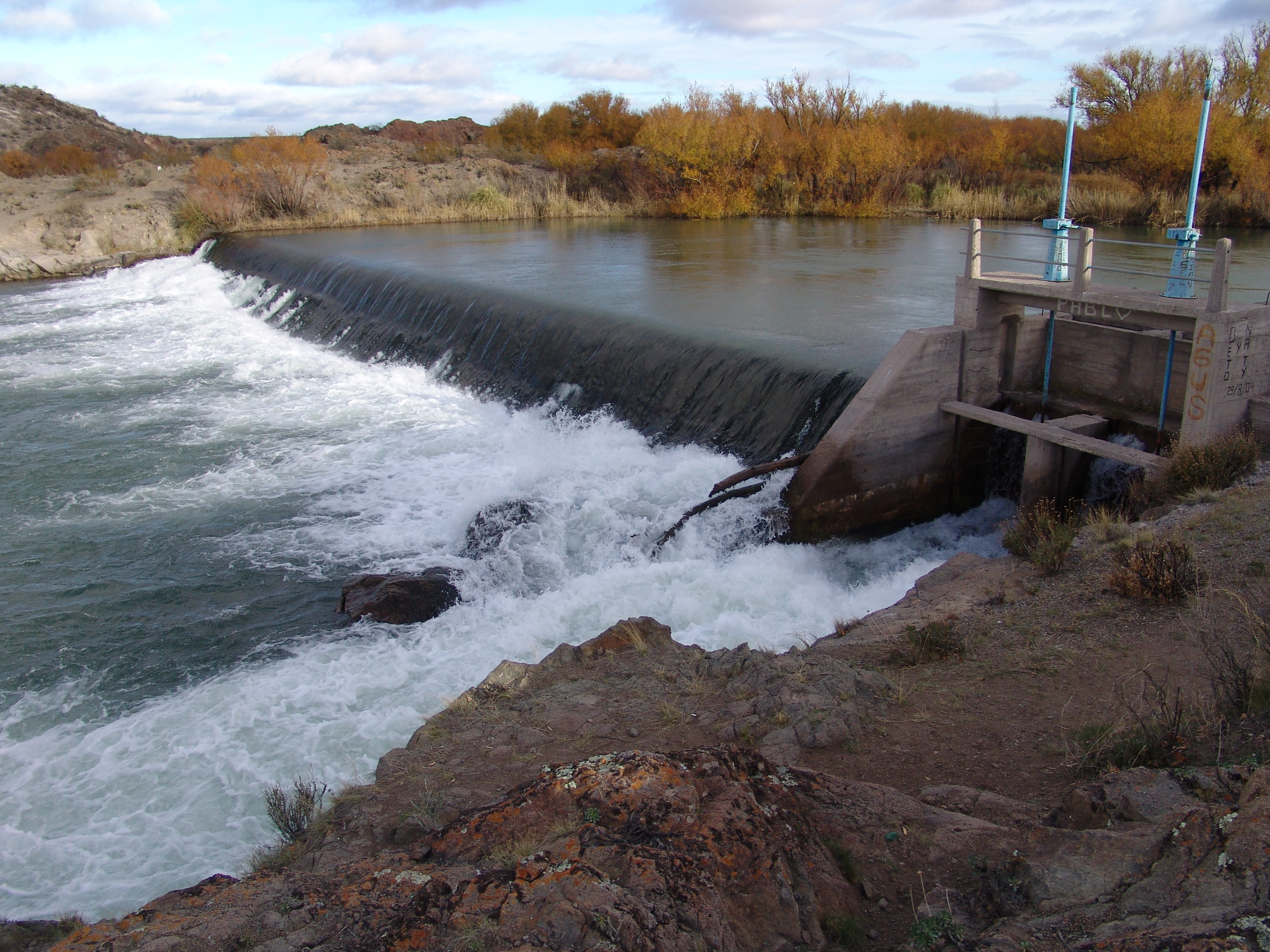
Boca Toma Weir, 2007

Boca Toma, also called Boca de la Zanja, is a small weir on the Chubut River in Chubut Province, Argentina completed in 1919. It is a wall that causes a steep drop in the river, allowing water to be diverted into irrigation canals. Because the area has very low rainfall, this dam allows irrigation in the river valley. The Boca Toma is located a few kilometers downstream from Dique Florentino Ameghino in Gaiman Department.
