= Gaiman Department =

Department of Chubut Province, Argentina

- Departamento Gaiman
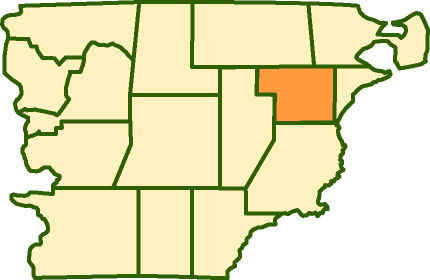
- Coordinates: 43°16′S 65°28′W
- Country: Argentina
- Province: Chubut
- Capital: Gaiman

Area
  - Total: 11,076 km^{2} (4,276 sq mi)

Population (2001)
  - Total: 9,612
  - Density: 0.9/km^{2} (2/sq mi)
- Post Code: U9105
- Website: https://web.archive.org/web/20071029001734/http://www.gaiman.gov.ar/

Gaiman Department is a department of Chubut Province in Argentina.

The provincial subdivision has a population of about 9,612 inhabitants in an area of 11,076 km^{2}, and its capital city is Gaiman, which is located around 1,398 km from the Capital federal.

== Settlements ==
- Villa Dique Florentino Ameghino
- Dolavon
- Gaiman
- Las Chapas
- Bryn Gwyn
- 28 de Julio
