= Gaiman, Chubut =

Town in Argentina

Gaiman
- Town
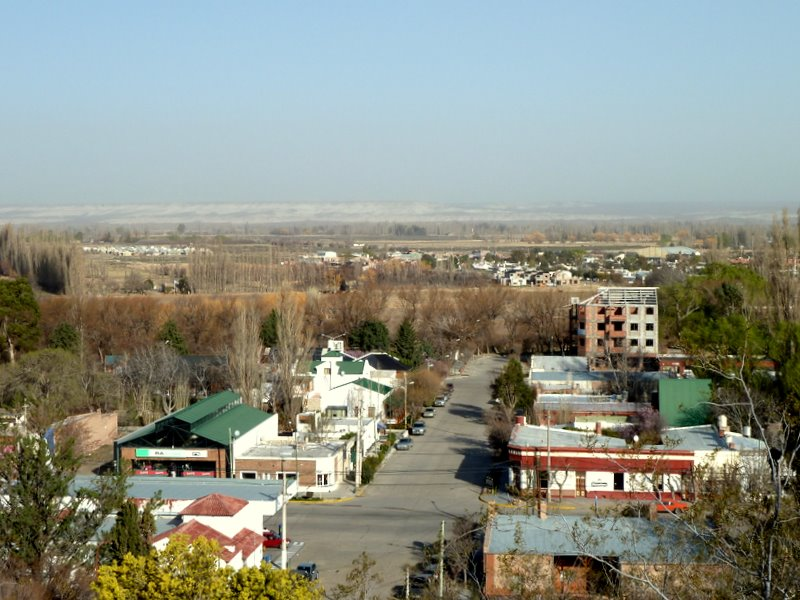

- Location of Gaiman in Argentina
- Coordinates: 43°17′S 65°29′W
- Country: Argentina
- Province: Chubut
- Department: Gaiman
- Established: 1874
- Founded by: David D. Roberts

Government
  - Intendant: Raúl Ferrero (Radical Civic Union)
- Elevation: 27 m (89 ft)

Population
  - Total: 6,627
- Time zone: UTC−3 (ART)
- CPA base: U9105
- Dialing code: +54 280
- Climate: BWk

Gaiman is a town in the Chubut Province of Patagonia in Argentina. It has a population of 6,627 as per the 2010 census [INDEC]. It is located in the River Chubut's lower valley (called Dyffryn Camwy in Welsh), about 15 kilometres (9 mi) west of Trelew. Gaiman is a cultural and demographic centre of the main region of the Welsh settlement in Argentina, known in Welsh as Y Wladfa Gymreig.

The town was founded in 1874 by David D. Roberts and acquired municipal rights in 1885. The Central Chubut Railway arrived in 1908 connecting Gaiman to Trelew. The Gaiman Train Tunnel was built in 1914, when the railway extended to Las Plumas (Welsh: Dôl y Plu).

Many people in the region have maintained the use of Welsh alongside Spanish. The annual youth Eisteddfod, a Welsh cultural festival, is held every September. The Museo Histórico Regional (Regional Historical Museum) in the former station house commemorates the history of the Welsh community in the region. The town is also known for its multiple teahouses, which maintain a traditional Welsh tea ritual and offer Welsh cakes. There are a number of Welsh Protestant chapels, of which the largest is Capel Bethel.

The town's name originates in an indigenous Tehuelche place-name meaning "rocky point or whetstone." Just 10 km (6 mi) to the south of Gaiman is the Bryn Gwyn Paleontological Park.

== Gallery ==
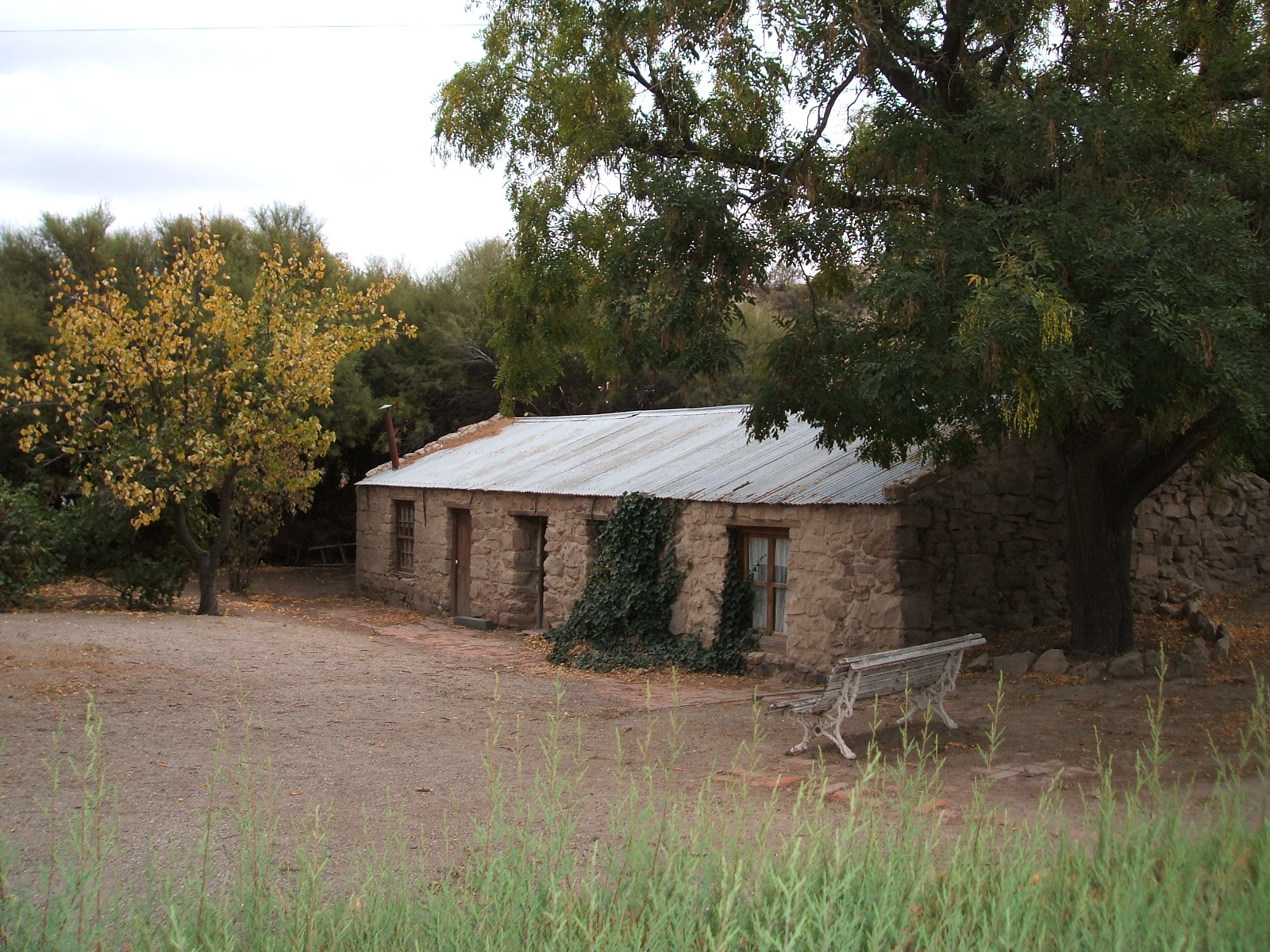
First House (Y tŷ cyntaf)

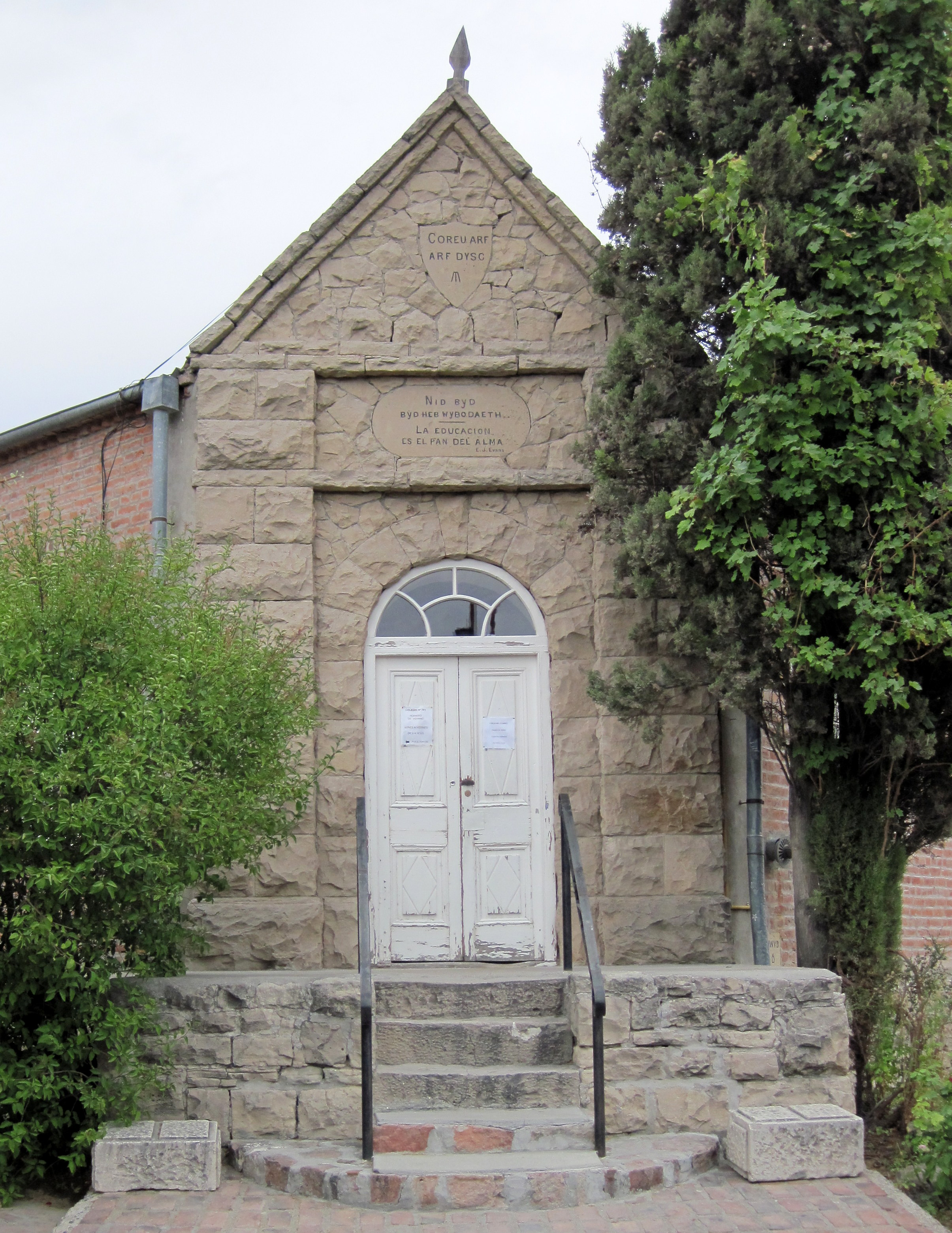
Welsh school, shares motto with Aberystwyth University

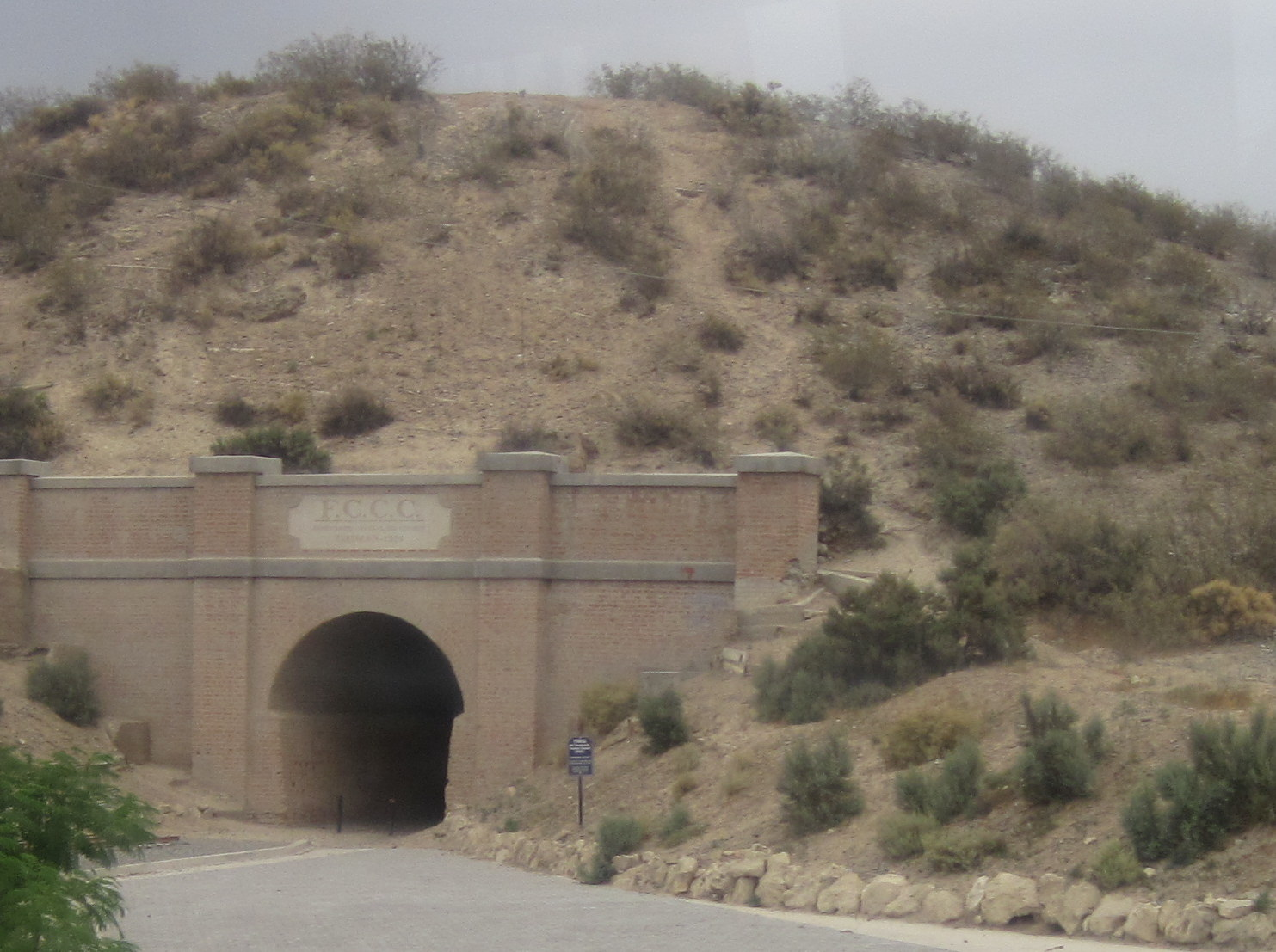
Old train tunnel entrance

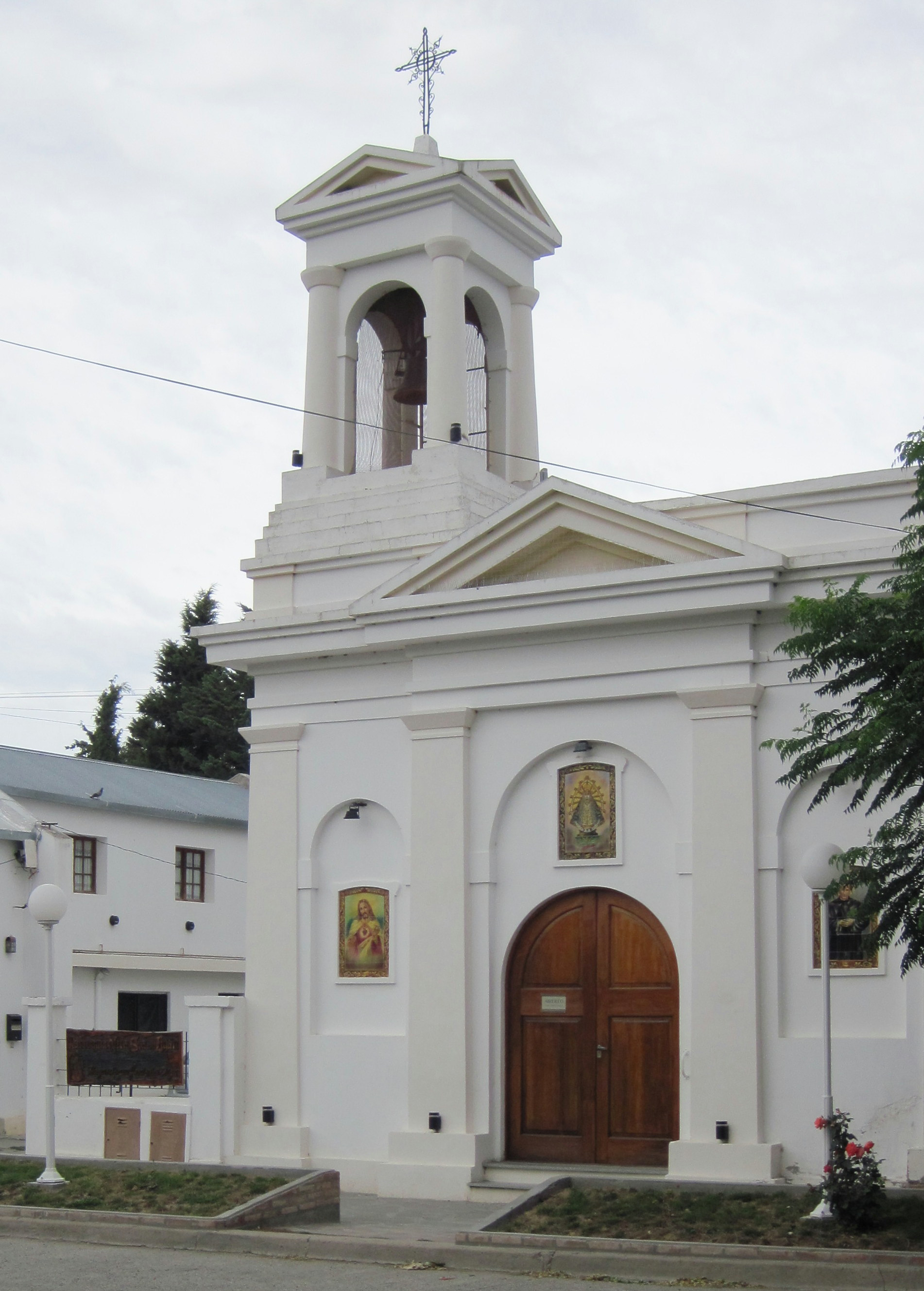
Roman church
