= Cardiff (disambiguation) =

Cardiff is the capital and largest city of Wales.

Cardiff may also refer to:

== Places ==
=== Australia ===
- Cardiff, New South Wales, a suburb of Lake Macquarie
- Cardiff, Western Australia, a locality of the Shire of Collie

=== Canada ===
- Cardiff, Ontario
- Cardiff, Alberta

=== New Zealand ===
- Cardiff, New Zealand, a rural settlement in Taranaki

=== United Kingdom ===
- District of Cardiff, a defunct local government area (1974–1996)
- Cardiff (UK Parliament constituency) (1542–1918)

=== United States ===
- Cardiff, Alabama, a small town
- Cardiff-by-the-Sea, Encinitas, California
- Cardiff, Illinois, a ghost town
- Cardiff, Maryland
- Cardiff, New Jersey
- Cardiff, New York, a hamlet
- Cardiff, Tennessee, a former company town

== Ships ==
- HMS Cardiff (D58), a C-class light cruiser launched in 1917
- HMS Cardiff (D108), a Type-42 destroyer launched in 1974

== Sports teams in Wales ==
- Cardiff Blues, rugby union
- Cardiff City F.C., association football
- Cardiff Demons, rugby league
- Cardiff Devils, ice hockey

== Other uses ==
- Cardiff (surname), list of people so named
- Cardiff English, dialect spoken in Wales
- Cardiff University, Wales
- "Cardiff", a song by Stone Sour from Come What(ever) May
- Cardiff Giant, an archaeological hoax

== See also ==
- Cardiff Central (disambiguation)
- Cardiff City (disambiguation)
- Cardiff North (disambiguation)
- Cardiff South (disambiguation)
- Cardiff South East (UK Parliament constituency)
- Cardiff West (disambiguation)
- HMS Cardiff, a list of ships
