= List of place names of Welsh origin in the United States =

This is a list of places in the United States named for places in Wales.

== Bangor ==
Places named after Bangor, Gwynedd:

- Bangor, Alabama
- Bangor, Maine
- Bangor, New York
- Bangorville, Ohio
- Bangor, Pennsylvania
- Bangor Base, Washington
- Bangor, Wisconsin
- Bangor, Michigan

== Cambria ==
Places named after Cambria:

- Cambria Township, Blue Earth County, Minnesota
- Cambria Township, Cambria County, Pennsylvania
- Cambria, Illinois
- Cambria, Indiana
- Cambria, Iowa
- Cambria, New York
- Cambria, Pennsylvania
- Cambria, Wisconsin
- Northern Cambria, Pennsylvania

== Cardiff ==
Places named after Cardiff:

- Cardiff, Alabama
- Cardiff, Illinois
- Cardiff, Maryland
- Cardiff, New York
- Cardiff-by-the-Sea, Encinitas, California

== Monmouth ==
Places named after Monmouth:

- Monmouth, California
- Monmouth, Illinois
- Monmouth, Indiana
- Monmouth, Iowa
- Monmouth, Kansas
- Monmouth, Maine
- Monmouth County, New Jersey
- Monmouth Junction, New Jersey
- Monmouth, Oregon

== Swansea ==
Places named after Swansea:

- Swansea, Arizona
- Swansea, California
- Swansea, Illinois
- Swansea, Massachusetts
- Swansea, Nevada
- Swansea, South Carolina
- Swanzey, New Hampshire
- East Swanzey, New Hampshire
- West Swanzey, New Hampshire
- Swanzy, Michigan

== Wales ==
Places named Wales:

- North Wales, Pennsylvania
- Wales, Minnesota
- Wales, Utah
- Wales, Alaska
- Wales, Wisconsin

== Other ==
- Bala, Kansas
- Bala Cynwyd, Pennsylvania (named for two places: Bala, Gwynedd and Cynwyd, Denbighshire)
- Berwyn, Pennsylvania
- Brecknock Township, Lancaster County, Pennsylvania
- Bryn Mawr, Pennsylvania
- Caernarvon Township, Lancaster County, Pennsylvania
- Crum Lynne, Pennsylvania
- Cumru, Pennsylvania
- Haverford, Pennsylvania
- Haverford Township, Pennsylvania
- Hawarden, Iowa
- Llanerch, Pennsylvania
- Lower Gwynedd Township, Montgomery County, Pennsylvania
- Lower Merion Township, Montgomery County, Pennsylvania
- Merion, Pennsylvania
- Narberth, Pennsylvania
- North Pembroke, Massachusetts
- Pembrey, Delaware
- Pembroke Pines, Florida
- Pembroke, Massachusetts
- Penllyn, Pennsylvania
- Pennsylvania
- Radnor, Pennsylvania
- St Asaph (Church), Pennsylvania
- St Davids, Pennsylvania
- Tredyffrin Township, Pennsylvania
- Upper Gwynedd Township, Pennsylvania
- Upper Merion Township, Montgomery County, Pennsylvania
- Uwchlan Township, Pennsylvania

== See also ==
- List of non-US places that have a US place named after them
- Locations in the United States with a Welsh name
