= Welsh Americans =

Americans of Welsh birth or descent

Americanwyr Cymreig (Welsh)
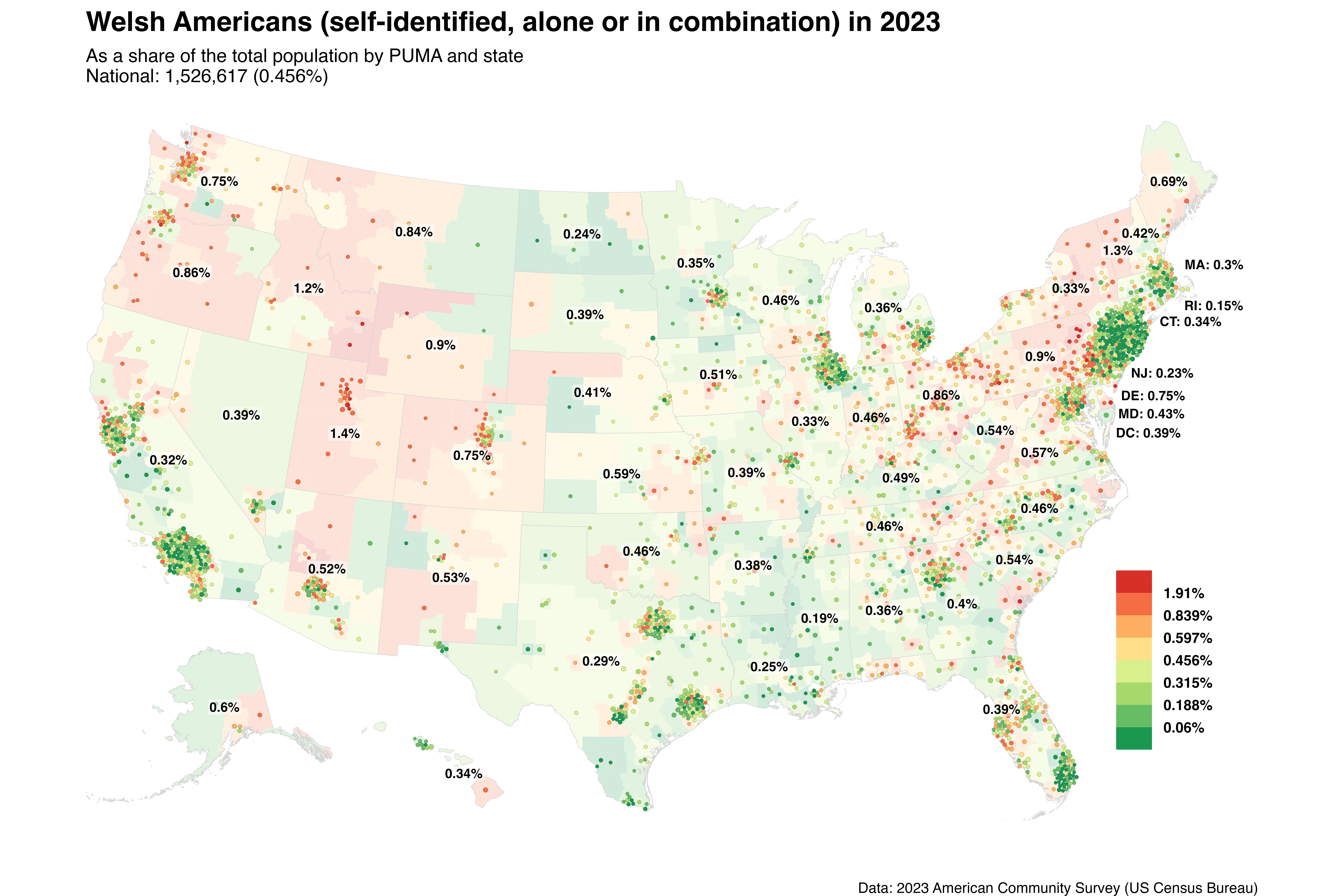

Total population
- 1,977,383 alone or in any combination; 276,199 alone 2020 Census

Regions with significant populations
- New England; New York; Massachusetts; Pennsylvania; New Jersey; Connecticut; Rhode Island; Vermont; New Hampshire; Maine; Ohio; Michigan; Illinois; Wisconsin; Delaware; Maryland; Virginia; Washington, D.C.; Kentucky; Georgia; Florida; Alabama; Tennessee; Missouri; Minnesota; Kansas; North Dakota; Louisiana; Oklahoma; New Mexico; Washington; Colorado; Utah; California

Languages
- English, Welsh

Religion
- Protestant, Catholic

Related ethnic groups
- Breton Americans, Cornish Americans, English Americans, Scottish Americans, Irish Americans, British Americans, Scotch-Irish Americans, Manx Americans, Welsh Canadians, Welsh Australians

Welsh Americans (Welsh: Americanwyr Cymreig) are an American ethnic group whose ancestry originates wholly or partly in Wales, United Kingdom. In the 2008 U.S. Census community survey, an estimated 1.98 million Americans had Welsh ancestry, 0.6% of the total U.S. population. This compares with a population of 3 million in Wales. However, 3.8% of Americans appear to bear a Welsh surname.

There have been several US presidents with Welsh ancestry, including Thomas Jefferson, John Adams, John Quincy Adams, James A. Garfield, Calvin Coolidge, Richard Nixon, and Barack Obama. Other prominent figures of Welsh descent in American history include Jefferson Davis, the only president of the Confederate States of America.

The proportion of the American population with a name of Welsh origin ranges from 9.5% in South Carolina to 1.1% in North Dakota. Typically, names of Welsh origin are concentrated in the mid-Atlantic states, New England, the Carolinas, Georgia and Alabama and in Appalachia, Kentucky, West Virginia, Ohio, Tennessee.

== Welsh immigration to the United States ==
=== Legendary origins ===
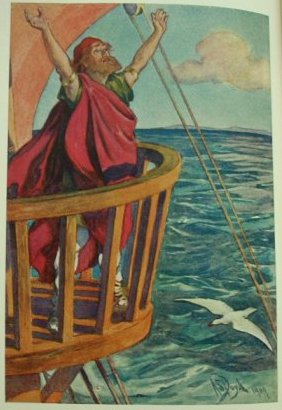
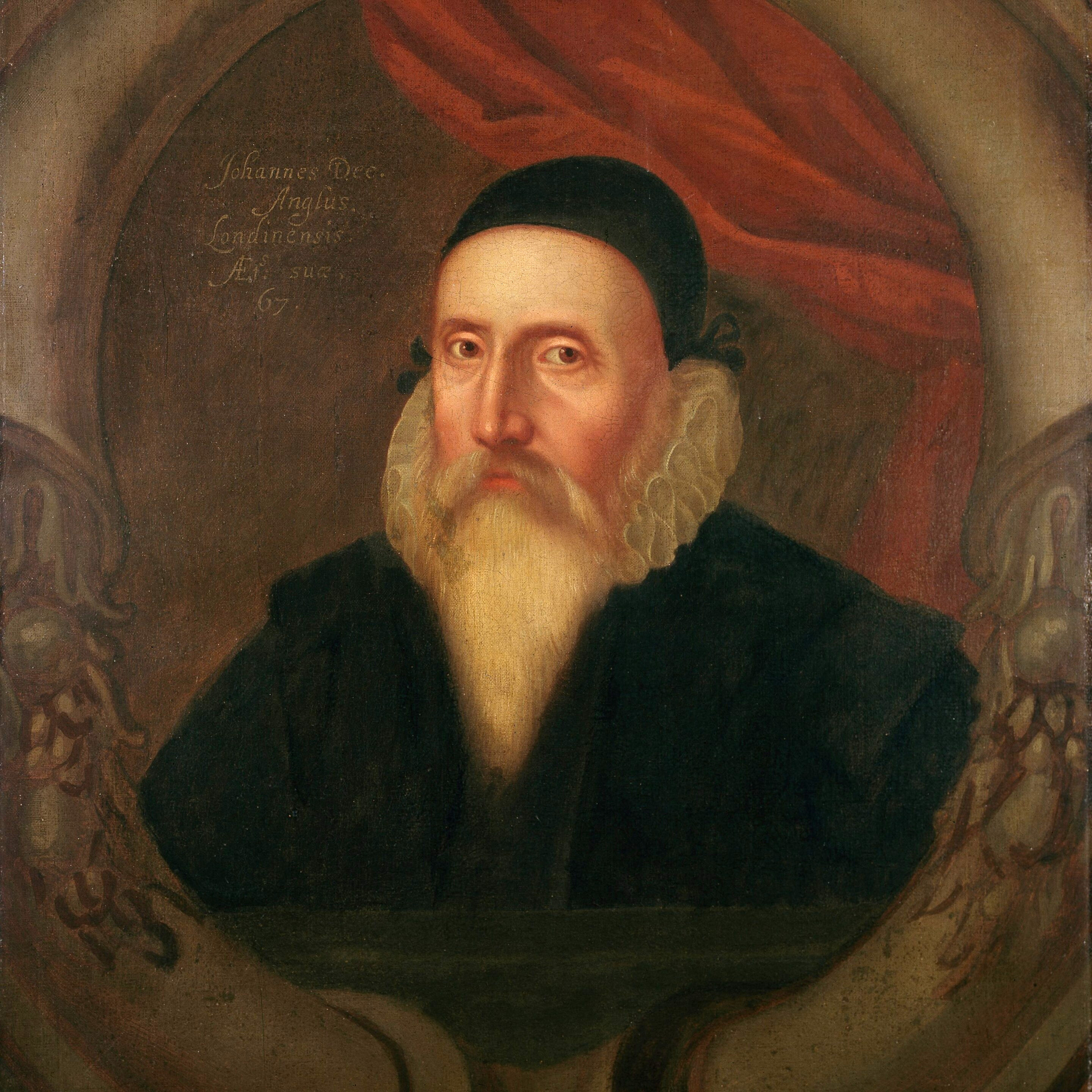
The legendary Prince Madoc (left) is said to have sailed to America and established Welsh settlements. The legend was later used by John Dee (right) to assert the claims of the Tudors in North America.

Welsh Voyages and settlements in America are said to have taken place in the twelfth century, led by Madoc the son of Owain Gwynedd, and prince of the Kingdom of Gwynedd. References to these voyages are found within Medieval Welsh literature and Welsh folklore, but are generally dismissed by modern authors. The Madog legend attained its greatest prominence during the Elizabethan era (the Tudors being of Welsh ancestry) when Welsh and English writers used it bolster British claims in the New World versus those of Spain, France and Portugal. The earliest surviving full account of Madoc's voyage, as the first to make the claim that Madoc had come to America, appears in Humphrey Llwyd 1559 Cronica Walliae, an English adaptation of the Brut y Tywysogion.

An additional aspect of the legend indicates that his settlers ultimately encountered the Mandan, a Native American tribe, who acquired the ability to speak Welsh.

In America, the first governor of Tennessee, John Sevier wrote to his friend Major Amos Stoddard about a conversation he had had in 1782 with the old Cherokee chief Oconostota concerning ancient fortifications built along the Alabama River. The chief allegedly told him that the forts had been built by a group of White people called "Welsh", as protection against the ancestors of the Cherokee, who eventually drove them from the region.

Sevier had also written in 1799 of the alleged discovery of six skeletons in brass armor bearing the Welsh coat-of-arms, a claim seemingly corroborated by Thomas S. Hinde who stated that six soldiers had been dug up near Jeffersonville, Indiana on the Ohio River with breastplates that contained Welsh coat of arms, also in 1799.

While no surviving archaeological or linguistic evidence of the Madoc voyages has survived in the New World, a number of legends connect pre-Columbian Welsh with certain American sites have are still extant. Such as the legends around Devil's Backbone, located on the Ohio River at Fourteen Mile Creek near Louisville, Kentucky.

=== Colonial-era migration ===
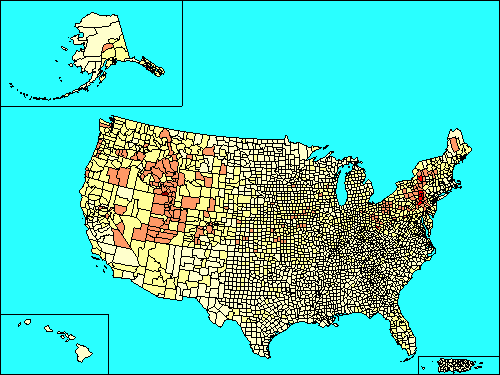
Welsh ancestry. Dark red and brown colors indicate a higher density. (see Maps of American ancestries.)

The first modern documented Welsh arrivals came from Wales after 1618. In the mid to late seventeenth century, there was a large emigration of Welsh Quakers to the Colony of Pennsylvania, where a Welsh Tract was established in the region immediately west of Philadelphia. By 1700, Welsh people accounted for about one-third of the colony's estimated population of twenty thousand. There are a number of Welsh place names in this area. The Welsh were especially numerous and politically active and elected 9% of the members of the Pennsylvania Provincial Council.

In 1757, Rev. Goronwy Owen, an Anglican Vicar born at Y Dafarn Goch, in the parish of Llanfair Mathafarn Eithaf in Anglesey and whose contribution to Welsh poetry is most responsible for the subsequent Welsh eighteenth century Renaissance, emigrated to Williamsburg, in the Colony of Virginia. Until his death on his cotton and tobacco plantation near Lawrenceville, Virginia in 1769, Rev. Owen was mostly noted as an émigré bard, writing with hiraeth ("longing" or "homesickness") for his native Anglesey. During the subsequent revival of the Eisteddfod, the Gwyneddigion Society held up the poetry of Rev. Owen as an example for bards at future eisteddfodau to emulate.

=== Post-Revolutionary migration ===
During the Eisteddfod revival of the 1790s, Gwyneddigion Society member William Jones, who had enthusiastically supported the American Revolution and who was arguing for the creation of a National Eisteddfod of Wales, had come to believe that the completely Anglicized Welsh nobility, through rackrenting and their employment of unscrupulous land agents, had forfeited all right to the obedience and respect of their tenants. At the Llanrwst eisteddfod in June 1791, Jones distributed copies of an address, entitled To all Indigenous Cambro-Britons, in which he urged Welsh tenant farmers and craftsmen to pack their bags, emigrate from Wales, and sail for what he called the "Promised Land" in the United States.

In 1900, there were 93,744 Welsh-born resident in the United States, more than half of whom were settled in Ohio, New York, and Pennsylvania. In those three states, Welsh immigrants tended to work in coal mining, slate quarrying, and metallurgy.

=== Pennsylvania ===
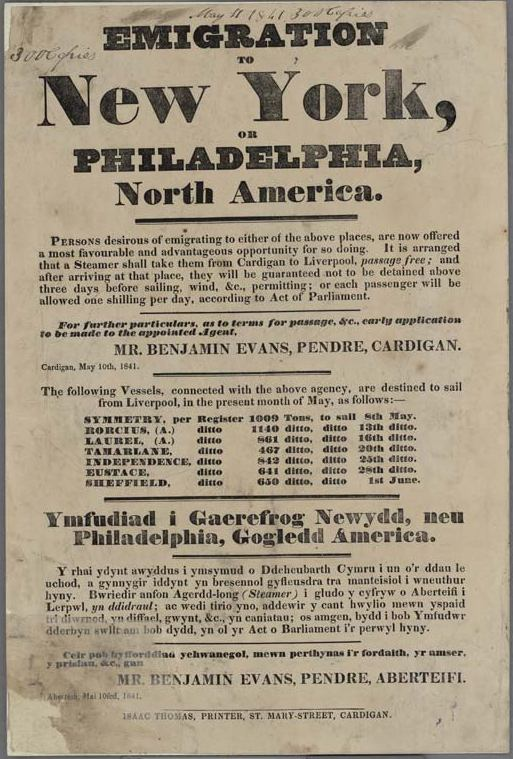
An 1841 poster advertising passage to America, written in English and Welsh

According to Marcus Tanner, large-scale Welsh immigration following the American Revolution began in the 1790s, when 50 immigrants left the village of Llanbrynmair for a tract of Pennsylvania land purchased by Baptist minister Rev. Morgan John Rhys. The result was the farming settlement of Cambria, Pennsylvania.

In the 19th century, thousands of Welsh coal miners emigrated to the anthracite and bituminous mines of Pennsylvania, many becoming mine managers and executives. The miners brought organizational skills, exemplified in the United Mine Workers labor union, and its most famous leader John L. Lewis, who was born in a Welsh settlement in Iowa. Pennsylvania has the most Welsh Americans, approximately 200,000; they are primarily concentrated in the Western and Northeastern (Coal Region) regions of the state.

=== Ohio ===
Welsh settlement in Ohio began in 1801, when a group of Welsh-speaking pioneers migrated from Cambria, Pennsylvania, to Paddy's Run, which is now the site of Shandon, Ohio.

According to Marcus Tanner, "In Ohio State, Jackson and Gallia counties in particular became a 'Little Wales', where Welsh settlers were sufficiently thick on the ground by the 1830s to justify the establishment of Calvinistic Methodist synods."

In the early nineteenth century most of the Welsh settlers were farmers, but later there was emigration by coal miners to the coalfields of Ohio and Pennsylvania and by slate quarrymen from North Wales to the "Slate Valley" region of Vermont and Upstate New York. There was a large concentration of Welsh people in the Appalachian section of Southeast Ohio, such as Jackson County, Ohio, which was nicknamed "Little Wales".

As late as 1900, Ohio still had 150 Welsh-speaking church congregations.

The Welsh language was commonly spoken in the Jackson County area for generations until the 1950s when its use began to subside. As of 2010, more than 126,000 Ohioans are of Welsh descent and about 135 speak the language, with significant concentrations still found in many communities of Ohio such as Oak Hill (13.6%), Madison (12.7%), Franklin (10.5%), Jackson (10.0%), Radnor (9.8%), and Jefferson (9.7%).

== Southern United States ==
A particularly large proportion of the African American population has Welsh surnames. A possible factor leading to this is slaves adopting the surnames of their former masters, though evidence for this is sparse.

Examples of slave- and plantation-owning Welsh Americans include Welsh poet Rev. Goronwy Owen and American Founding Father Thomas Jefferson. While there were cases of slaves adopting their masters' surnames, Welsh religious groups and anti-slavery groups also helped to assist slaves to freedom and evidence exists of names adopted for this reason. In other situations, slaves took on their own new identity of Freeman, Newman, or Liberty, while others chose the surnames of American heroes or founding fathers, which in both cases could have been Welsh in origin.

=== Tennessee ===
The premier recent scholarly treatment of Welsh settlers in Tennessee is the work of Cardiganshire-born Harvard Professor Eirug Davies. To author The Welsh of Tennessee, Davies did extensive research in academic collections, site visits, and interviews with descendants and Welsh émigré residents of Tennessee in the early 21st Century. A short interview with Dr. Davies, discussing his research, is available on-line.

Many Welsh descendants, especially Quakers, migrated to Tennessee—primarily from Colonial settlements in Virginia, North Carolina and South Carolina—pre-Statehood (1796) and in the early years of the 19th Century.

The first organized settlement occurred in the 1850s, inspired by Reverend Samuel Roberts, a Congregational pastor from Llanbrynmair, Montgomeryshire. Engaging with former Ohio governor William Bebb and Welsh immigrant Evan B. Jones, of Cincinnati, Roberts, known as "S.R.", promoted Welsh migration to Scott County, Tennessee. The first emigrants left Wales for Philadelphia in June, 1856. The first settlers arrived at Nancy's Branch in Scott County in September, 1856. Ultimately, the settlement failed. Some of the settlers migrated to Knoxville, while others migrated to other parts of the United States. Only three families, plus Samuel Roberts and John Jones remained at the settlement named Brynyffynon. The National Library of Wales has a collection of original material related to the settlement, identified as the "Tennessee Papers."

Following the American Civil War, several Welsh immigrant families moved from the Welsh Tract in Pennsylvania to Central East Tennessee. These Welsh families settled primarily in an area now known as Mechanicsville in the city of Knoxville. These families were recruited by the brothers Joseph and David Richards to work in a rolling mill then co-owned by John H. Jones.

The Richards brothers co-founded the Knoxville Iron Works beside the L&N Railroad, later to be used as the site for the 1982 World's Fair. Of the original buildings of the Iron Works where Welsh immigrants worked, only the structure housing the restaurant 'The Foundry' remains. At the time of the 1982 World's Fair, the building was known as the Strohaus.

Having first met in donated space at the Second Presbyterian Church, the immigrant Welsh built their own Congregational Church, with the Reverend Thomas Thomas serving as the first pastor in 1870. However, by 1899, the church property was sold. The Welsh celebrated their native culture here, holding services in Welsh and hosting choral competitions and other activities that kept the community connected.

These Welsh-immigrant families became successful and established other businesses in Knoxville. By 1930, many descendants of post-Civil War Knoxville's Welsh families dispersed into other sections of the city and neighboring counties.. Today, scores of families in greater Knoxville can trace their ancestry directly to these original immigrants. The Welsh tradition in Knoxville was remembered with Welsh descendants' celebrating St. David's Day until the early 21st century. The Knoxville Welsh Society is now defunct.

Because of pit mining north of Knoxville, a significant Welsh settlement was established in Anderson and Campbell Counties, especially in the towns of Briceville and Coal Creek (now Rocky Top). The non-profit Coal Creek Watershed Foundation has spearheaded efforts to document and preserve the history of Welsh settlers in this region.

Chattanooga and nearby communities such as Soddy-Daisy were home to Welsh immigrants who worked in the mining and iron industries. The Soddy-Daisy Roots Project and the research of Professor Edward G. Hartmann provide substantial information about the Welsh settlers in southeastern Tennessee.

During 1984–1985, Welsh educator David Greenslade travelled in Tennessee, documenting current and historic Welsh settlements as part of a larger, nationwide study of Welsh in the United States. Greenslade's research resulted in the book, Welsh Fever. Greenslade's papers are archived at the National Library of Wales.

Award-winning actress Dale Dickey is a descendant of Knoxville's Richards brothers. Her ancestor, Reverend R. D. Thomas, another Welsh immigrant to Knoxville, authored the seminal work Hanes Cymru America (History of the Welsh in America) in 1872. A digital version of the original book, in Welsh, is available on-line.

== Midwestern United States ==
After 1850, many Welsh sought out farms in the Midwest.

=== Indiana ===
In the years surrounding the turn of the twentieth century, the towns of Elwood, Anderson and Gas City in Grant and Madison Counties, located northeast of Indianapolis, attracted scores of Welsh immigrants, including many large families and young industrial workers. This was due to the discovery of vast quantities of natural gas in Grant and Madison Counties, Indiana about 1890. Tin plate and glass bottle factories sprung up due to free gas and factory owners sponsored skilled tin plate workers from the Swansea Wales area. Landowners foolishly drilled many wells and burned up the gas 24 hours a day until finally, the gas fields were exhausted about 1910. Most of the Welsh immigrants left for jobs in the Warren, Ohio, area where many foundries existed with many jobs.

=== Minnesota ===
After the Treaty of Traverse des Sioux was signed by the Dakota people in 1851, Welsh-speaking pioneers from Wisconsin and Ohio settled much of what is now Le Sueur and Blue Earth Counties, in Minnesota. By 1857, the number of Welsh speakers was so numerous that the Minnesota State Constitution had to be translated into the Welsh language.

According to The Minnesota Ethnic Food Book, "Early Welsh immigrants settled in the Minnesota River valley in 1853; Blue Earth, Nicollete, and Le Sueur counties were the nucleus of a rural community that reached west into Brown County. While some of the men had been miners in Wales, most seem to have left central and northern Wales looking for land of their own. Families quickly founded enduring farming settlements and, despite a movement of children to Mankato and the Twin Cities metropolitan area, a Welsh presence remains in the river valley to this day."

According to local Welsh language poet James Price, whose bardic name was Ap Dewi ("Son of David"), the first Welsh literary society in Minnesota was founded at a meeting held in South Bend Township, also in Blue Earth County in the fall of 1855. Also according to Ap Dewi, "The first eisteddfod in the State of Minnesota was held in Judson in the house of Wm. C. Williams in 1864. The second eisteddfod was held in 1866 in Judson, in the log chapel, with the Rev. John Roberts as Chairman. Ellis E. Ellis, Robert E. Hughes, H.H. Hughes, Rev. J. Jenkins, and William R. Jones took part in this eisteddfod. The third eisteddfod was held in Judson in the new chapel (Jerusalem) on January 2, 1871. The famous Llew Llwyfo (bardic name) was chairman and a splendid time was had."

By the 1880s, between 2,500 and 3,000 people of Welsh background were contributing to the life of some 17 churches and 22 chapels.

Also according to The Minnesota Ethnic Food Book, "A profile of the Welsh community in the 1980s seems typical of many American ethnic groups: women of the older generation, aged in their sixties and seventies, maintain what there is of traditional foodways; but the younger generation shows revived interest in its heritage. These women have reclaimed old recipes from Welsh cookbooks or brought them back from trips to Wales. Thus Welsh folk occasionally eat Welsh cakes, bara brith, leek soup, and lamb on St. David's Day in honor of the patron saint of Wales."

Welsh cultural events, as well as a Welsh-language classes and a conversation group, continue to be organized by the St. David's Society of Minnesota.

=== Kansas ===
Some 2,000 immigrants from Wales and another nearly 6,000 second-generation Welsh became farmers in Kansas, favoring areas close to the towns of Arvonia, Emporia and Bala. Features of their historic culture survived longest when their church services retained Welsh sermons.

== Mid-Atlantic United States ==
=== New York ===
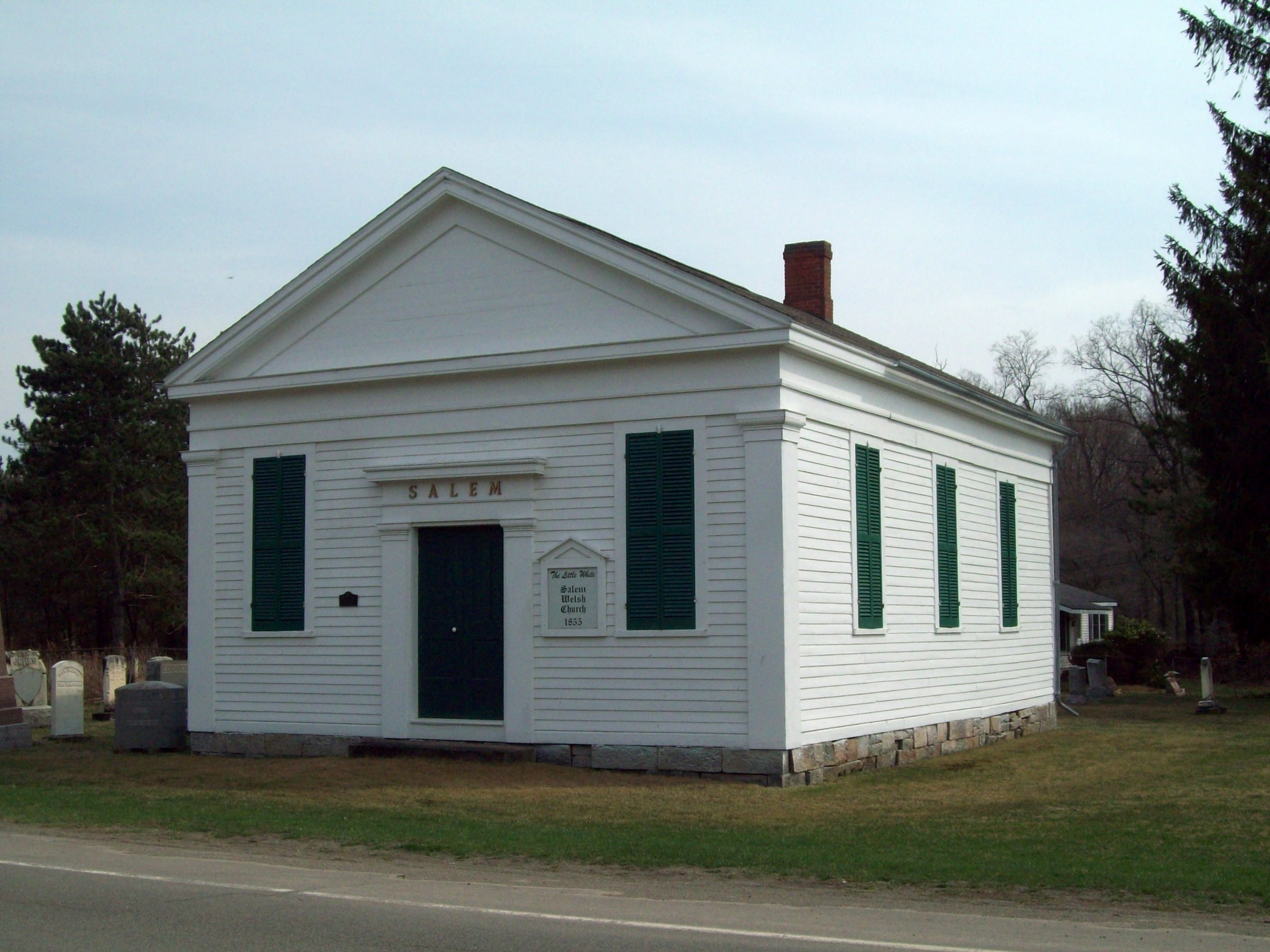
Welsh church in New York.

Oneida County and Utica, New York became the cultural center of the Welsh-American community in the 19th century. Suffering from poor harvests in 1789 and 1802 and dreaming of land ownership, the initial settlement of five Welsh families soon attracted other agricultural migrants, settling Steuben, Utica and Remsen townships. The first Welsh settlers arrived in the 1790s. In 1848, The lexicographer John Russell Bartlett noted that the area had a number of Welsh language newspapers and magazines, as well as Welsh churches. Indeed Bartlett noted in his Dictionary of Americanisms that "one may travel for miles (across Oneida County) and hear nothing but the Welsh language". By 1855, there were four thousand Welshmen in Oneida.

With the Civil War, many Welshmen began moving west, especially to Michigan and Wisconsin. They operated small farms and clung to their historic traditions. The church was the center of Welsh community life, and a vigorous Welsh-speaking press kept ethnic consciousness strong. Blodau Yr Oes ("Flowers of the Age"), first produced in 1872 in Utica, was aimed at children attending Welsh Sunday schools in America. Strongly Republican, the Welsh gradually assimilated into the larger society without totally abandoning their own ethnic cultural patterns.

=== Maryland ===
Five towns in northern Maryland and southern Pennsylvania were constructed between 1850 and 1942 to house Welsh quarry workers producing Peach Bottom slate. During this period the towns retained a Welsh ethnic identity, although their architecture evolved from the traditional Welsh cottage form to contemporary American. Two of the towns in Harford County now form the Whiteford-Cardiff Historic District.

=== Virginia ===
After the Eastern European people, the Welsh people represents a significant minority there.

== Western United States ==
Welsh miners, shepherds and shop merchants arrived in California during the Gold Rush (1849–51), as well the Pacific Northwest and Rocky Mountain States since the 1850s. Large-scale Welsh settlement in Northern California esp. the Sierra Nevada and Sacramento Valley was noted, and one county: Amador County, California finds a quarter of local residents have Welsh ancestry.

=== California ===
Los Angeles and San Francisco have attracted Welsh artists and actors in various fields of the arts and entertainment industry. The following is a short list of notable Welsh artists and actors that have lived and worked in the Los Angeles area: D. W. Griffith, Catherine Zeta-Jones, Richard Burton, Rosemarie Frankland, Michael Sheen, Glynis Johns, Ioan Gruffudd, Ivor Barry, Cate Le Bon, Anthony Hopkins, Tom Jones, Katherine Jenkins, and Terry Nation, among others.

Between 1888 and 2012 the Welsh Presbyterian Church was the center of the Welsh-American community in Los Angeles. The church was founded by the Reverend David Hughes from Llanuwchllyn, Gwynedd at another site. In its prime the church would average 300 immigrants for Sunday service in Welsh and English. Notably, the choir of the church sang in the 1941 film How Green Was My Valley. The singing tradition continued with the Cor Cymraeg De Califfornia, the Welsh Choir of Southern California, a non-denominational 501(c)(3) founded in 1997 still performing across the United States.

Santa Monica, California was named one of the most British towns in America due to its commerce and British migrants who came during a post-World War II boom in factory production, many of whom were Welsh. However, higher cost of living and stricter immigration laws have affected the town once dubbed 'Little Britain'.

In 2011 the West Coast Eisteddfod: Welsh Festival of Arts was the first eisteddfod in the area since 1926. In the following year, the annual Los Angeles St. David's Day Festival sparked a cultural resurgence in the city and the formation of the Welsh League of Southern California in 2014. Celebrities of Welsh heritage Henry Thomas, Ioan Gruffudd, Michael Sheen, along with Richard Burton's and Frank Lloyd Wright's families have all publicly supported the festival.

=== Mormonism ===
Mormon missionaries in Wales in the 1840s and 1850s proved persuasive, and many converts emigrated to Utah. By the mid-nineteenth century, Malad City, Idaho was established. It began largely as a Welsh Mormon settlement and lays claim to having more people of Welsh descent per capita than anywhere outside Wales. This may be around 20%. In 1951 the National Gymanfa Association of the United States and Canada sponsored a collection of Welsh books at the Harold B. Lee Library at Brigham Young University.

== Welsh culture in the United States ==
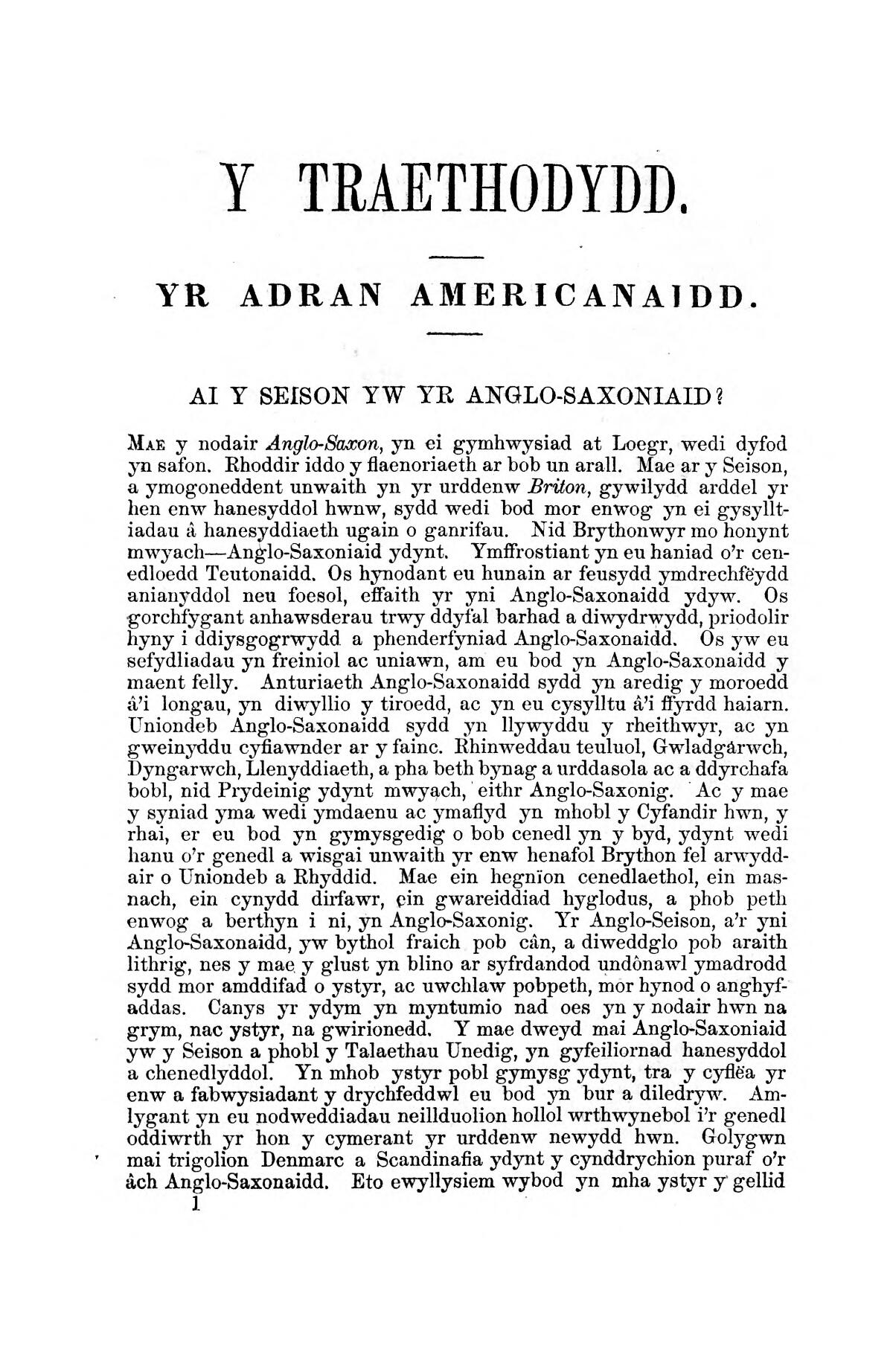
Traethodydd yn America, (Essayists in America) A quarterly periodical for Welsh-Americans in the Welsh language

One area with a strong Welsh influence is an area in Jackson and Gallia counties, Ohio, often known as "Little Cardiganshire". The Madog Center for Welsh Studies is located at the University of Rio Grande. The National Welsh Gymanfa Ganu Association holds the National Festival of Wales yearly in various locations around the country, offering seminars on various cultural items, a marketplace for Welsh goods, and the traditional Welsh hymn singing gathering (the gymanfa ganu).

The annual Los Angeles St. David's Day Festival, celebrates Welsh heritage through performance, workshops, and outdoor marketplace. In Portland, the West Coast Eisteddfod is a yearly Welsh event focusing on art competitions and performance in the bardic tradition. On a smaller scale, many states across the country hold regular Welsh Society meetings.

Many places in the United States bear Welsh names, such as Bryn Mawr, Pennsylvania, Cardiff, Illinois and Ebensburg, Pennsylvania.

=== Tin workers ===
Before 1890, Wales was the world's leading producer of tinplate, especially as used for canned foods. The U.S. was the primary customer. The McKinley tariff of 1890 raised the duty on tinplate that year, and in response, many entrepreneurs and skilled workers emigrated to the U.S., especially to the Pittsburgh region. They built extensive occupational networks and a transnational niche community.

=== Entertainment ===
The American daytime soap opera One Life to Live took place in a fictional Pennsylvania town outside of Philadelphia known as Llanview (llan is an old Welsh word for church, now encountered mainly in place names). Llanview was loosely based on the Welsh settlements located in the Welsh Barony, or Welsh Tract, located northwest of Philadelphia.

=== Cuisine ===
Welsh settlers adopted Welsh cuisine to the circumstances of their new environment. In southern Ohio, Welsh settlers cleared dense forests to create farmland, where they cultivated corn and wheat to make Welsh staples such as stews (Cawl) and rustic breads. The settlers also kept pigs, sheep, chickens and cows as their forebearers did for centuries in Wales but were forced to largely abandon the coastal aspects of Welsh cuisine such as Laverbread and Cockles. The pioneers used large cast-iron kettles often brought with them from Wales. Some of these original kettles have been maintained and used by the same Ohio-Welsh families for generations, and used for everything from making apple butter to washing clothes. Today, Welsh cakes and Bara brith favorites at Welsh American events, typically served with Welsh tea.

== Demographics ==
New Amsterdam, Indiana and Peru, Pennsylvania have the highest percentage of Welsh Americans.

== 21st century ==
Relations between Wales and America are primarily conducted through the United Kingdom's government, most commonly the persons of the Prime Minister, the Foreign Secretary, and the Ambassador to the United States. Nevertheless, the Welsh Government has deployed its own envoy to America, primarily to promote Wales-specific business interests. The primary Welsh Government Office is based out of the Washington British Embassy, with satellites in New York City, Chicago, San Francisco, and Atlanta.

=== Current immigrants ===
While most Welsh immigrants came to the U.S. between the early 17th century and the early 20th century, immigration has by no means stopped. Current expatriates have formed societies all across the country, including the Chicago Tafia (a play on "Mafia" and "Taffy"), AmeriCymru and New York Welsh/Cymry Efrog Newydd. This only amounts to a few social groups and some "High Profile" individuals. Currently, Welsh immigration to the United States is very low.

== See also ==
- Canadians of Welsh descent
- Celtic music in the United States
- Eisteddfod
- Maps of American ancestries
- Welsh settlement in the Americas
- Welsh History in Chicago
- Chicago Welsh Societies
- Chicago Tafia
- British Americans
- Cornish Americans
- English Americans
- Scottish Americans
- Manx Americans
- Irish Americans
- Welsh people
- Celtic Britons
- Welsh language
- Welsh diaspora
- List of place names of Welsh origin in the United States
- Locations in the United States with a Welsh name
