= British Canadians =

Canadians of British ancestry

British Canadians Canadiens d'origines Britanniques
- (United Kingdom) (Canada)
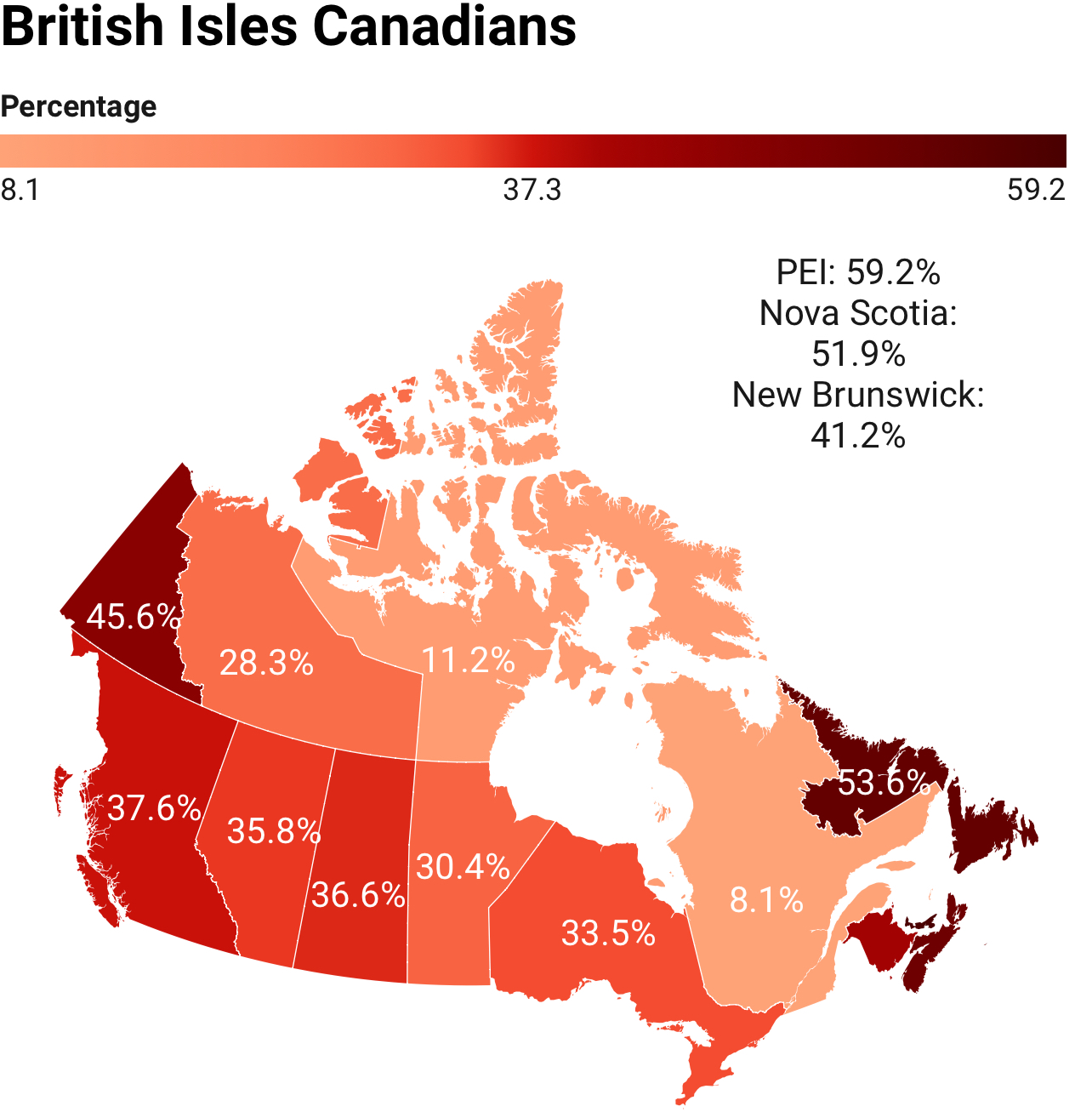
- Percent of Canadians who reported British Isles ancestry by province/territory, per the 2021 census

Total population
- 11,211,850 (Note: Statistic includes all ancestral ethnocultural backgrounds of the British Isles. Additionally, 1996-present census populations are undercounts, due to the creation of the "Canadian" ethnic origin category. (Note: All citizens of Canada are classified as "Canadians" as defined by Canada's nationality laws. However, "Canadian" as an ethnic group has since 1996 been added to census questionnaires for possible ancestry. "Canadian" was included as an example on the English questionnaire and "Canadien" as an example on the French questionnaire. "The majority of respondents to this selection are from the eastern part of the country that was first settled. Respondents generally are visibly European (Anglophones and Francophones), however no-longer self identify with their ethnic ancestral origins. This response is attributed to a multitude or generational distance from ancestral lineage. Source 1: Jack Jedwab (April 2008). "Our 'Cense' of Self: the 2006 Census saw 1.6 million 'Canadian'" (PDF). Association for Canadian Studies. Archived from the original (PDF) on October 2, 2011. ""Virtually all persons who reported "Canadian" in 1996 had English or French as a mother tongue, were born in Canada and had both parents born inside Canada. This suggests that many of these respondents were people whose families have been in this country for several generations. In effect the "new Canadians" were persons that previously reported either British or French origins. Moreover in 1996 some 55% of people with both parents born in Canada reported Canadian (alone or in combination with other origins). By contrast, only 4% of people with both parents born outside Canada reported Canadian. Thus the Canadian response did not appeal widely to either immigrants or their children."(Page 2)" Source 2: Don Kerr (2007). The Changing Face of Canada: Essential Readings in Population. Canadian Scholars' Press. pp. 313–317. ISBN 978-1-55130-322-2.)) (Note: Statistics Canada demi-decadal censuses officially use the name "British Isles Origins" for the various nationalities and ethnicities that are in the region. See 2016, 2011, or 2006 censuses as examples); 32.5% of the total Canadian population (2016)

Regions with significant populations
- Throughout Canada less prevalent in Quebec and the North

Languages
- Canadian English, British English, Canadian French

Religion
- Protestant, Catholicism

Related ethnic groups
- British people, Irish people, British Americans, British Australians, British New Zealanders, Old Stock Canadians

British Canadians are Canadians who were either born in or can trace their ancestry to the British Isles, which includes the nations of England, Ireland, Scotland, Wales, and Northern Ireland.

The term British Canadian is a subgroup of European Canadians and, according to Statistics Canada, can further be divided by nationality, such as English Canadian, Irish Canadian, or Scottish Canadian.

As of 2016, 11,211,850 Canadians had British Isles geographical origins, constituting 32.5% of the total Canadian population and 44.6% of the total European Canadian population. However, this number is an undercount due to the "Canadian" ethnic origin category on the census being the sole choice for many Canadians of British Isles descent who are several generations removed from their country of origin.

== Terminology ==
"British Canadians" may include: Cornish Canadians; English Canadians (meaning either ethnic origin and heritage, or English-speaking (Anglophone) Canadians of any ethnic origin); Irish Canadians; Manx Canadians; Scottish Canadians; Scotch-Irish Canadians and Welsh Canadians.

== History ==
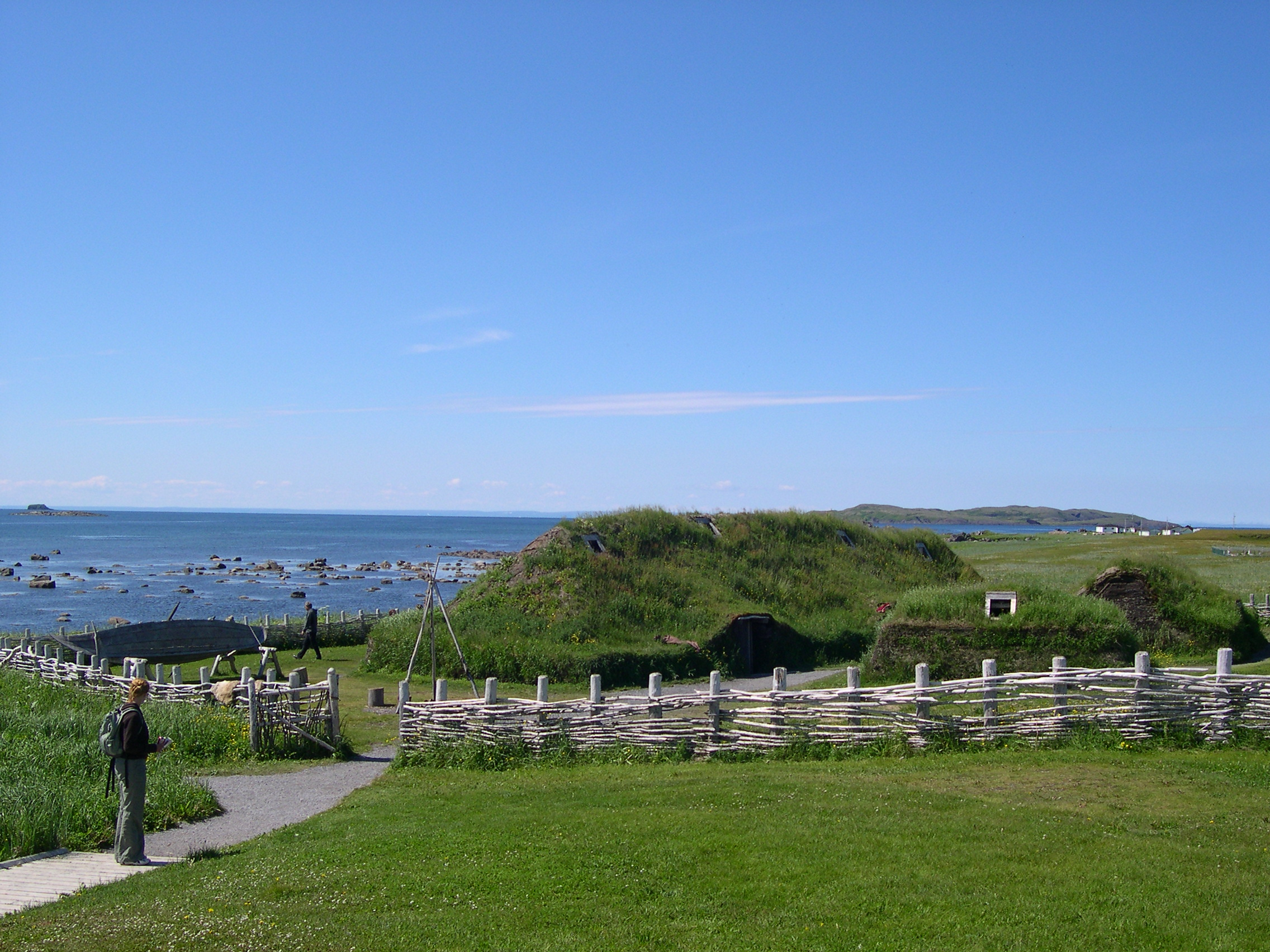
A reconstruction of Norse buildings at the UNESCO listed L'Anse aux Meadows site in Newfoundland, Canada. Archaeological evidence demonstrates that iron working, carpentry, and boat repair were conducted at the site.

Ethnic British Canadian Population History
Year	Pop.	±%
1871	2,110,502	—
1881	2,548,514	+20.8%
1901	3,063,195	+20.2%
1911	3,999,081	+30.6%
1921	4,868,738	+21.7%
1931	5,381,071	+10.5%
1941	5,715,904	+6.2%
1951	6,709,685	+17.4%
1961	7,996,669	+19.2%
1971	9,624,115	+20.4%
1981	11,110,925	+15.4%
1986	12,371,485	+11.3%
1991	12,047,920	−2.6%
1996	10,647,625	−11.6%
2001	9,971,615	−6.3%
2006	11,098,610	+11.3%
2011	11,343,710	+2.2%
2016	11,211,850	−1.2%
Source: Statistics Canada Note1: 1981 Canadian census only included partial multiple ethnic origin responses for individuals with British and French ancestry, thus population is an undercount. Note2: 1996-present census populations are undercounts, due to the creation of the "Canadian" ethnic origin category.

The first documented source of individuals from the British Isles in what would become Canada comes from the Saga of Erik the Red and the Viking expedition of 1010 AD to Vinland (literally, the land of meadows), which is believed to refer to the island of Newfoundland. The Viking prince Thorfinn Karlsefni took two Scottish slaves to Vinland. When the longships moored along the coast, they sent the slaves ashore to run along the waterfront to gauge whether it was safe for the rest of the crew to follow. After the Scots survived a day without being attacked, by either human or animal, the Vikings deemed it safe to spend the night ashore. The expedition was abandoned three years later; the original sagas were passed on in an oral tradition and then written down 250 years later.

=== 16th century ===
English Canadian history starts with the attempts to establish English settlements in Newfoundland in the sixteenth century. The first English settlement in present-day Canada was at St. Johns Newfoundland, in 1583. Newfoundland's population was significantly influenced by Irish and English immigration, much of it as a result of the migratory fishery in the decades prior to the Great Famine of Ireland.

The first recorded Irish presence in the area of present-day Canada dates from 1536, when Irish fishermen from Cork traveled to Newfoundland.

=== 18th century ===
The area that forms the present day province of Nova Scotia was contested by the British and French in the eighteenth century. French settlements at Port Royal, Louisbourg and what is now Prince Edward Island were seized by the British. After the 1713 Treaty of Utrecht ceded the French colony of Acadia (today's mainland Nova Scotia and New Brunswick) to Great Britain, efforts to colonize the province were limited to small settlements in Canso and Annapolis Royal.

In 1749, Colonel Edward Cornwallis was given command of an expedition for the settlement of Chebucto by some three thousand persons, many of whom were Cockney. Cornwallis' settlement, Halifax, would become the provincial capital, the primary commercial centre for the Maritime provinces, a strategic British military and naval outpost and an important east coast cultural centre. To offset the Catholic presence of Acadians, foreign Protestants (mainly German) were given land and founded Lunenburg. Nova Scotia itself saw considerable immigration from Scotland, particularly to communities such as Pictou in the northern part of the province and to Cape Breton Island, but this began only with the arrival of the Hector in 1773.

After the fall of New France to the British in 1759, a colonial governing class established itself in Quebec City. Larger numbers of English-speaking settlers arrived in the Eastern Townships and Montreal after the American Revolution.

A large group of Ulster Scots, many of whom had first settled in New Hampshire, moved to Truro, Nova Scotia in 1761.

New Brunswick became the home for many Scots. In 1761, a Highland regiment garrisoned Fort Frederick. The surrounding lands surveyed by Captain Bruce in 1762 attracted many Scottish traders when William Davidson of Caithness arrived to settle two years later. Their numbers were swelled by the arrival of thousands of loyalists of Scottish origin both during and after the American Revolution. One of the New Brunswick and Canada's most famous regiments was "The King's First American Regiment" founded in 1776. It was composed mostly of Highlanders, many of whom fought with their traditional kilts to the sound of bagpipes. The regiment distinguished itself when it defeated Washington's forces at the Battle of Brandywine. When it disbanded after the War, most of its members settled in New Brunswick.

In 1772, a wave of Gaels began to arrive in Prince Edward Island, and in 1773, the ship Hector brought 200 Gaels to Pictou, beginning a new stream of Highland emigration — the town's slogan is "The Birthplace of New Scotland". At the end of the 18th century, Cape Breton Island had become a centre of Scottish Gaelic settlement, where only Scottish Gaelic was spoken. Furthermore, a number of Scottish loyalists to the British crown, who had fled the United States in 1783, arrived in Glengarry County (in eastern Ontario) and Nova Scotia.

Prince Edward Island (PEI) was also heavily influenced by Scottish Gaelic settlers. One prominent settler in PEI was John MacDonald of Glenaladale, who conceived the idea of sending Gaels to Nova Scotia on a grand scale after Culloden. The name Macdonald still dominates on the island, which received a large influx of settlers, predominantly Catholics from the Highlands, in the late 18th century.

The history of English Canadians is bound to the history of English settlement of North America, and particularly New England, because of the resettlement of many Loyalists following the American Revolution in areas that would form part of Canada. Many of the fifty thousand Loyalists who were resettled to the north of the United States after 1783 came from families that had already been settled for several generations in North America and were from prominent families in Boston, New York and other east coast towns. Although largely of British ancestry, these settlers had also intermarried with Huguenot and Dutch colonists and were accompanied by Loyalists of African descent. Dispossessed of their property at the end of the Revolutionary War, the Loyalists arrived as refugees to settle primarily along the shores of southern Nova Scotia, the Bay of Fundy and the Saint John River and in Quebec to the east and southwest of Montreal. The colony of New Brunswick was created from western part of Nova Scotia at the instigation of these new English-speaking settlers. The Loyalist settlements in southwestern Quebec formed the nucleus of what would become the province of Upper Canada and, after 1867, Ontario.

At the end of the 18th century, Cape Breton Island had become a centre of Scottish Gaelic settlement, where only Scottish Gaelic was spoken. Throughout the 18th and 19th centuries, Canadian Gaelic was spoken as the first language in much of "Anglophone" Canada, such as Nova Scotia, Prince Edward Island, and Glengarry County in Ontario. Gaelic was the third most commonly spoken language in Canada.

Welsh mapmaker David Thompson was one of the great explorers of the North West Company in the late 18th and early 19th centuries, and is often called "Canada's Greatest Geographer". He covered 130,000 kilometres on foot and surveyed most of the Canada–United States border in the early days of exploration.

=== 19th century ===
Upper Canada was a primary destination for English, Scottish and Scots-Irish settlers to Canada in the nineteenth century, and was on the front lines in the War of 1812 between the British Empire and the United States.

Another large group of Scottish Gaels immigrated to Canada and settled in Prince Edward Island in 1803. This migration, primarily from the Isle of Skye, was organized by the Earl of Selkirk, Lord Thomas Douglas, 5th Earl of Selkirk. The Earl, who was sympathetic to the plight of the dispossessed crofters (tenant farmers in the Highlands), brought 800 colonists to Prince Edward Island. In 1811, he founded the Red River Colony as a Scottish colonization project on an area of 300,000 square kilometres (120,000 sq mi) in what would later be the province of Manitoba — land that was granted by the Hudson's Bay Company, in what is referred to as the Selkirk Concession.

After the permanent settlement in Newfoundland by Irish in the late 18th and early 19th centuries, overwhelmingly from County Waterford, increased immigration of the Irish elsewhere in Canada began in the decades following the War of 1812 and formed a significant part of The Great Migration of Canada. Between 1825 and 1845, 60% of all immigrants to Canada were Irish; in 1831 alone, some 34,000 arrived in Montreal. Between 1830 and 1850, 624,000 Irish arrived; in contextual terms, at the end of this period, the population of the provinces of Canada was 2.4 million. Besides Upper Canada (Ontario), Lower Canada (Quebec), the Maritime colonies of Nova Scotia, Prince Edward Island and New Brunswick, especially Saint John, were arrival points. Not all remained; many out-migrated to the United States or to Western Canada in the decades that followed. Few returned to Ireland.

The earliest English and Scottish settlements in Assiniboia (part of present-day Manitoba) involved some 300 largely Scottish colonists under the sponsorship of Thomas Douglas, Lord Selkirk in 1811.

One of the first efforts to encourage Welsh emigration to Canada began in 1812, when Welsh native John Mathews endeavoured to bring his family to Canada. Mathews left home at a young age and went on to become a successful businessman in the United States. When he returned to Wales, he found his family living in poverty and became convinced they should emigrate to Canada. In 1817 his family settled in the township of Southwald, near what is now London, Ontario. By 1812, he had brought over more relatives who built homes on the 100-acre (0.40 km^{2}) lots granted to them by Colonel Thomas Talbot.

English, Scottish, and Irish communities established themselves in Montreal in the 1800s. Montreal would become Canada's largest city and commercial hub in Canada.

A continual influx of immigrants from Scotland and Ulster meant that by 1843 there were over 30,000 Scots in New Brunswick.

Broader English, Scottish, and Irish settlement of British Columbia began in earnest with the founding of Fort Victoria in 1843 and the subsequent creation of the Colony of Vancouver Island in 1849. The capital, Victoria developed during the height of the British Empire and long self-identified as being "more English than the English".

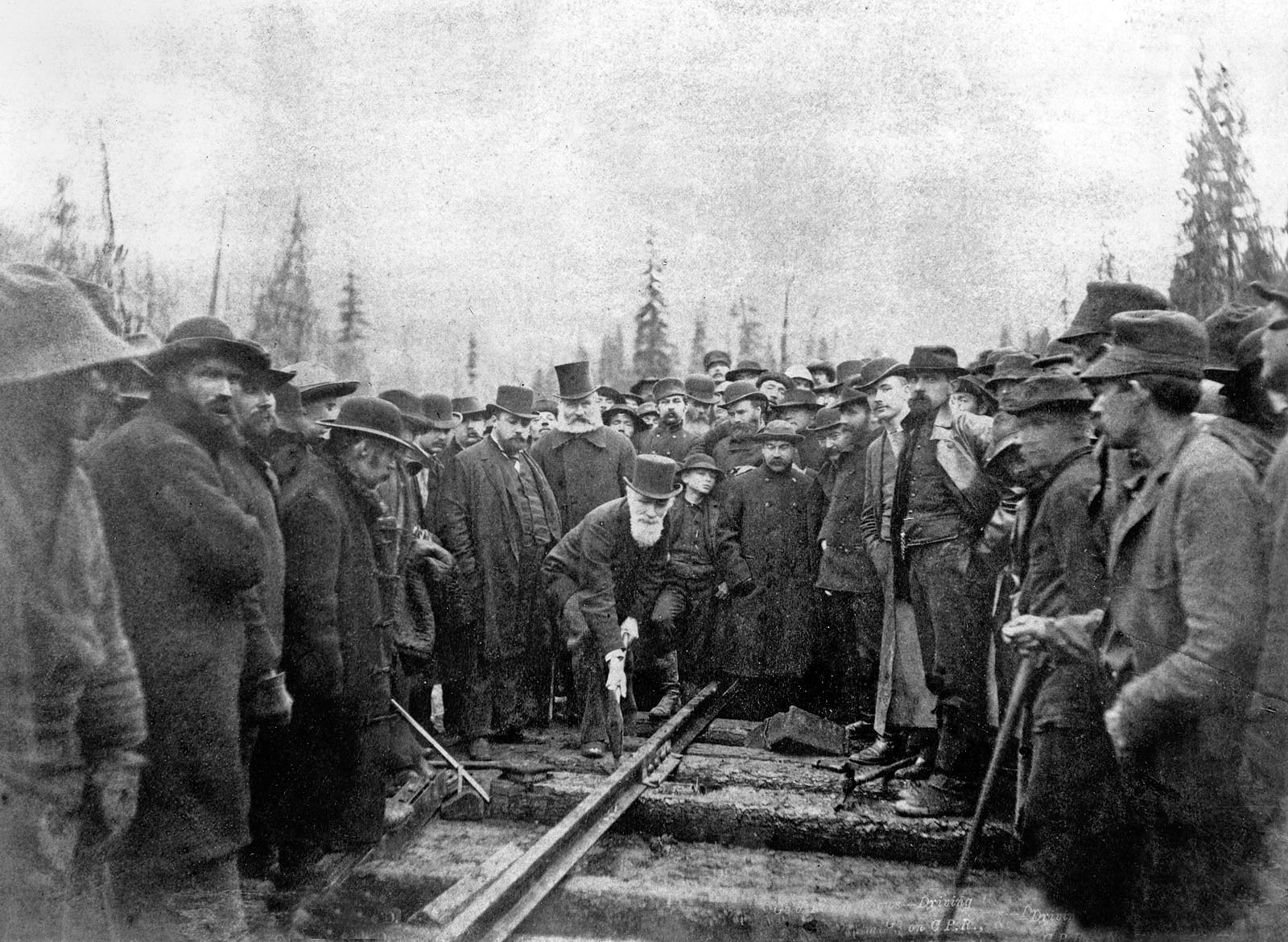
Scottish-Canadian Lord Strathcona drives the last spike of the Canadian Pacific Railway at Craigellachie, November 7, 1885.

During the Great Famine of Ireland (1845–1852), Canada received the most destitute Irish Catholics, who left Ireland in grave circumstances. Land estate owners in Ireland would either evict landholder tenants to board on returning empty lumber ships, or in some cases pay their fares. Others left on ships from the overcrowded docks in Liverpool and Cork. Most of the Irish immigrants who came to Canada and the United States in the nineteenth century and before were Irish speakers, with many knowing no other language on arrival.

The French-English tensions that marked the establishment of the earliest English-speaking settlements in Nova Scotia were echoed on the Prairies in the late 19th century.

=== 20th century ===
In 1902, Welsh immigrants arrived from Patagonia, which had been incorporated into Argentina in 1881. Compulsory military service and a series of floods that ruined Welsh farmers' crops led to some emigrants resettling at Llewelyn near Bangor, Saskatchewan, where they once again took up farming. A community of Welsh farmers was also established at Wood River near Ponoka, Alberta.

== Demography ==
Canadians of British Isles descent total population (1871−2016)
Note1: 1981 Canadian census only included partial multiple ethnic origin responses for individuals with British and French ancestry, thus population is an undercount.
Note2: 1996-present census populations are undercounts, due to the creation of the "Canadian" ethnic origin category.
Canadians of British Isles descent percentage of the total population (1871−2016)
Note1: 1981 Canadian census only included partial multiple ethnic origin responses for individuals with British and French ancestry, thus population is an undercount.
Note2: 1996-present census populations are undercounts, due to the creation of the "Canadian" ethnic origin category.

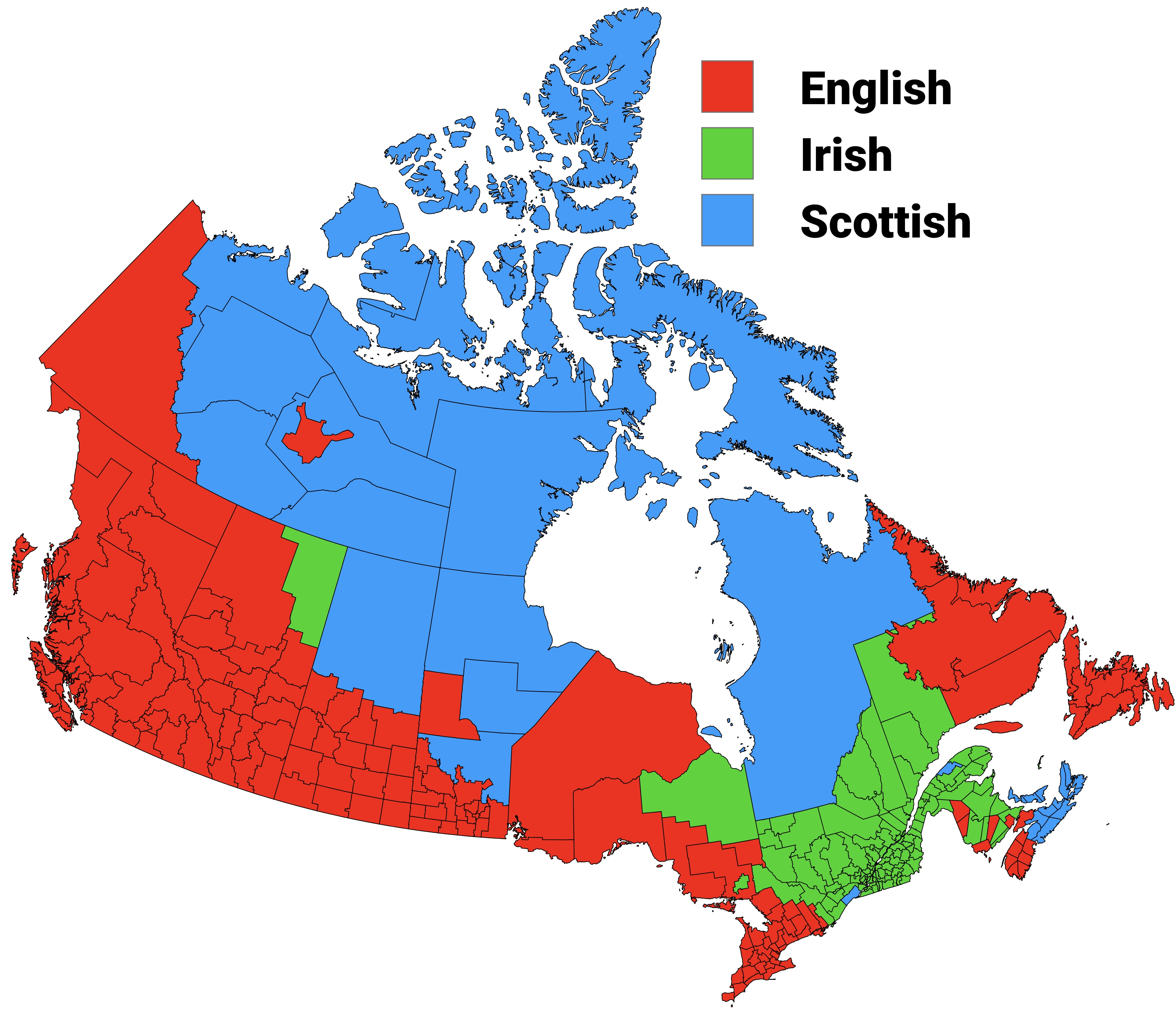
Largest self reported British Isles ancestry by census division in Canada, per the 2021 census

=== Population ===
British Canadian Population History 1871−2016
Year	Population	% of total population
1871	2,110,502	60.546%
1881	2,548,514	58.928%
1901	3,063,195	57.029%
1911	3,999,081	55.492%
1921	4,868,738	55.402%
1931	5,381,071	51.857%
1941	5,715,904	49.675%
1951	6,709,685	47.894%
1961	7,996,669	43.846%
1971	9,624,115	44.622%
1981	11,110,925	46.135%
1986	12,371,485	49.442%
1991	12,047,920	44.632%
1996	10,647,625	37.323%
2001	9,971,615	33.644%
2006	11,098,610	35.526%
2011	11,343,710	34.529%
2016	11,211,850	32.536%

== See also ==
- European Canadians
- English Canadians
- Irish Canadians
- Scottish Canadians
- Welsh Canadians
- British North America
- British Columbia
- British Americans
- Canadian British
- British–Canadian relations
