= Chicago Welsh Societies =

There are at least three associations of people with Welsh origins in Chicago. These are the Chicago Tafia, the Cambrian Benevolent Society of Chicago, and the Women’s Welsh Club of Illinois.

== The Cambrian Benevolent Society of Chicago ==
The Cambrian Benevolent Society of Chicago (CBS) is the oldest Welsh society in Chicago. It was founded in 1853 to 'afford pecuniary relief to Welsh people and their descendants...in indigent circumstances...and also for the purpose of effecting the social improvement of its members' (CBS by-laws 1906). Relief was provided to individuals and families who fell on hard times and every Welsh man, woman or child who died in the city or surrounding area without sufficient funds for a funeral was properly and respectfully buried. Money was raised through annual dues, tickets to concerts and picnics and from generous donations of members. It is one of the oldest cultural societies in Illinois. Officers and members of the society helped to organize an international eisteddfod (Welsh cultural festival) in Chicago in September 1893 on the grounds of the 'White City' at the World's Fair and Columbian Exposition.

The society holds an annual St. David's Day banquet around March 1, organizes a summer picnic, and mans a booth at Celtic Fest in Grant Park, Chicago in September to promote Wales and to educate Chicagoans about Wales and the Welsh. In November members of the society decorate the Welsh tree at the Museum of Science & Industry's annual 'Christmas Around the World' exhibition with symbols of Wales e.g. harps, red dragons, lovespoons, daffodils, and in the spring they hold a traditional Cymanfa Ganu (Singing Festival) in a local church to celebrate their love of singing. Board members are currently working on a project to catalogue Welsh graves in local cemeteries.

== The Women’s Welsh Club of Illinois ==
The Women's Welsh Clubs of America originated in Cleveland, Ohio in 1914. Plans for the Illinois Club began in early spring of 1955 when a committee met at the home of Estelle Roberts Schubert. It was then called the Welsh Women's Club. The first open meeting was held on June 20, 1955 at the Carleton Hotel in Oak Park. There were 63 women present. Within a short time 61 of them became charter members and many more joined that first year. The first President of the Women's Welsh Club of Illinois was Miss Myra Thomas. The Illinois Club is one of only a handful remaining in the country and continues to meet regularly.

== The Chicago Tafia Welsh Society ==
The Chicago Tafia is an expatriate Welsh group that was formed in Chicago in 1999. As one of the youngest and consequently the most contemporary Welsh groups in North America, they are well-known to provide a real link to the present culture of Wales to the Chicago area.

The group’s activities are varied with social get-together s to watch Welsh sporting events and musicians in addition to the typical cultural events such as St. David’s Day. That is not to say that the traditional elements of Welsh culture are taken for granted by the group, over the years they have been involved with over a dozen concerts for Welsh male voice choirs in the Chicago area, including the Pendyrus, Penrhyn, Bangor, Black Mountain, Burlington, Hogia'r Ddwylan and CF1 choirs at prominent Chicago venues.

In 2007 the group scored a double hit by attracting the former lead singer of Catatonia, Cerys Matthews to entertain the group at their annual St. David’s Day party and also the passing of Illinois General Assembly signing into law Bill HR0149 that proclaimed March 1, 2007, and each year thereafter, as St. David's Day in the State of Illinois and recognizing the Welsh contribution to the state.

From 2009 to 2023, The Chicago Tafia partnered with the owners of the Wrigley Building, Prudential Plaza, and other iconic Chicago buildings to illuminate the skyline red, white, and green (the colours of the Welsh flag) on Saint David's Day on Sunday, March 1.

In 2019, following the defacement of the Cofiwch Dryweryn mural in Llanrhystud, Wales, the Chicago Tafia partnered with Pleasant House Pub in Pilsen to paint a tribute Cofiwch Dryweryn mural in the pub.

An offshoot of the Chicago Tafia is the Chicago Swansea City Supporters Club.

== See also ==
- Wales
- Welsh American
- Welsh History in Chicago
