= Welsh Canadians =

Canadians of Welsh ancestry or Wales-born people who reside in Canada

Canadiaid Cymreig (Welsh) Canadiens gallois (French)
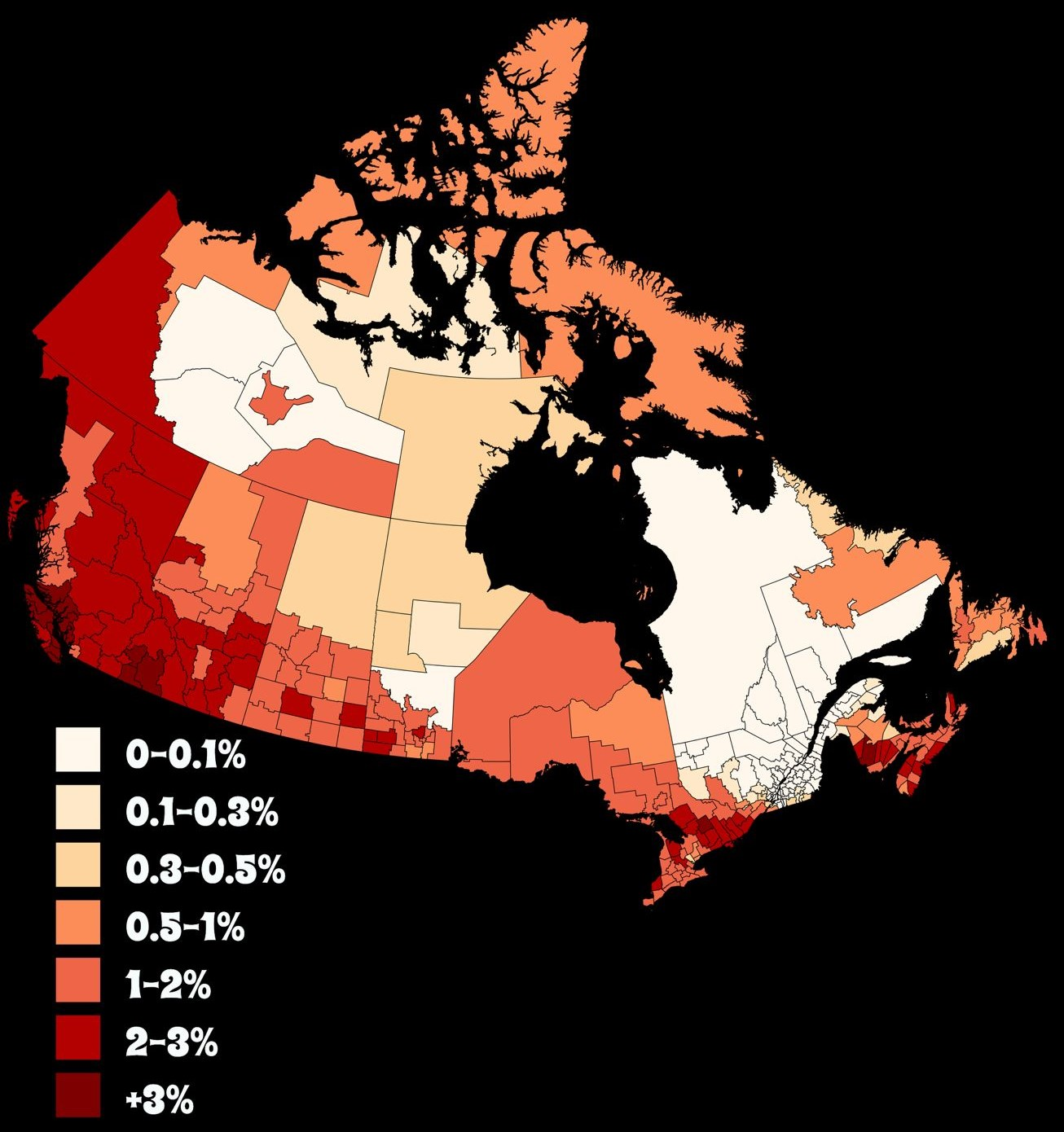
- Population distribution of Welsh Canadians by census division, 2021 census

Total population
- 474,805 (by ancestry, 2016 Census)

Regions with significant populations
- Ontario, Western Canada, Atlantic Canada

Languages
- Welsh, English, French

Religion
- Traditionally Christianity

Related ethnic groups
- Welsh, Welsh Americans, Welsh Argentines, Cornish Canadians, Breton Canadians

Welsh Canadians are Canadian citizens of Welsh descent or Wales-born people who reside in Canada.

According to the 2011 Census, 458,705 Canadians claimed full or partial Welsh descent. This increased to 474,805 in the 2016 Census

Categorically, Welsh Canadians comprise a subgroup of British Canadians which is a further subgroup of European Canadians. (Note: Statistics Canada demi-decadal censuses officially use the name "British Isles Origins" for the various nationalities and ethnicities that are in the region. See 2016, 2011, or 2006 censuses as examples)

== History ==
Welsh Canadian Population History
Year	Pop.	±%
1971	74,415	—
1981	46,620	−37.4%
1986	150,285	+222.4%
1991	197,855	+31.7%
1996	338,905	+71.3%
2001	350,365	+3.4%
2006	440,960	+25.9%
2011	458,705	+4.0%
2016	474,805	+3.5%
Source: Statistics Canada Note1: 1981 Canadian census did not include multiple ethnic origin responses, thus population is an undercount. Note2: 1996-present census populations are undercounts, due to the creation of the "Canadian" ethnic origin category.

Welsh mapmaker David Thompson was one of the great explorers of the North West Company in the late 18th and early 19th centuries, and is often called "Canada's Greatest Geographer". He covered 130,000 kilometres on foot and surveyed most of the Canada–United States border in the early days of exploration.

One of the first efforts to encourage Welsh emigration to Canada began in 1812, when Welsh native John Mathews endeavoured to bring his family to Canada. Mathews left home at a young age and went on to become a successful businessman in the United States. When he returned to Wales, he found his family living in poverty and became convinced they should emigrate to Canada. In 1817 his family settled in the township of Southwald, near what is now London, Ontario. By 1812 he had brought over more relatives who built homes on the 100-acre (0.40 km^{2}) lots granted to them by Colonel Thomas Talbot. The colony attracted 385 Welsh settlers by 1850 and retained its predominantly Welsh character until the late 1870s.

Early Welsh immigration to Canada was also spurred on by the Cariboo Gold Rush in British Columbia in 1858. The development of underground mining provided employment for many Welsh coal miners who decided to remain in the area.

In 1902, Welsh immigrants arrived from Patagonia, which had been incorporated into Argentina in 1881. Compulsory military service and a series of floods that ruined Welsh farmers' crops led to some emigrants resettling at Llewelyn near Bangor, Saskatchewan, where they once again took up farming. A community of Welsh farmers was also established at Wood River near Ponoka, Alberta.

=== Welsh in Alberta ===
Historically, Alberta has had the highest number of people of Welsh descent as a proportion to population. In the 2016 Census, there are 80,455 people identifying as being of Welsh descent, which is around 2% of the total population of Alberta.

- Earl W. Bascom (1906-1995), artist, inventor, rodeo pioneer, "Father of Modern Rodeo" and of Welsh descent
- David Milwyn Duggan, a Welshman, was the mayor of Edmonton from 1921 to 1923.

== Culture ==
Welsh festivals in Canada today include Eisteddfodau, and Gymanfa Ganu. The Welsh in Canada celebrate St. David's Day, March 1st, the celebrations include storytelling and singing; banquets are also held in Lethbridge, Ponoka, Calgary, Red Deer, Edmonton, Regina, Saskatchewan, and Fort McMurray. In Eastern Canada, the Central New Brunswick Welsh Society celebrates St. David's Day by hoisting the Welsh flag on March 1 at both the Provincial Legislature and City Hall in Fredericton, followed by a dinner for members and guests.

A newsletter serves the Welsh communities in Calgary and Lethbridge, while in Edmonton the St. David's Society issues a bulletin twice a year informing its members about upcoming events. Some Welsh Canadians subscribe to Ninnau, the Welsh national newspaper published in New York.

Welsh-Canadians have been active in the country's cultural life, supplying Canada with some of its more lively characters including novelist Robertson Davies, Powys Thomas, co-founder of the national theatre school, and Robert Harris, painter of the Fathers of Confederation.

== Demographics ==
=== Welsh Canadians by Canadian province or territory (2016) ===
Province	Population	Percentage	Source
Ontario	198,470	1.5%	
British Columbia	113,905	2.5%	
Alberta	80,455	2.0%	
Manitoba	17,760	1.4%	
Nova Scotia	17,135	1.9%	
Saskatchewan	17,785	1.7%	
Quebec	10,765	0.1%	
New Brunswick	10,110	1.4%	
Newfoundland and Labrador	4,375	0.9%	
Prince Edward Island	2,415	1.7%	
Yukon	905	2.6%	
Northwest Territories	560	1.4%	
Nunavut	160	0.5%	
Canada	474,805	1.4%	

== Welsh language ==
In Alberta, there are Welsh language seminars in person and online.

=== Notable people ===
==== Actors ====
- Brent Carver
- Boyd Clack
- Sitara Hewitt
- Anna Hopkins
- Gary Jones
- Margot Kidder
- Quinn Lord
- Rachel McAdams
- Bryn McAuley
- Chris Owens
- Patricia Owens
- Dave Thomas
- Fay Wray

==== Authors ====
- Jessica J. Lee

==== Business ====
- Terry Matthews
- Frederick Orr-Lewis
- Ben Price

==== Criminals ====
- Brett Gardiner

==== Explorers ====
- David Thompson

==== Military ====
- Raymond Collishaw

==== Musicians ====
- Bynon
- Elio
- Heather Dale
- Lights
- Nancy Martinez

==== Politics ====
- Niki Ashton
- Steve Ashton
- Les Benjamin
- Benjamin Davies
- Louis Henry Davies
- Rupert Davies
- Gary Doer
- Ernie Jones
- John Lewis
- Leslie Morris
- Erik Nielsen
- William Owens
- Evan John Price

==== Sports ====
===== Basketball =====
- Steve Nash

===== Curling =====
- Colleen Jones
- Luke Saunders

===== Field Hockey =====
- Andrew Griffiths

===== Ice Hockey =====
- Daryl Evans
- Doug Harvey
- Adam Helewka

===== Rowing =====
- Mark Evans

===== Rugby =====
- Gareth Rees
- Morgan Williams

===== Soccer =====
- Owen Hargreaves
- Jordan Hughes
- Tyler Hughes
- Jamie Knight-Lebel
- Martin Nash
- Keelyn Stewart
- Taegan Stewart
- Rhian Wilkinson

===== Swimming =====
- Mark Andrews

== See also ==
- British Canadians
- Wales
- Welsh (ethnicity)
- Welsh Americans
- Welsh Argentines
