= Watkin Hezekiah Williams =

Welsh schoolmaster and poet (1844–1905)

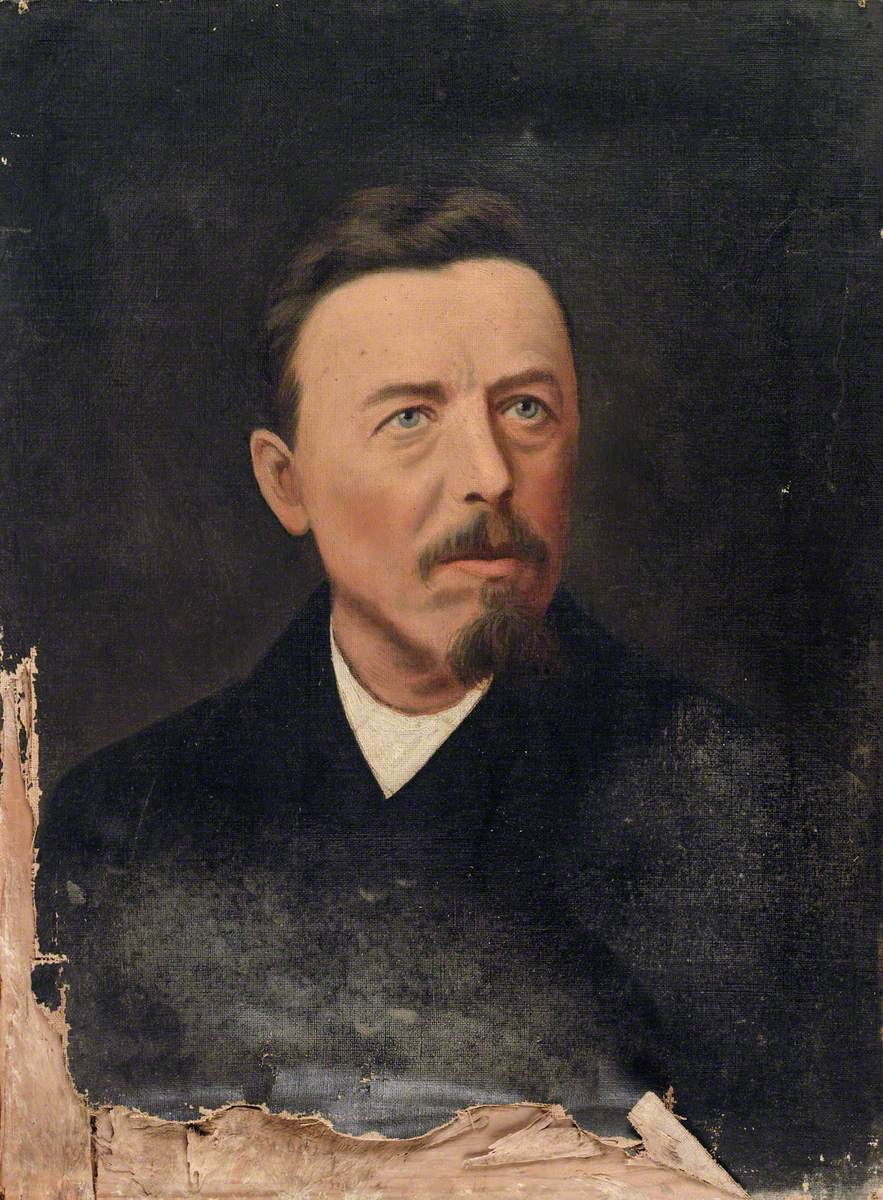
Portrait Watcyn Wyn c.1900

Watkin Hezekiah Williams (7 March 1844 – 19 November 1905), known as Watcyn Wyn, was a Welsh schoolmaster and poet.

== Early life ==
Born on 7 March 1844 at his mother's home at Ddolgam, in the Llynfell valley, Carmarthenshire, was the son of Hezekiah and Ann Williams. He was brought up, the second of a family of ten, on his father's farm of Cwmgarw Ganol, near Brynaman. At an early age he found employment in the coal mines then being opened up in the district, and he worked, chiefly as a collier, with occasional periods of attendance at local schools, until the age of 27.

== Teacher ==
In 1870 Williams married Mary Jones of Trap, Carreg Cennen; the death of his wife in less than a year led him to leave his home and occupation. In January 1872 he entered the school of his relative, Evan Williams of Merthyr. He was soon assisting Evan Williams and his successor, J. J. Copeland. In 1874 he decided to qualify for the independent ministry; he returned home, began to preach at Gibea Chapel, and, after a preliminary training, was admitted to the Presbyterian College at Carmarthen in 1875. On the conclusion of his course in 1879 he married Anne Davies of Carmarthen.

Instead of a pastorate, Williams took a post as teacher of a private school at Llangadog. Differences among the staff led to his moving, with the Rev. D. E. Williams, to Ammanford in 1880, where they founded the Hope Academy. In 1884 Watkin took sole charge, and in 1888 he adapted for school purposes a building to which he gave the name of "Gwynfryn". Until his death he ran the institution as a preparatory school, for those about to enter the dissenting ministry or other professions. He was ordained an independent minister in 1894, but held no pastoral charge.

== Death ==
Williams died on 19 November 1905, and was buried at Ammanford.

== Works ==
As "Watcyn Wyn", Williams had a wide reputation as a Welsh poet, dating from 1875, when he divided a prize with Islwyn at Pwllheli. Both the silver crown and the bardic chair, the two chief poetic prizes of the eisteddfod, were won by him, the former at Merthyr in 1881 for a poem in free metre on "Life", and the latter at Aberdare in 1885 for an ode in the strict metres on the subject "The Truth against the World". He was also the winner of the crown at the World's Fair eisteddfod of 1893 at Chicago, the subject being "George Washington". He published:

- Caneuon Watcyn Wyn, Wrexham, n.d.; second edit. 1873.
- Hwyr Ddifyrion, Swansea, 1883.
- Llenyddiaeth Gymreig (a survey of Welsh literature), Wrexham, 1900.
- Storiau Cymru (versified folk-tales), Wrexham, 1907, and other minor works.

His autobiography Adgofion Watcyn Wyn, edited by John Jenkins (Gwili), appeared, with portrait, in 1907 (Merthyr).

== Notes ==
Attribution

This article incorporates text from a publication now in the public domain: Lee, Sidney, ed. (1912). "Williams, Watkin Hezekiah". Dictionary of National Biography (2nd supplement). Vol. 3. London: Smith, Elder & Co.
