= Welsh history in Chicago =

Over the years Chicago has been called home by many immigrant groups and cultures, the Welsh included.

== The Welsh in the early history of Chicago ==
Thomas Jefferson Vance Owen, whose grandparents were from Wales, is considered "The True Founder of Chicago". He became the first president of the Board of Trustees of Chicago in 1833, and is responsible for sub-dividing the city into sections and towns. In early Chicago history, some of the city's mayors were of close Welsh heritage, including:

- Buckner Stith Morris 1838–1839
- Alexander Loyd 1840–1841
- John P. Hopkins 1893–1895

=== Welsh street names in Chicago ===
Chicago has a few street names which owe their heritage to Wales. They include Berwyn Avenue and Bryn Mawr Avenue. These streets in the city's Edgewater neighborhood were named for stations on the Pennsylvania Railroad's Main Line, located in towns named for Welsh places.

=== Welsh town and city names in Illinois ===
Some Illinois towns are named directly after towns in Wales, for their Welsh founders or prominent Welsh Americans, including: Berwyn, Cambria, Cardiff, Edwardsville, Evanston, St. David & Swansea.

=== The Chicago Eisteddfod of 1893 ===
Aiming to match the grand scale of the World's Fair, the Welsh mounted an International Eisteddfod, a competitive literary and music festival, on the Fair grounds. Choral performances reportedly drew crowds of 6,000 to the Festival Hall. Clara Novello Davies took her Welsh Ladies Choir to Chicago and won the heat for ladies' choirs against competition from Scranton, Wilkes-Barre, Salt Lake City and Ohio.

== Prominent Welsh expatriates in Chicago – past and present ==
- Tony Jones – President of the School of the Art Institute of Chicago from 1986 to 1992 and 1997 to 2007.
- Nicholas Rudall – Head of the Classic Department, University of Chicago (retired 2007).
- Jon Langford – The lead singer of the Chicago-based band The Waco Brothers.
- Elia Einhorn – The lead singer of the Chicago-based band Scotland Yard Gospel Choir.
- Christopher Mander – The Midwest Regional Manager of the Intercontinental hotel chain, a supporter of a number of local charities and was a consultant for the Chicago's 2016 Olympics bid committee. (retired 2008).
- Steve Morgan – Head of foreign media relations for the Barack Obama's 2008 presidential campaign.
- Father Jeremy Thomas – Pastor at St. Jerome Parish in Chicago.
- In 1984, Welsh athlete Steve Jones won the Chicago Marathon, coming in at 2:08:05 and thus breaking the world record of Australian Robert de Castella by 13 seconds.
- Jack Evans (ice hockey) – from Garnant, Wales, played for The Chicago Blackhawks 1958 to 1963.
- Cy Thomas – Dowlais Wales, played for The Chicago Blackhawks 1947/48.
- Wilf Cude – from Barry, played for The Chicago Blackhawks 1931/1932.
- Reverend Elam Davies – The longtime minister of the 4th Presbyterian Church in Chicago. In 1979 Time magazine called him one of the top 7 star preachers in the US.
- David Charles Davies – Originally from Llangeitho was the Director of Chicago's Field Museum of Natural History from December 19, 1921, to July 14, 1928.
- Jenkin Lloyd Jones – Welsh Unitarian minister who founded All Souls Unitarian Church in Chicago, Illinois, as well as its community outreach organization, the Abraham Lincoln Centre.

== Welsh-American Chicagoans ==
Chicagoans of Welsh descent have made their presence known in many arenas of entertainment and public service. To name a few: Secretary of State Senator Hillary Rodham Clinton, comedian and actor Robin Williams, Chicago news reporter and host of 190 North Janet Davies, actress Denise Richards and architect Frank Lloyd Wright.

Chicago Alderman Brian K. Hopkins of the 2nd Ward has Welsh paternal ancestry from both Aberdare, Glamorganshire and Llangurig, Montgomeryshire.

Chicago’s most infamous son of Wales is probably Murray the Hump, Al Capone’s chief lieutenant. Once America’s Public Enemy Number One, he was born in Chicago to Welsh parents from Llanidloes, Mid-Wales.

== Present Welsh ties ==
Expatriated Welshmen continue to contribute to Chicago’s culture. Chicago is also home to three Welsh societies: The Chicago Tafia Welsh Society, The Welsh Women’s Club of Illinois and The Cambrian Benevolent Society of Chicago. Welsh musicians often visit Chicago to perform; most recently: The Manic Street Preachers, The Joy Formidable, Marina and the Diamonds, Duffy, The Stereophonics, Jem, Cerys Matthews, Jon Langford, Bryn Terfel, Tom Jones, People in Planes, Future of the Left, Katherine Jenkins, Super Furry Animals, Funeral for a Friend, Goldie Lookin Chain, Here Be Dragons, David Llewellyn, Julian Jones & The Brit Bus Tour, numerous Welsh male voice choirs, and authors Niall Griffiths, Fflur Dafydd, Aeronwy Thomas, and Janet Quin-Harkin, aka Rhys Bowen.

In 2007 the Illinois General Assembly signed into law Bill HR0149 that proclaimed March 1, 2007, and each year thereafter, as St. David's Day in the State of Illinois and recognizing the Welsh contribution to the state.

In 2008 Chicago was chosen as the host city for the North American Festival of Wales, the largest Welsh festival in North America.

On Saturday June 6, 2009 the United States national rugby union team played Wales in an international friendly at Toyota Park in Bridgeview, Illinois.

Since 2009, Chicago's iconic Wrigley Building has been illuminated on March 1 in the Welsh national colours (white, red & green) to honour St. David's Day.

On Sunday June 6, 2010 the cult independent Welsh film A Bit of Tom Jones? received its North American premiere in Chicago.

On March 1, 2018, four Chicago area buildings (The Wrigley Building, Two Prudential Plaza, The InterContinental Hotel and the Ferris Wheel at Navy Pier) illuminated red, white & green to celebrate St. David's Day.

In 2019, members of The Chicago Tafia Welsh Society partnered with the Pleasant House Pub in Pilsen to paint a Cofiwch Dryweryn mural inside the pub. The mural has been featured in a Cofiwch Dryweryn book by Y Lolfa and in a documentary by S4C.

St. David's Episcopal Church in suburban Aurora contains a cornerstone of gray Cambrian limestone, shipped from St Davids Cathedral in Wales, which was laid and sealed on the eve of Saint David’s Day, February 28, 1959. A box inside the cornerstone holds, among other items, a note from the stonedresser in Pembrokeshire, Wales.

== See also ==
- Chicago Welsh Societies
