= Locations in the United States with a Welsh name =

This is list of locations in the United States named after places in Wales. A number of places in the U.S have been named after places in Wales by Welsh settlers and explorers. and are mainly in the 13 eastern states which used to be the Thirteen Colonies in the British Empire. A number of US towns such as Newport and Newtown maybe named after the similarly named Welsh towns or may have been named solely because of their location. Only those places where there is an evidential link with Wales are included here.

- Bala Cynwyd, Pennsylvania named after Bala, Gwynedd
- Berwyn Township, Custer County, Nebraska named after Berwyn
- Berwyn Heights, Maryland
- Berwyn, Illinois
- Berwyn, Nebraska
- Berwyn, Pennsylvania
- Bangor, Alabama
- Bangor, Maine named after Bangor, Gwynedd
- Bryn Mawr, California named after Brynmawr
- Bryn Mawr, Chicago, Illinois
- Bryn Mawr, Minneapolis
- Bryn Mawr, Pennsylvania
- Bryn Mawr, Raleigh
- Bryn Mawr-Skyway, Washington
- Caernarvon Township, Berks County, Pennsylvania named after Caernarfon
- Caernarvon, Louisiana
- Dillwyn, Virginia
- Havertown, Pennsylvania named after Haverfordwest
- Cardiff, New York named after Cardiff
- Flint, Michigan named after Fflint
- Lampeter, Pennsylvania named after Lampeter
- Lower Gwynedd Township, Montgomery County, Pennsylvania named after Gwynedd
- Montgomery, Illinois
- Montgomery, Iowa
- Montgomery, Kentucky
- Montgomery, Louisiana
- Montgomery, Massachusetts
- Montgomery, Michigan
- Montgomery, Minnesota
- Montgomery, New York
- Montgomery County, New York
- Montgomery, Ohio
- Montgomery, Pennsylvania
- Montgomery, Tennessee
- Montgomery, Texas
- Montgomery, Vermont
- Montgomery, West Virginia
- Montgomery City, Missouri
- Montgomery Creek, California
- Montgomery Village, Maryland
- Narberth, Pennsylvania
- Pembrey, Delaware named after Pembrey
- Pembroke, Massachusetts, named after Pembroke, Wales
- Radnor, Indiana named after Radnorshire
- Radnor, Pennsylvania
- Radnor Township, Delaware County, Pennsylvania
- Radnor, Ohio
- Swansea, Arizona
- Swansea, California
- Swansea, Massachusetts named after Swansea
- Upper Gwynedd Township, Montgomery County, Pennsylvania
- Wales, Alaska
- Wales, Maine
- Wales, Massachusetts
- Wales Township, Michigan
- Wales, New York
- Wales, North Dakota
- Wales, Utah
- Wales, Wisconsin
