= Cardiff City (disambiguation) =

Cardiff City F.C. (commonly referred to as just Cardiff City) is a professional association football club based in Cardiff, Wales.

Cardiff City may also refer to:

- Cardiff, the capital of and most-populated city in Wales
- Cardiff city centre, centre and central business district of Cardiff
- Cardiff City Council, governing body and county council of Cardiff
- Cardiff City F.C. (women), women's football club based in Cardiff and women's section of Cardiff City F.C.
- Cardiff City Ladies F.C., Welsh women's association football club based in Cardiff with no relation to Cardiff City F.C.
- Cardiff City Stadium, home stadium of Cardiff City and the Wales national football team

== See also ==
- Cardiff (disambiguation)
