= Breton Canadians =

Breton Canadians Canadiens d'origine bretonne Breizhiz-Kanadiz
Total population
- 11,845 (2016 Census)

Regions with significant populations
- Atlantic Canada · Quebec

Languages
- French · Breton · English

Religion
- Roman Catholicism, Druidry

Related ethnic groups
- Bretons · French Canadians · Welsh Canadians · Cornish Canadians

Breton Canadians are Canadian citizens of Breton descent or a Brittany-born person who resides in Canada.

According to the 2016 Census, 11,845 Canadians claimed that they had full or partial Breton ancestry. However, the Amicale des Parents d'Émigrés d'Amérique du Nord (Association of Relatives of Emigrants to North America), an organisation headquartered in Gourin, Brittany, has estimated that around 45,000 Bretons immigrated to Canada between the years of 1870 and 1980 and that 8,000 Breton Canadians live or work in the Montreal area. Moreover, many of the settlers during the French colonial era would hail from Brittany.

== See also ==
- French Canadians
- Breton people
- Breton Americans
