= Cornish Canadians =

Canadians of Cornish descent

Cornish Canadians Canadien cornouallais
Kernowyon-Kanadyoryon
- (Cornwall) (Canada)

Total population
- 20,000+

Regions with significant populations
- The Maritimes, Ontario and British Columbia

Languages
- Canadian English, French and Cornish

Religion
- Protestantism, Roman Catholicism

Related ethnic groups
- Cornish, English Canadians, Welsh Canadians, Breton Canadians

Cornish Canadians are Canadians of Cornish descent, including those who were born in Cornwall. The number of Canadian citizens of Cornish descent cannot be determined through census statistics, though speculative estimates place the population as high as 20,000.

== History ==
=== Early arrivals ===
It is recorded that the first Cornish to reach what is now Canadian soil did in the 16th century, reaching the coast of Newfoundland, part of the province of Newfoundland and Labrador.

=== Bruce Mines ===
Cornish emigrants settled the area around Bruce Mines starting in 1842. Located on the north shore of Lake Huron, the area had been associated with the native copper used by indigenous people, whose copper working in the upper Great Lakes dates back to the Old Copper complex. With the spread of knowledge of copper in the area among Europeans, a copper mine opened in 1846, with many local Cornish settlers being recruited to work there. This was the first copper mine in Canada.

Around this time, there was a depression in the Cornish mining industry, which contributed to the volume of people participating in the Cornish "Great Migration", the outflow of emigrants primarily to English-speaking colonies such as Canada and Australia. In 1848, a barque carrying fifty Cornish emigrants, mostly from the Hayle area, along with a stationary steam engine (built in a foundry at Copperhouse) and assortment of Cornish ore processing equipment, left the Port of Hayle bound for Montreal. The arrival of Cornish skilled workers and industrial equipment allowed the owners of the Bruce Mines to rapidly scale up mechanization of their operations.

== Notable people ==
- Frank Andrews (1854-1924), member of the Nova Scotia House of Assembly
- Elizabeth Arden (1878-1966), businesswoman
- Arthur James Bater (1889-1969), MP for The Battlefords
- Truman Smith Baxter (1867-1931), mayor of Vancouver
- Rick Blight (1955-2005), hockey player
- Marie Bottrell (born 1961), country music singer
- Stephen Bosustow (1911-1981), film producer
- Frederick Buscombe (1862-1938), Mayor of Vancouver
- Dick Cherry (1937-2025), hockey player
- Don Cherry (born 1934), hockey player and commentator
- Dean Chynoweth (born 1968), hockey player
- Ed Chynoweth (1941-2008), hockey owner
- H. P. P. Crease (1823-1905), member of the British Columbia Supreme Court
- William Dennis (1856-1920), member of the Senate of Canada
- Claude Ernest Dolman (1906-1994), scientist
- John Eyre (1824-1871), member of the Ontario Legislative Assembly
- Thomas Greenway (1838-1908), Premier of Manitoba
- Wilfred Grenfell (1865-1940), Episcopal missionary
- W.O. Hamley (1818-1907), civil and naval officer
- Derek Holman (1931-2019), composer
- Arthur Lobb (1871-1928), member of the Manitoba Legislative Assembly
- Samuel A. Mitchell (1874-1960), astronomer
- R. J. M. Parker (1881-1948), Lieutenant Governor of Saskatchewan
- Robert Parkyn (1862-1939), member of the Alberta Legislative Assembly
- James Pascoe (1863-1931), member of the Saskatchewan Legislative Assembly
- J. Ernest Pascoe (1900-1972), Member of Parliament for Moose Jaw—Lake Centre
- Nigel Pengelly (1925-2010), member of the Alberta Legislative Assembly
- Robert Terrill Rundle (1811-1896), Methodist missionary
- John Teague (1833-1902), architect and mayor of Victoria
- Francis W. Thomas (1834-1900), banker and philanthropist
- John Tucker Williams (1789-1854), naval officer
- Victor Williams (1867-1949), general
- James Yeo. Sr. (1789-1868), member of the Prince Edward Island Legislative Assembly
- James Yeo, Jr. (1827-1903), Member of Parliament for Prince County
- John Yeo (1837-1924), Member of Parliament for East Prince

== See also ==
- English Canadian
- Cornish people#Canada
