= Bangorville, Ohio =

Unincorporated community in Ohio, U.S.

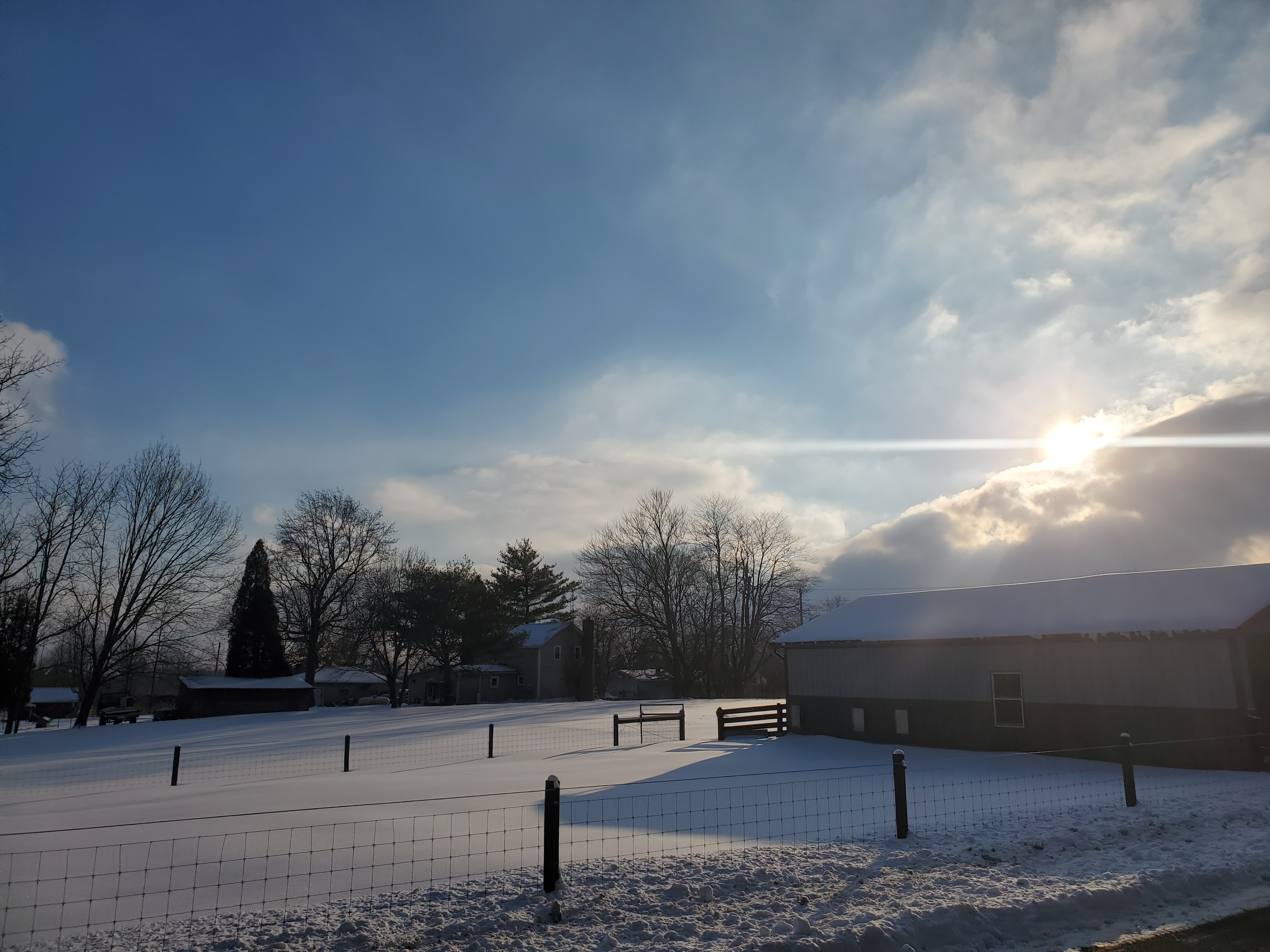
- Bangorville in 2022
- Interactive map of Bangorville, Ohio
- Coordinates: 40°33′54″N 082°33′51″W
- Country: United States
- State: Ohio
- County: Richland County
- Township: Jefferson Township
- Elevation: 1,375 ft (419 m)
- GNIS feature ID: 1064379

Bangorville is an unincorporated community in southwestern Jefferson Township, Richland County, Ohio. Settlers from Penobscot County, Maine, formed the community in the 1840s, and named it after Bangor, Maine. One of these settlers, William Moore (1815–1889), established a manufacturing plant that made farm implements and machinery, and employed about 50 workers. The factory was destroyed by a fire, and not rebuilt. Bangorville was not served by railroad, which also hindered its growth.

The Bangorville Post Office was open from 1873 to 1901. A meteorological station near Bangorville operated from the 1880s until at least the 1920s. Nearby cemeteries include Baldwin Middlebury (in Knox County, Ohio), and Culp (in Perry Township, Richland County).

== Geography ==
The community is in the vicinity of the intersection of Ohio State Route 546 and Bangorville Road.
