= Cardiff (surname) =

Cardiff is a surname. Notable people with the surname include:

- Craig Cardiff (born 1976), Canadian musician
- Elston Cardiff (1889–1969), Canadian politician
- Gladys Cardiff, American poet
- Jack Cardiff (1914–2009), British cinematographer
- Janet Cardiff (born 1957), Canadian artist
- Jim Cardiff (1944–1987), Canadian ice hockey player
- Murray Cardiff (1934–2013), Canadian politician
- Steve Cardiff (1957–2011), Canadian politician
