= Cardiff South =

Cardiff South may refer to:

== Australia ==
- Cardiff South, New South Wales, a suburb of the City of Lake Macquarie, Australia
- South Cardiff FC, a soccer club based in Cardiff South, Newcastle, Australia

== Wales ==
- Cardiff South (UK Parliament constituency), a former borough constituency (1918–1950)
- Cardiff South and Penarth (UK Parliament constituency), a constituency created in 1983
- Cardiff South and Penarth (Senedd constituency), a former constituency (1999–2026)
- South (Cardiff electoral ward), a former electoral ward
