= Swanzy, Michigan =

- Unincorporated community
- Location within the state of Michigan Swanzy (the United States)
- Coordinates: 46°18′10″N 87°22′27″W
- Country: United States
- State: Michigan
- County: Marquette
- Township: Forsyth
- Elevation: 1,145 ft (349 m)
- Time zone: UTC-5 (Eastern (EST))
  - Summer (DST): UTC-4 (EDT)
- ZIP code(s): 49885 (Skandia)
- Area code: 906
- GNIS feature ID: 1617886

Swanzy is an unincorporated community in Marquette County in the U.S. state of Michigan. The community is located within Forsyth Township. As an unincorporated community, Swanzy has no legally defined boundaries or population statistics of its own.

== History ==
A post office called Swanzy was established in 1889, and remained in operation until it was discontinued in 1905. The community was named after Swanzey, New Hampshire.
