= Cardiff West =

Cardiff West may refer to:

- Cardiff West (Senedd constituency)
- Cardiff West (UK Parliament constituency)
