= Cardiff North =

Cardiff North may refer to:

- Cardiff North (geographical area)
- Cardiff North (UK Parliament constituency)
- Cardiff North (Senedd constituency)
