= Cardiff Central =

Cardiff Central may refer to:

Politics

- Cardiff Central (UK Parliament constituency), 1983–2024 constituency in the UK Parliament.
- Cardiff Central (1918–1950 UK Parliament constituency)
- Cardiff Central (Senedd constituency), constituency in the Senedd.

Transport

- Cardiff Central railway station
- Cardiff Central bus station

Geography

- Cardiff City Centre

Buildings

- Cardiff Central Library
- Central Square, Cardiff
