= Llewelyn, Saskatchewan =

Canadian settlement of Welsh immigrants near Bangor, Saskatchewan

Llewelyn, Saskatchewan was a Canadian settlement of Welsh immigrants near Bangor, Saskatchewan. Many of the initial residents were Patagonian Welsh.

== Origins ==
Llewelyn was founded when the Canadian government helped several dozen Welsh families move from Argentina to Saskatchewan, starting in 1902. A school and a post office were in place by late 1903. By 1906, the Canadian Department of the Interior was confident enough to report that "The Welsh settlement of Llewelyn Saskatchewan, appears to be thriving," mentioning the productive farms and four school houses at Llewelyn.

== Llewelyn Bethel Chapel ==
Llewelyn Bethel Chapel was built in 1910, to serve recent Welsh immigrants. Regular Welsh-language services continued at Bethel until 1936.

== Oral history ==
An oral history of the Patagonian Welsh near Bangor was conducted by Glenys James in 1974. The tapes from those interviews are held by the National Screen and Sound Archive of Wales in Aberystwyth, and many were used in the making of Lleisiau Patagonia 1902, a 2015 BBC television documentary.
