= Welsh National Gymanfa Ganu Association =

The Welsh National Gymanfa Ganu Association, also known as WNGGA, was founded in 1929, after the first Cymanfa Ganu in North America was held on a field on Goat Island, located in the Niagara Reservation State Park in Niagara Falls, New York. The Welsh National Gymanfa Ganu Association is responsible for overseeing the Cymanfaoedd Ganu held in North America.

== History ==
The Gymanfa Ganu at Niagara Falls was the first National Gymanfa Ganu (Guh-mahn'-va Gahn'-ee) to be held in the United States. Although exact estimates are unknown, it is believed that 3,000 were in attendance. The Welsh Americans of Youngstown, Ohio are generally given the majority of credit for helping to perpetuate this movement. However, there were many others involved in the planning for the event. Delegations from Ohio, Pennsylvania, New York and Michigan, traveling by train and auto to Niagara Falls, were joined there by equally enthusiastic Welsh from Ontario. After the success of the first Gymanfa Ganu, plans were already being made for another Gymanfa at Niagara Falls the following year. An organizational structure was put into place with Will Lewis (Youngstown, Ohio) as President; Ellis Hughes (Niagara Falls, New York) as Vice President; Dave Lewis (Youngstown, Ohio) as Secretary; and W. B. Jones (Pittsburgh, Pennsylvania) as Treasurer. This was the beginning of what has been known as the "Welsh National Gymanfa Ganu Association", renamed in 2011 to "Welsh North American Association" or WNAA.

This change was adopted at the September 3, 2011, Annual General Meeting of The Welsh National Gymanfa Ganu Association, in Cleveland, Ohio, in recognition of the broadened mission of the organization. This mission is stated as "to preserve, develop and promote our Welsh cultural heritage including, but not limited to, the Gymanfa Ganu, literature, cultural traditions..." (see Official Website link below)

With the exception of three years during World War II (1943–1945), a Gymanfa Ganu (commonly just referred to as a National) has been held in North America every year since 1929. In 1969 the Gymanfa was held in Cardiff, and in 1974 in Swansea, both in Wales (there were two Nationals held in North America in each of those two years, but both are not included in the official count).

The Board of Trustees of the WNGGA is the unifying force that provides the institutional memory, selects sites for the annual cymanfaoedd, provides general guidance and supervision, and assures that desired cultural and religious standards are maintained. Following suspension of the national cymanfaoedd during the war years of 1943-45, it was the Board of the WNGGA that made sure the national Gymanfa Ganu was reactivated and has continued since as the preeminent expression of Welsh culture, heritage, and the Welsh language in the United States and Canada.
