= Chicago Tafia =

Expatriate Welsh group in Illinois, US

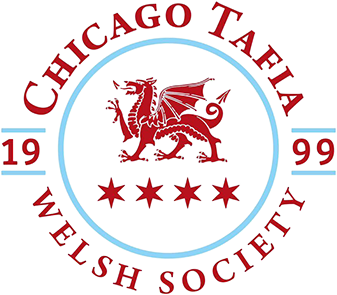
Chicago Tafia logo

The Chicago Tafia Welsh Society (also known as the Chicago Tafia) is an expatriate Welsh group formed in Chicago, Illinois, USA, in 1999. As one of the youngest and most contemporary Welsh groups in North America, the society strives to provide a link between the present culture of Wales and the Chicago area.

== Activities ==
The group's activities include organizing social gatherings to watch Welsh sporting events and musicians, and celebrating events such as St. David's Day. Over the years they have been involved with over a dozen concerts for Welsh male voice choirs in the Chicago area, including the Pendyrus, Penrhyn, Bangor, Black Mountain, Burlington, Hogia'r Ddwylan and CF1 choirs at prominent Chicago venues. When Welsh musicians visit Chicago, the society endeavours to get them to sign a Welsh flag, the Tafia Flag of Fame. This has been a tradition since 2002. Signatures have included those of Bryn Terfel, Tom Jones, Cerys Matthews, The Stereophonics, Jem, Eddie Izzard, Marina Diamandis, Gruff Rhys, Jon Langford, The Manic Street Preachers, The Joy Formidable, Aeronwy Thomas, and many other Welsh artists.

In 2007 the group attracted the former lead singer of Catatonia, Cerys Matthews to entertain them at their annual St. David's Day party. In the same year, they successfully lobbied the Illinois General Assembly into signing into law Bill HR0149, which proclaimed March 1, in 2007 and each year thereafter, as St. David's Day in the State of Illinois, in recognition of the Welsh contribution to the state.

From 2009 to 2023 the Chicago Tafia partnered with the owners of the Wrigley Building, Prudential Plaza, and other iconic Chicago buildings to illuminate the skyline red, white, and green (the colours of the Welsh flag) on March 1, St. Davids Day.

In 2014 members of the Chicago Tafia started the Chicago Swansea City Supporters Club, that meets for games at Chicago area pubs.

In April 2019, following the vandalism of the Cofiwch Dryweryn mural in Llanrhystud, Wales, the Chicago Tafia partnered with the Pleasant House pub to create a tribute mural in Chicago, which has since been featured in the Cofiwch Dryweryn book published by Y Lolfa, and in an S4C documentary.

== Newspaper, Magazine & Web articles about the Chicago Tafia ==
- The untold story of the rise and tragic fall of a US mining town called Cardiff.
- Chicago lights up in colours of Welsh flag for St David's Day
- Tribute to Cofiwch Dryweryn mural seen in Chicago pub
- Cofiwch Dryweryn message spread as far as Chicago
- A Cofiwch Dryweryn wall has appeared in an American city
- Bramley, Anne (February 27, 2015). "Leeks, Cawl, and Cakes: Welsh Traditions for St. David's Day". Paste.
- Chicago Sun Times - Dylan Thomas at 100: "just one of the boys" (October 2014)
- Anglophenia - British Expat of the Month: Dave Parry of Chicago Tafia (January 2014)
- Patch - Homewood’s Cheekiest Resident Named British Expat of the Month (January 2014)
- Wales Online - Dylan Thomas: Centenary celebrations in overdrive at home and abroad (February 2014)
- Wales Online - Ten ways Wales punches above its weight on the global stage (March 2013)
- The Loyola Phoenix - Closer Look gets a glimpse of the 13th annual Chicago Celtic Fest (September 22, 2009)
- Annual kilt contest skirts the issue - The Chicago Tafia in the Chicago Sun Times 11 September 2009
- Wrigley Building Lit in Welsh Colours for St. David's Day 2009
- BBC.co.uk - Wales and the World Honour St. David
- An interview by the London Welsh with the Chicago Tafia
- BBC Wales - 28 February 2007
- BBC Wales - 24 September 2004

== See also ==
- Welsh History in Chicago
- Welsh American
