= Cymanfa Ganu =

Welsh sacred hymn festival

A Cymanfa Ganu (Note: Gymanfa Ganu is sometimes used, due to the complexities of consonant mutation in the Welsh language. This leads to the initial ⟨c⟩ being mutated to a ⟨g⟩ when preceded by the Welsh word for the. The Welsh plural is Cymanfaoedd Canu. Further explanation of this linguistic process is available at: Literary Welsh morphology § Initial consonant mutation and Colloquial Welsh morphology § Initial consonant mutation.) (Welsh pronunciation: [kəˈmanva ˈɡanɨ], 'singing festival') is a Welsh festival of sacred hymns, sung with four-part harmony by a congregation, usually under the direction of a choral director.

The Cymanfa Ganu movement was launched in 1859 at Bethania Chapel in Aberdare, where it was pioneered by the Reverend Evan Lewis.

In Wales, cymanfaoedd canu are held each year in many villages and towns throughout the country. Some have more than one Cymanfa Ganu a year, as often many separate chapels hold their own. Some large annual events occur in some chapels and take place at festivals such as the National Eisteddfod and the Llangollen International Musical Eisteddfod. Some are occasionally held in theatres and concert halls. Cymanfaoedd Canu are held across the world – wherever members of the Welsh diaspora live, significantly in Y Wladfa (Chubut Province, Argentina), e.g. Trelew and Gaiman, where there were significant Welsh settlements from the mid-19th century. In some of these areas Patagonian Welsh is still in daily use, together with Argentine Spanish. Outside of Wales, in the UK there are Cymanfaoedd Canu in London, parts of the West Midlands and other areas where there are still evangelical chapels using the medium of Welsh.

The preservation of the Cymanfa Ganu as a unique feature of Welsh culture is being supported by a number of Welsh cultural associations, such as the New Zealand National Gymanfa Ganu Association and the Welsh North American Association (North America).

== North American Gymanfa Ganu ==
Once a year, a four-day North American Festival of Wales is held in North America over the Labor Day weekend. The festival starts on Thursday night with an opening ceremony and concert. The weekend continues with an evening banquet sponsored by the North America Wales Foundation on Friday and a Saturday concert, generally featuring a Welsh male voice choir and soloists, both from Wales.

Sunday is the defining day of the four-day festival which begins with a bilingual church and memorial service. After a brief intermission, this service is followed by afternoon and evening sessions of the Gymanfa Ganu itself. A unique feature of the gymanfa ganu is the seating separation of alto, soprano, tenor, and bass singers into sections for the four-part harmony singing. And while the Gymanfa Ganu is conducted with the dignity of a church service, it is not unknown for the musical conductor to stop the singing when one or more of the voice sections wanders from the desired harmony and needs special attention.

Interspersed between the formal proceedings are frequent sessions of spontaneous singing of favorite hymns. A Welsh marketplace, offering Welsh products, artifacts, souvenirs, recordings, and books, is also available during the days of the festival. The Welsh North American Association is the main organizational body responsible for putting on the event.

== See also ==
- List of music festivals in the United Kingdom
