= Pembrey, Delaware =

Unincorporated community in Delaware, United States

- Unincorporated community
- Location within Delaware Location within the United States
- Coordinates: 39°48′20″N 75°31′34″W
- Country: United States
- State: Delaware
- County: New Castle
- Elevation: 367 ft (112 m)
- Time zone: UTC-5 (Eastern (EST))
  - Summer (DST): UTC-4 (EDT)
- Area code: 302
- GNIS feature ID: 217117

Pembrey is an unincorporated community in New Castle County, Delaware, United States. Pembrey is located south of Silverside Road and east of Shipley Road, east of Talleyville. Its name is drawn from Pembrey, a village in West Wales in the United Kingdom, which is itself an Anglicized version of Pen-Bre, meaning 'head of the mountain'.
