= Cardiff, New York =

Cardiff Onondaga: Gaeñdó·daʼ
- hamlet
- Location within the state of New York
- Coordinates: 42°53′23″N 76°8′36″W
- Country: United States
- State: New York
- County: Onondaga
- Time zone: UTC-5 (Eastern (EST))
  - Summer (DST): UTC-4 (EDT)

Cardiff is a hamlet in Onondaga County, New York, United States, located south of Syracuse. It was named after Cardiff, the capital of Wales. It is known as Gaeñdó·daʼ in the indigenous Onondaga language.

It was the site of the William C. "Stub" Newell farm where the "Cardiff Giant", a famous hoax, was "discovered" on October 16, 1869.
