= Cardiff, Illinois =

Ghost town in Illinois, United States

Coordinates: 41°03′06″N 88°17′14″W

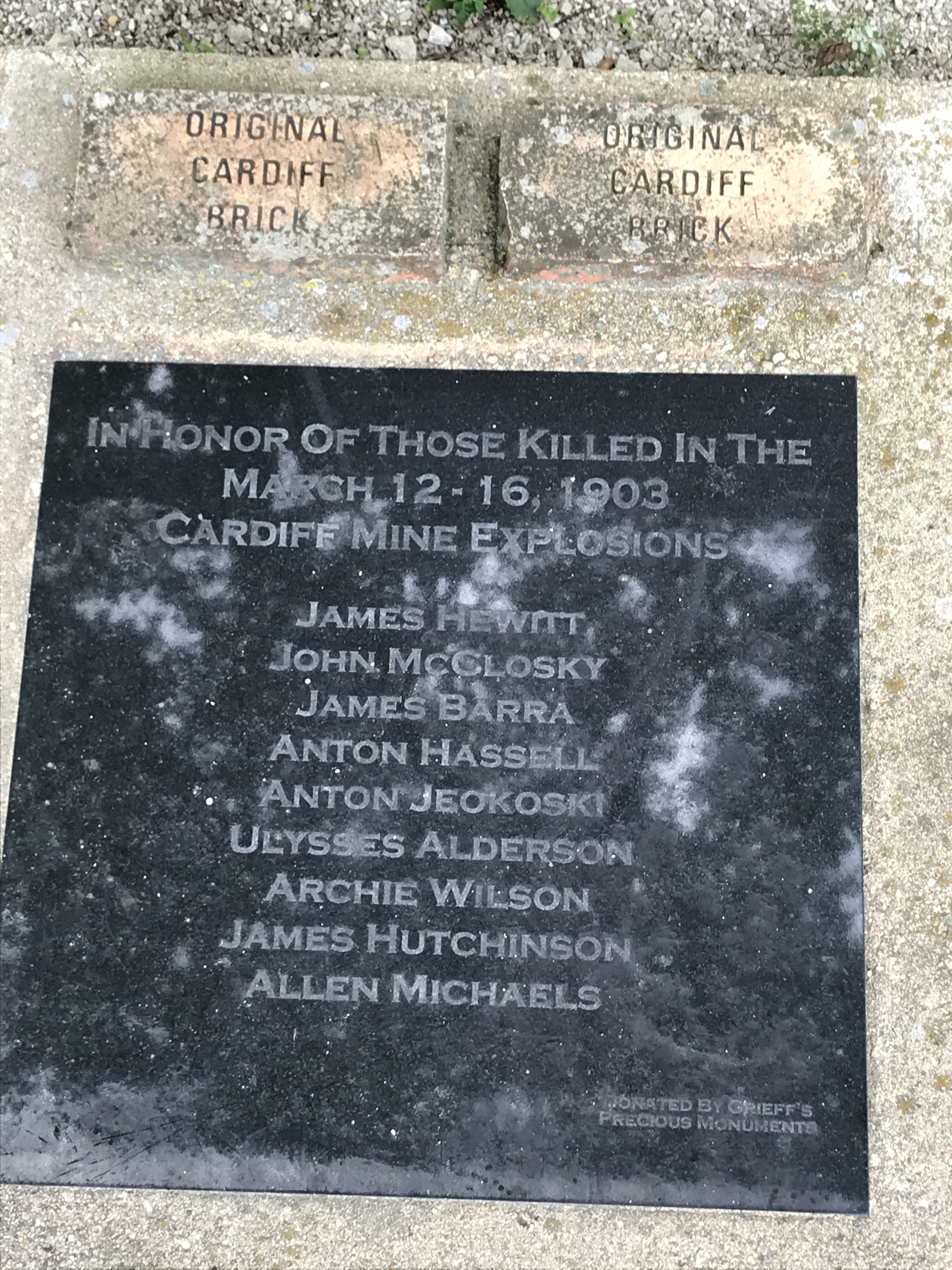
Monument to the men who died in the Cardiff mine explosions

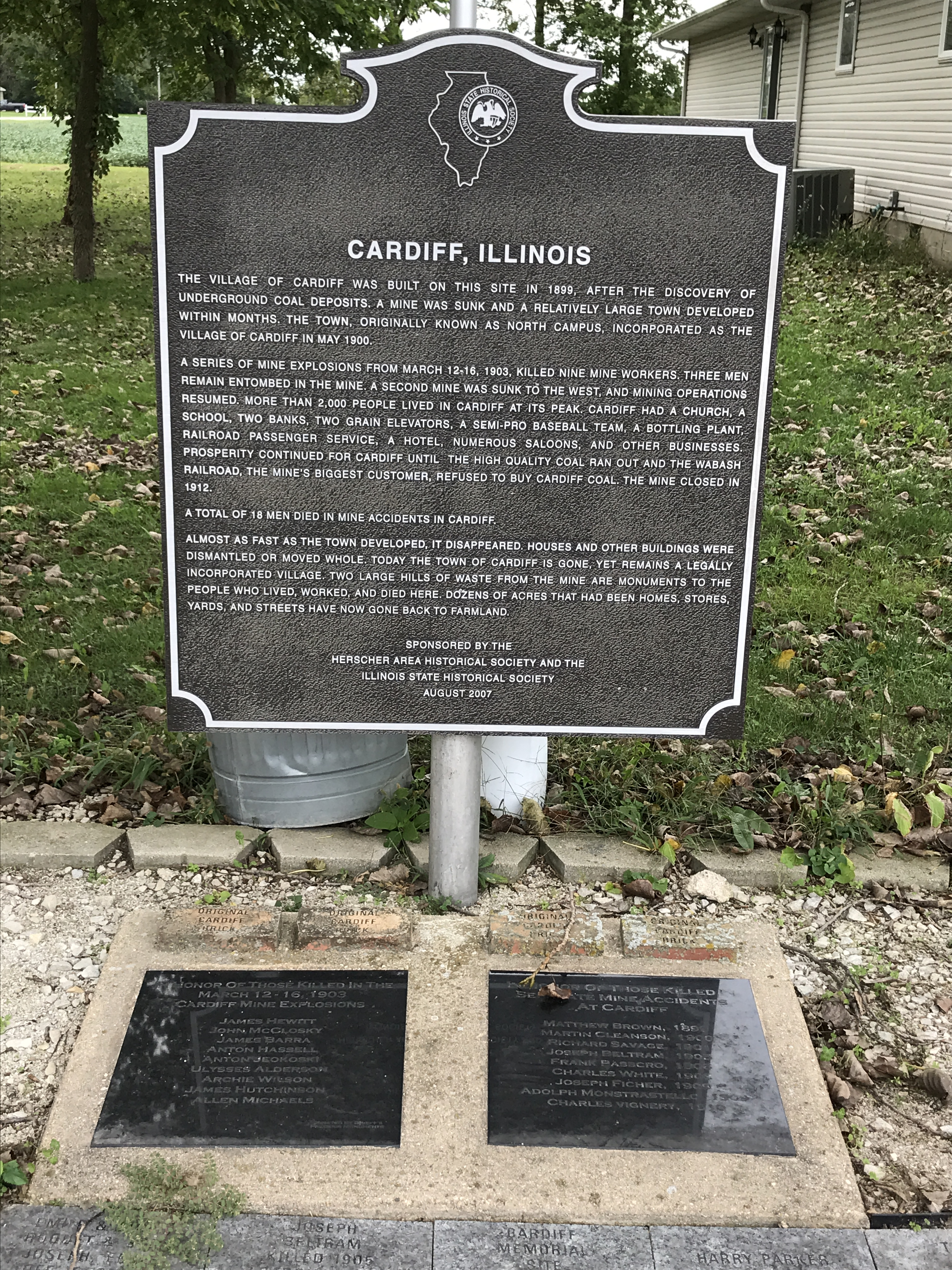
Monument in Cardiff, Illinois

Cardiff is a ghost town in Livingston County, Illinois, United States. Founded as a coal mining town in 1899, it boomed in its first few years. The closure of the mine in 1912 soon led to the community's demise. It is located in Round Grove Township, between the villages of Campus and Reddick.

Prior to the arrival of the mine and town of Cardiff, the area was known as Collopy's Corners. It was farm land owned by Patrick Collopy and his wife Ann. Collopy had purchased his first 40 acres there in April 1899 for $1000. The rural intersection, which would become Wabash and Main Streets in Cardiff, was “the corners.”

The White Breast Fuel Coal Company arrived in the area in 1899 looking to start a coal mine near the village of Campus. After meeting resistance from many of the people in Campus, the coal company purchased land from Patrick Collopy in May 1899 for $7,660.

Ground was broken for the new mine on May 6, 1899. Coal was found at a depth of 250 feet. The White Breast Fuel Coal Co. named its subsidiary the Campus Coal Co. And for the first four months of developing the mine site in 1899, the area was known as North Campus.

Fred E. Ahern, who owned farmland adjacent to the mine site, was one of the first men to recognize the opportunity. By the end of 1899, he was selling lots in the new town and had built a house on a corner lot.

The mine was built in the first half of 1899 and in June miners started blasting rock and removing clay from the surface. A railroad spur was extended two miles north from the Wabash Railroad in Campus to the mine site.

On September 1, 1899, the town was officially named Cardiff after one of the richest coal mining areas in the world - Cardiff, Wales. The name of the company was changed to the Cardiff Coal Company. Charles I. Pierce was president of the company and Joseph M. Blee was secretary and assistant auditor. By mid-September, coal was being hauled to Dwight, Illinois. Between 175 and 200 people were working at Cardiff.

Cardiff's 17,000-bushel grain elevator opened on October 2, 1899. Farmers lined up for a quarter mile in all four directions bringing in their grain to the elevator.

By mid-October 1899, 50 tons of coal per day was being taken from the mine. That number increased to 100 tons by November and 200 tons by December. Men from Braceville, Clarke City and Coal City came to work at the mine.

A number of homes were quickly built for the workers. The Hotel DeWelcome was built on the north end of town and in 1900 the Hotel Cardiff opened. One of the biggest stores in town was the Livingston Supply Co., the company store.

A schoolhouse was completed in December 1899. Miss Bronson was hired as the teacher and about 40 children began school in January 1900. The first church service also started in January, when Rev. Brothers of Reddick started preaching and teaching Sunday School in the new schoolhouse.

The village of Cardiff was officially incorporated on Thursday, May 24, 1900. The first election was held June 19, 1900 and Frank Milem was elected mayor.

Schlitz Brewing Co. had a large presence in Cardiff. It put up a building on the corner of Main Street and Morris Avenue in 1900. Schlitz put up a second building in 1902 at the corner of Ahern Street and Wabash Avenue. The first building was used for cold storage and the second was used for retail beer sales. In 1904 Schlitz built a two-story building which was advertised as “one of the finest saloons between Chicago and St. Louis.”

As the mine developed into a big business, the village continued to grow. By January 1903 there were 400 miners bringing up 1,200 to 1,600 tons of coal per day, and the company was still not able to meet the demand for its coal. The village had a population of over 2,000 people.

And then disaster struck. Around midnight on Thursday, March 12, 1903, an explosion in the mine sent a huge blast of air that blew three miners against the shaft wall, killing them. The huge explosion shook the town and awakened most of the residents. Flames and debris shot up more than 100 feet from the mine opening.

Rescuers were able to get the dead and all the injured out of the mine near five in the morning on Friday. Funerals for the three victims were held in Cardiff on Sunday. Those killed were Charles Joseph Hewitt, 23, a single man; John McClosky, 23, who had a wife and one child; and James Barra, 41, who had a wife and four children.

On that same Sunday morning, a crew of six men were in the mine cleaning up debris from the explosion. Shortly after the funerals were finished, a second mine explosion occurred. Five of the six men working were killed. Those killed were Anton Hassell, 38, who had a wife and three children; Anton Jeokoski, 23, a single man; Ulysses Alderson, 23, who left a wife and two children; Archie Wilson, 51, who had a wife and seven children; and James Hutchinson, 51, who left a widow and eight children.

A third explosion occurred on Monday just before another crew was going to go in for repairs. This was the largest blast of the three, blowing out the top of the mine shaft and damaging machinery, the tower house, and the engine house. Company carpenter Allen Michaels was looking down the shaft when it exploded and was killed.

Two more explosions occurred over the next couple of days. No one else was hurt. The toll in the five explosions was nine dead and thirteen injured. The cause of the explosion was never determined although it was likely due to a gas explosion.

The mine was a total loss. It was estimated at a $100,000 loss by the company. The disaster looked as if it would spell doom for Cardiff.

However, shortly after the devastating explosions the Cardiff Coal Co. announced that they would sink a new mine shaft nearby. Work began in April 1903 and the first coal was brought up from the new mine on Sunday, June 7, 1903.

Within a few years, Cardiff grew even larger. The mine employed about 500 miners, and the population of the town was estimated to be 2,000 to 2,500 people. The town had two banks, two grain elevators, a soft-drink bottling plant, a candy factory and at least two dance halls. There were businesses such as clothing stores, two meat markets, two bakeries, several barber shops, a millinery shop, two livery stables, several general stores, a pharmacy, two blacksmith shops, two ice houses, and a real estate and insurance office. It even had an automobile dealership at the time when automobiles were just becoming available.

The town had pressurized water system, a gas works system, and an electric light plant. There was a railroad depot, and two railroad lines with passenger service. It had a first class hotel with fine cuisine. There was a doctor's office and a post office.

The peak of the mine and Cardiff were the years of 1907 and 1908. In 1907 a total of 216,781 tons of coal was mined and in 1908, a total of 216,987 tons was mined.

Then a different type of disaster struck. In 1910 the Wabash Railroad, which was the largest customer of Cardiff Coal Co., announced that it would no longer purchase Cardiff coal. The quality of coal had declined to where it no longer met the requirements of the railroad's steam engines. Without Wabash, the profitability of the mine suffered dramatically and soon it became clear that the mine would eventually have to close.

The Cardiff mine officially closed September 21, 1912. People quickly left the town and most of the remaining businesses closed. Most of the houses were dismantled and moved to nearby towns and farms where they were reassembled. Cardiff Coal Company's property was sold at a public auction on September 2, 1916.

By 1920 the population of Cardiff was down to 152. The 1927 telephone book listed two businesses and only three people with telephones.

In 1983 a state reclamation project had slack taken off the large hill created from mining operations and used it to fill in the mine shafts. Slack is the mixture of coal fragments, coal dust and dirt that remains after screening coal. The concrete abutments at the mine site were also removed. There were two ponds where coal was washed after it was dug for the mines. These ponds have mostly been filled in and become overgrown.

Today all that is left of Cardiff are a few remnants of cracked sidewalks and of course the large slag hill of waste from the second mine and a smaller hill above the first mine. There are just a few houses and trailers along a rural road in the area. What was once called Cardiff is all gone.
