= Edwyn Cynrig Roberts =

Welsh pioneer of Patagonia

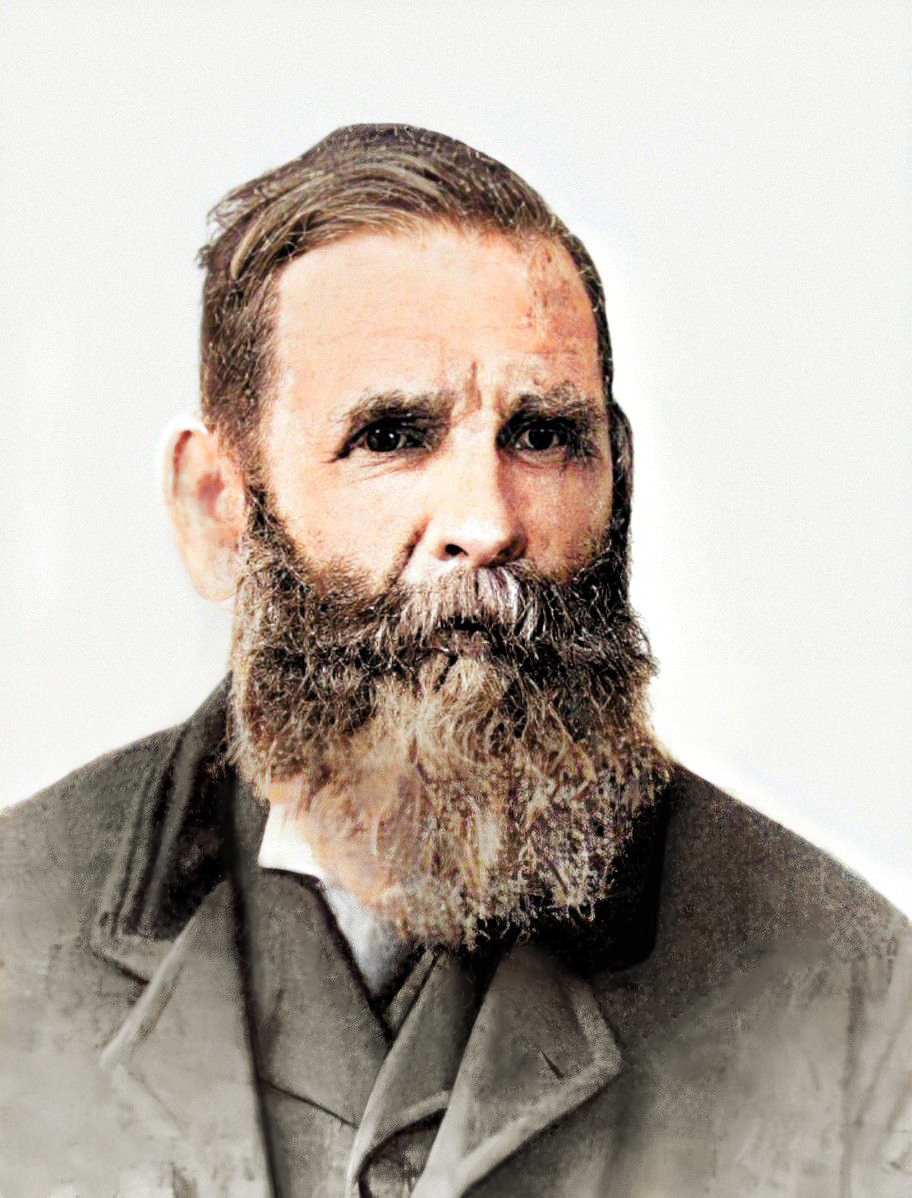
Edwyn Cynrig Roberts

Edwyn Cynrig Roberts, sometimes Edwin Cynrig Roberts (1838 - 17 September 1893) was one of the pioneers of the Welsh settlement in Patagonia, Argentina.

Edwin Roberts was born at Y Bryn in the village of Cilcain, Flintshire, the son of John and Mary Kendrick, but emigrated with his family to Wisconsin in 1847. A Welsh Colonial Movement began around 1856 in the United States, where some of the Welsh settlers saw that their fellow countrymen were losing their language and culture and becoming Americans. Roberts became prominent within the movement there, and when it became clear that arrangements for a group of Welsh Americans to travel to Patagonia would not proceed, he planned to emigrate there on his own.

He was persuaded to travel to Wales to look for others who are willing to emigrate to Patagonia, and came into contact with Michael D. Jones. He traveled through Wales to give talks on the subject, and became a part of the Liverpool Emigration Society, formed in Liverpool in 1861 to organize the venture. In May 1865, approximately 160 Welshmen left their country by sailing from Liverpool to Porth Madryn, (now Puerto Madryn) in Patagonia on the ship Mimosa. They reached Porth Madryn on 28 July and Lewis Jones and Edwyn Roberts were there ready to meet them.

Unlike most of the Welsh emigrants to Patagonia, who were Nonconformists, Roberts was an Anglican.

In 1866, he married Anne Jones, a passenger on the Mimosa. Later, he and several companions went in search of gold in the Andes. They found some, and Edwyn Roberts visited Wales to try and raise money to form a company to work. He died of a heart attack in Bethesda few days before starting back to Patagonia.

Edwyn Roberts is the hero in Yr Hirdaith (Gomer Press, 1999) by Elvey MacDonald, a descendant of Roberts.
