= Eluned Morgan (author) =

Argentine Welsh-language writer

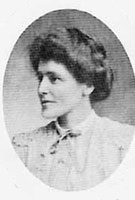
- Born: 20 March 1870; Bay of Biscay, Atlantic Ocean
- Died: 29 December 1938; Y Wladfa, Argentina
- Occupation: Author
- Father: Lewis Jones

Eluned Morgan (20 March 1870 – 29 December 1938) was a Welsh-language Argentinian author from Patagonia. She was raised in Y Wladfa, a Welsh colony in Patagonia, and was taught to speak both Welsh and Spanish. Her father eventually enrolled her in Dr Williams' School in Wales, where she had to learn the English language. She led student protests against the school's English-only policy, which prohibited the use of Welsh by its students.

As a writer, Morgan is primarily remembered for two travel books which described journeys to Patagonia and to the Andes. Her book Dringo'r Andes also covered in detail the relations between different ethnic groups. Otherwise, Morgan is remembered for writing a history of the Incas.

After spending a few decades in Wales, Morgan returned to Patagonia in 1918. She spend the rest of her life there.

== Biography ==
Morgan was born aboard the ship Myfanwy in the Bay of Biscay. The ship was en route from Great Britain to Patagonia in South America. She was the daughter of Lewis Jones who gave his name to the city of Trelew, in Chubut Province, Argentina.

Her father's family name was Jones, but she received the surname Morgan at her christening. She was raised in the Welsh colony of Y Wladfa in Patagonia. She was educated at a Welsh school operated there by Richard Jones Berwyn. She learned to speak Welsh and Spanish, but not English.

Morgan first visited Wales in 1885. In 1888, Morgan was sent by her father, Lewis Jones, from Patagonia to be educated at Dr Williams School in Dolgellau. In the Welsh colony in Patagonia, education was through the medium of Welsh. In Wales itself, English was used in schools due to the demands of the community and the use of Welsh was discouraged, including by the use of the controversial Welsh Not. Eluned arrived in Wales speaking Welsh and Spanish and very little, if any, English. Winnie Ellis, sister of the Meirioneth MP, T. E. Ellis, who would translate for her from English, recalls her as 'walking like a prince'. According to Ellis, Morgan stood out with her dark skin and eyes.

Upon arriving at the school, Morgan led a procession out of the class in protest at the English-only policy and attitude of the school. The dispute was only settled when Michael D. Jones, the founder of the Welsh colony in Patagonia, traveled from Bala to mediate.

Morgan stayed at the School for two years, and finished her education c. 1890. She then returned to the Welsh colony in Patagonia, and started operating a boarding school for girls. The school closed c. 1892.

In 1891, Morgan started her literary career by submitting her essays to the colony's eisteddfod (a literary competition). She competed for the essay prizes. In 1893, Morgan became an editor for the Welsh-language newspaper called Y Drafod, which was founded that year by her father in order to promote Welshness in Y Wladfa. Morgan also helped with the newspaper's composition.

In 1896, Morgan briefly returned to Wales. In 1897, the Welsh periodical Cymru (O.M.E.) started publishing her articles. At the time, she also attempted to establish intermediate school. In 1898, Morgan travelled to the Andes. She wrote down an account of her journey, which was published in Cymru (O.M.E.) from 1899 to 1900.

In 1903, Morgan was hired as an assistant by Cardiff Central Library. She worked there until 1909. During this period, Morgan delivered a series of lectures throughout Wales. She left Wales for a few years to travel the Middle East. Her journey to Ottoman Palestine was described in her book Ar Dir a Môr (1913).

After another stay in Patagonia, Morgan returned to Cardiff in 1912. She lived in the city from 1912 to 1918. She then returned to the Welsh colony in Patagonia, where she lived until her death in 1938. During the last decades of her life, Morgan served as a leader in the religious life of the colony.

== Literary career ==
She wrote numerous articles on Y Wladfa (the Welsh settlement in Patagonia) for Welsh periodicals such as Cymru, edited by Owen Morgan Edwards, but is chiefly remembered for her two travel books, Dringo'r Andes (1904), about a journey across country from the Welsh Settlement to the Andes, and Gwymon y Môr (1909), about a sea voyage from Britain to Patagonia. She also wrote a book on the history of the Incas, Plant yr Haul (1915).

Morgan wrote Dringo'r Andes, an account of early Welsh life in the Patagonian settlement including accounts of the relations between the Welsh, and the indigenous peoples in Argentina (which were good on the whole), the ruling Spaniards, and the immigrant Italians.

== Books ==
- Dringo'r Andes (1. Y Brodyr Owen, Abergavenny, 1904; 2. Southall & Co., Newport, 1907; 3. Southall & Co., 1909; 4. Southall & Co., 1917; 5. Southall & Co. n.d.)
- Gwymon y Môr (Y Brodyr Owen, Abergavenny, 1909)
- Ar Dir a Môr (Y Brodyr Owen, Abergavenny, 1913)
- Plant yr Haul (1. Evans & Williams, Cardiff, 1915; 2. Southall & Co., 1921; 3. Southall & Co., 1926)
