= Elvey MacDonald =

Former head of the Urdd National Eisteddfod

Elvey Jones MacDonald
- Born: 17 June 1941
- Died: 23 November 2022 (aged 81)
- Occupation: Head of the Urdd National Eisteddfod

Elvey Jones MacDonald (17 June 1941 – 23 November 2022) was a native of Y Wladfa that settled in Wales. He worked for the National Eisteddfod of Wales before becoming head of the Urdd National Eisteddfod for 23 years. He also suggested the creation of Radio Ceredigion, which started broadcasting in 1992.

== Biography ==
MacDonald was born in Trelew, Patagonia as the son of Hector MacDonald and his wife Sara. He was raised in Gaiman; his mother was very strongly in favour of the Welsh language and was against hearing any Spanish in the home, so MacDonald and his sister Edith were raised solely in Welsh. He visited Wales for the first time in 1965 - the centennial of the Welsh settlement of Patagonia - with the intention of staying for three years. At the time, he could not speak English; he only spoke Welsh and Spanish.

He stayed in Wales after meeting his future wife, Delyth MacDonald. He moved to Llanrhystud, near Aberystwyth, and was a consistent spokesperson for Welsh Patagonia throughout his life.

== Career ==
MacDonald started his career working in a bank in Trelew. After moving to Wales he became assistant organiser for the National Eisteddfod of Wales in its south office for five years. He was then appointed the role of Head of the Urdd National Eisteddfod, staying in the role between 1974 and 1999.

In 1992, MacDonald founded Radio Ceredigion.

After retirement he mainly promoted Y Wladfa, as well as organising tours for Welsh people visiting Patagonia.

MacDonald wrote Yr Hirdaith, a book describing the history of Y Wladfa and focusing on the life of one of its main settlers, Edwin Cynrig Roberts. He published his autobiography, Llwch, in 2009.

== Personal life ==
MacDonald lived in Llanrhystud. He died on 23 November 2022 at 81 years old. After his death, Urdd Gobaith Cymru paid tribute to MacDonald, saying "his pioneering leadership contributed significantly to the Urdd’s century".
