= Mimosa (ship) =

British clipper ship

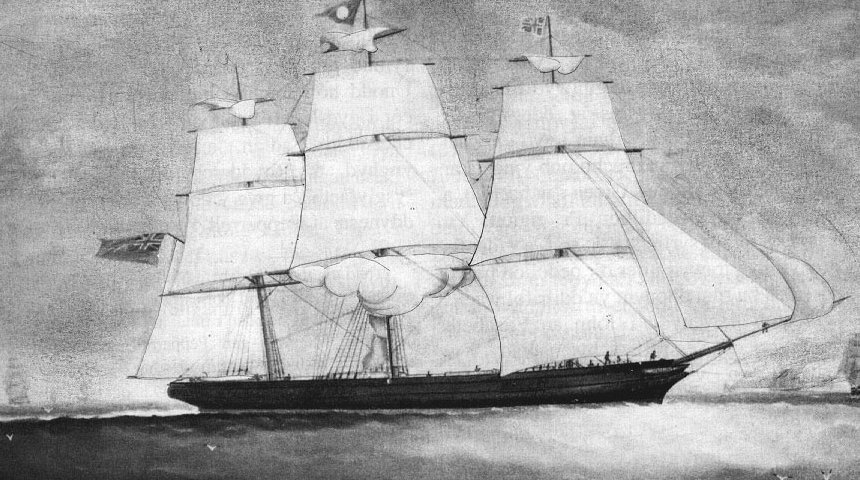

History

United Kingdom
- Name: Mimosa
- Owner: Robert Vining, William Killey, Liverpool; Daniel Green
- Builder: Alexander Hall and Sons, Aberdeen
- Cost: £5,916
- Launched: 21 June 1853
- Fate: Hulked; lost at New Calabar.

General characteristics
- Tons burthen: 447 tons NM, 540 tons OM
- Length: 139.9 ft (42.6 m)
- Beam: 25.5 ft (7.8 m)
- Depth of hold: 15.6 ft (4.8 m)
- Sail plan: Ship rigged, 3 masts

Mimosa was a clipper ship that gained fame for carrying the first Welsh emigrants to Argentina, South America in 1865.

== Voyage to Patagonia ==
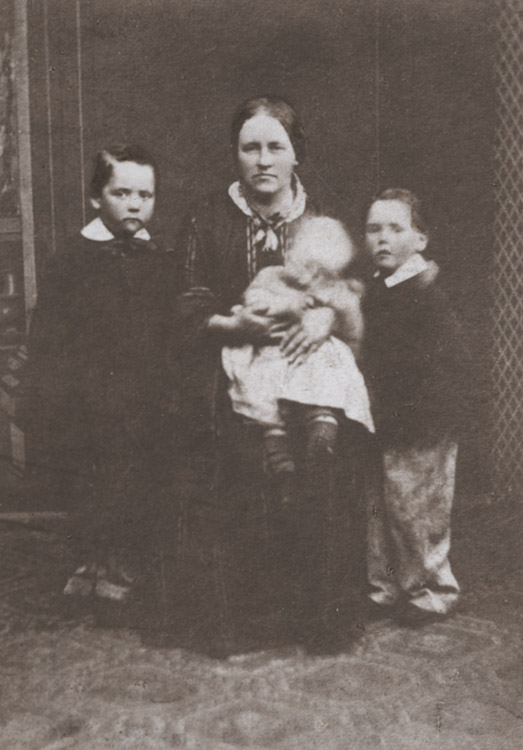
Catherine Davies and her children, who emigrated to Patagonia on Mimosa

Mimosa had already seen many years of service by the time it transported Welsh emigrants to Argentine Patagonia, South America. The ship was built in 1853 at Hall's shipyard in Aberdeen. Although the ship wasn't designed to carry passengers, it was converted for that purpose before the voyage. The cost of fitting, provisioning and chartering the ship was £2,500 and the passengers paid £12 per adult or £6 per child for the journey. Before the voyage, the emigrants assembled at various points, not always their places of origin, to prepare for the journey, including Aberdare, Birkenhead, and Mountain Ash.

Mimosa sailed from Liverpool, England on 28 May 1865 to Argentina, South America with a group of about 153 passengers with Captain George Pepperell and a crew of 18. The ship's surgeon for the voyage was Thomas Greene, an Irishman from Kildare. They landed on 28 July 1865 and named their landing site Porth Madryn. They were met by Edwyn Cynrig Roberts and Lewis Jones who had already arrived in Argentina in June 1865 to prepare for the arrival of the main body of settlers. Their aim was to establish a Welsh colony which would preserve the Welsh language and culture. The proposed site for the colony was in the Chubut River valley. On 15 September 1865 the first town in the Chubut colony was named Rawson after Guillermo Rawson (1821–1890), Argentine Minister of the Interior, who supported the Welsh settlement in Argentina, and the settlers went on to build the settlements at Gaiman and Trelew and several other.

== Welsh emigrants aboard Mimosa ==
The exact number of emigrants who sailed out to Patagonia on Mimosa remains uncertain. Although one of the original settlers, Richard Jones (Berwyn), maintained a register of births, marriages and deaths for many years, most of these original records were lost in the great flood in the Chubut Valley in 1899. In 1875, the Argentine government granted the Welsh settlers ownership of the land which encouraged hundreds of others from Wales to join the colony.

In the early 21st century, approximately 50,000 Argentines are of Welsh descent, of whom around 5,000 are Welsh speakers. The Welsh-Argentine colony, which became known as Y Wladfa, remains centered on Gaiman, Trelew and Trevelin.

== In popular culture ==
A Welsh-language musical Ymlaen Mimosa (Forward Mimosa) has been written by Machynlleth-based Rhydian Meilir, to be staged in his home village of Cemaes in tandem with the Maldwyn Meirionnydd National Eistedddfod in August 2027.

A concert featuring a selection of songs from the musical was staged at MOMA y Tabernacl, Machynlleth to mark the 160^{th} anniversary since the Mimosa ship landed in Puerto Madryn.

The music was composed by Rhydian Meilir, with author Pryderi Jones collaborating on the lyrics of some of the songs and writing the script for the show. Other Machynlleth artists featured included Aeron Pughe, Mike West and Liam Rickard. A CD and digital album of the songs was released a day after the concert on 25 January 2026.

== 1865 settlers ==
Name	Assembly point	Given age	Note
Austin, Thomas	Mountain Ash	17	
Austin, William	Mountain Ash	18	
Davies, Evan	Aberdare	25	
Davies, Ann	Aberdare	24	wife of Evan Davies
Davies, Margaret Ann	Aberdare	1	daughter of Evan & Ann Davies
Davies, James (Iago Dafydd)	Brynmawr	18	
Davies, John (Ioan Dafydd)	Mountain Ash	18	
	Llanrwst	11	
Davies, Rachel	Aberystwyth	28	wife of Lewis Davies
Davies, Thomas G.	Aberystwyth	3	son of Rachel and Lewis Davies
Davies, Robert	Llandrillo	40	
Davies, Catherine	Llandrillo	38	wife of Robert Davies
Davies, William	Llandrillo	8	son of Robert & Catherine Davies
Davies, Henry	Llandrillo	7	son of Robert & Catherine Davies
Davies, John	Llandrillo	1	son of Robert & Catherine Davies, died on board
Davies, John E.	Mountain Ash	30	
Davies, Selia	Mountain Ash	26	wife of John E. Davies
Davies, John	Mountain Ash	infant	son of John E. & Selia Davies
Davies, Thomas	Aberdare	40	
Davies, Eleanor	Aberdare	38	(second) wife of Thomas Davies
Davies, David	Aberdare	18	son of Thomas Davies (1st marriage)
Davies, Hannah	Aberdare	16	daughter of Thomas Davies (1st marriage)
Davies, Elizabeth	Aberdare	11	daughter of Thomas Davies (1st marriage)
Davies, Ann	Aberdare	7	daughter of Thomas Davies (1st marriage)
Davies, William	Liverpool, England	36	
Ellis, John	Liverpool, England	38	
Ellis, Thomas	Liverpool, England	36	
Ellis, Richard	Llanfechain, Llanfyllin	27	
Ellis, Frances	Llanfechain, Llanfyllin	27	
Evans, Daniel	Mountain Ash	27	
Evans, Mary	Mountain Ash	23	wife of Daniel Evans
Evans, Elizabeth	Mountain Ash	5	daughter of Daniel & Mary Evans
Evans, John Daniel	Mountain Ash	3	son of Daniel & Mary Evans
Evans, Thomas Pennant (Twmi Dimol)	Manchester, England	29	crew
Greene, Dr. Thomas William Nassau	Liverpool, England	21	crew (ships' doctor)
Harris, Thomas	Mountain Ash	31	
Harris, Sara	Mountain Ash	31	wife of Thomas Harris
Harris, William	Mountain Ash	11	son of Thomas & Sara Harris
Harris, John	Mountain Ash	6	son of Thomas & Sara Harris
Harris, Thomas	Mountain Ash	5	son of Thomas & Sara Harris
Harris, Daniel	Mountain Ash	infant	son of Thomas & Sara Harris
Hughes, Catherine	Birkenhead, England	24	
Hughes, Griffith	Rhosllannerchrugog	36	
Hughes, Mary	Rhosllannerchrugog	36	wife of Griffith Hughes
Hughes, Jane	Rhosllannerchrugog	11	daughter of Griffith & Mary Hughes
Hughes, Griffith	Rhosllannerchrugog	9	son of Griffith & Mary Hughes
Hughes, David	Rhosllannerchrugog	6	son of Griffith & Mary Hughes
Hughes, John	Rhosllannerchrugog	30	
Hughes, Elizabeth	Rhosllannerchrugog	39	wife of John Hughes
Hughes, William John	Rhosllannerchrugog	10	son of John & Elizabeth Hughes
Hughes, Myfanwy Mary	Rhosllannerchrugog	4	son of John & Elizabeth Hughes
Hughes, John Samuel	Rhosllannerchrugog	2	son of John & Elizabeth Hughes
Hughes, Henry	Rhosllannerchrugog	1	son of John & Elizabeth Hughes
Hughes (Cadfan), Hugh J.	Liverpool, England	41	
Hughes, Elizabeth	Liverpool, England	40	wife of Hugh Hughes
Hughes, Jane	Liverpool, England	20	daughter of Hugh & Elizabeth Hughes
Hughes, David	Liverpool, England	6	son of Hugh & Elizabeth Hughes
Hughes, Llewelyn	Liverpool, England	4	son of Hugh & Elizabeth Hughes
Hughes, Richard	Caernarfon	20	
Hughes, William	Anglesey	32	
Hughes, Jane	Anglesey	32	wife of William Hughes
Hughes, Jane	Anglesey	infant	daughter of William & Jane Hughes
Hughes, William	Abergynolwyn	33	widower, married Ann Lewis on board
Humphreys, Morris	Ganllwyd, Dolgellau	27	
Humphreys, Elizabeth Harriet	Ganllwyd, Dolgellau	21	wife of Maurice Humphreys
Humphreys, Lewis	Ganllwyd, Dolgellau	27	
Humphreys, John	Ganllwyd, Dolgellau	22	
Huws, Rhydderch	Manchester, England	33	
Huws, Sara	Manchester, England	37	wife of Rhydderch Huws
Huws, Meurig	Manchester, England	4	son of Rhydderch & Sara Huws
Jenkins, Aaron	Mountain Ash	35	
Jenkins, Rachel	Mountain Ash	32	née Evans
Jenkins, James	Mountain Ash	2	son of Aaron & Rachel Jenkins, died on board
Jenkins, Richard	Mountain Ash	1	son of Aaron & Rachel Jenkins
Jenkins, Rachel			daughter of Aaron & Rachel Jenkins, born on board
Jenkins, Thomas	Mountain Ash	23	
Jenkins, William	Mountain Ash	18	
John, David	Mountain Ash	31	
John, Mary Ann	Aberdare	24	
Jones, Evan	Aberdare	19	son of Eleanor Davies (1st marriage)
Jones, Thomas	Aberdare	15	son of Eleanor Davies (1st marriage)
Jones, David	Aberdare	13	son of Eleanor Davies (1st marriage)
Jones, Elizabeth	Aberdare	12	daughter of Eleanor Davies (1st marriage)
Jones, Elizabeth	Mountain Ash		
Jones, Anne	Bethesda	23	
Jones, George	Liverpool, England	16	
Jones, David	Liverpool, England	18	
Jones, James	Mountain Ash	27	
Jones, Sarah	Mountain Ash	24	wife of James Jones
Jones, Mary Anne	Mountain Ash	3	daughter of James & Sarah Jones
Jones, James	Mountain Ash	1	son of James & Sarah Jones
Jones, John	Mountain Ash	61	
Jones, Elizabeth	Mountain Ash	53	
Jones, Richard (Berwyn)	New York, United States	27	crew (purser)
Jones, Richard	Mountain Ash	21	son of John & Elizabeth Jones
Jones, Ann	Mountain Ash	18	daughter of John & Elizabeth Jones
Jones, Margaret	Mountain Ash	14	daughter of John & Elizabeth Jones
Jones, John (jnr)	Mountain Ash	28	
Jones, Mary	Mountain Ash	27	née Morgan, wife of John Jones (jnr)
Jones, Morgan			son of John & Mary Jones, born on board Mimosa
Jones, Thomas Harries	Mountain Ash	16	
Jones, Joseph Seth	Denbigh	20	
Jones, Joshua	Cwmaman, Aberdare	22	
Lewis Jones	Liverpool, England	28	advance party
Jones, Ellen	Liverpool, England	25	wife of Lewis Jones, advance party
Jones, Mary	Mountain Ash	22	
Jones, Stephen	Caernarfon	18	
Jones (Bedol), William R.	Bala	31	
Jones, Catherine	Bala	31	wife of William R. Jones
Jones, Mary Ann	Bala	4	daughter of William R. & Catherine Jones
Jones, Jane	Bala	1	daughter of William R. & Catherine Jones
Lewis, Anne	Abergynolwyn	35	née Pugh, widow, married William Hughes on board
Lewis, Mary	Mountain Ash		
Matthews, Abraham	Aberdare	32	
Matthews, Gwenllian	Aberdare	23	wife of Abraham Matthews
Matthews, Mary Annie	Aberdare	1	
Morgan, John	Pen-y-Garn, Aberystwyth	29	
Nagle, Robert	Birkenhead, England,	22	crew (passenger steward)
Owen, Ann	Liverpool, England		
Price, Edward	Liverpool, England	41	
Price, Martha	Liverpool, England	38	wife of Edward Price
Price, Edward	Liverpool, England	16	son of Edward & Martha Price
Price, Martha	Liverpool, England	2	daughter of Edward & Martha Price
Price, Griffith	Ffestiniog	27	
Pritchard, Elizabeth	Holyhead	20	
Rhys, James Berry	Ffestiniog	23	
Rhys, William Thomas	Trevethin	25	
Richards, William	Mountain Ash	19	
Roberts, Edwyn Cynrig	Nannerch & Wigan, England	27	advance party
Roberts, Elizabeth	Bangor, Wales	19	
Roberts, Grace	Bethesda	25	
Roberts, John Moelwyn	Ffestiniog	20	
Roberts, John,	Ffestiniog	27	
Roberts, Mary	Ffestiniog	27	wife of John Roberts
Roberts, Mary	Ffestiniog		daughter of John & Mary Roberts
Roberts, Thomas	Ffestiniog	2	son of John & Mary Roberts
Roberts, John	Ffestiniog	infant	son of John & Mary Roberts
Roberts, William	Seacombe, Liverpool, England	17	
Solomon, Griffith	Ffestiniog	23	
Solomon, Elizabeth	Ffestiniog	30	wife of Griffith Solomon
Solomon, Elizabeth	Ffestiniog	1	daughter of Griffith & Elizabeth Solomon, died on board
Thomas, John Murray	Bridgend, Wales	17	
Thomas, Robert	Bangor, Wales	29	
Thomas, Mary	Bangor, Wales	30	wife of Robert Thomas
Thomas, Mary	Bangor, Wales	5	daughter of Robert & Mary Thomas
Thomas, Catherine Jane	Bangor, Wales	2	daughter of Robert & Mary Thomas, died on board
Thomas, Thomas	Mountain Ash	26	
Williams, Amos	Bangor, Wales	25	crew (passenger cook)
Williams, Eleanor	Bangor, Wales	24	wife of Amos Williams
Williams, Elizabeth	Bangor, Wales		daughter of Amos & Eleanor Williams
Williams, Dafydd	Aberystwyth		
Williams, Jane	Liverpool, England	24	
Williams, John	Birkenhead, England	36	
Williams, Elizabeth	Birkenhead, England	31	wife of John Williams
Williams, John	Birkenhead, England	4	son of John & Elizabeth Williams
Williams, Elizabeth	Birkenhead, England	2	daughter of John & Elizabeth Williams
Williams, Watkin W. Pritchard	Birkenhead, England	33	
Williams, Elizabeth Louisa	Birkenhead, England	30	
Williams, Watkin Wesley	Birkenhead, England	27	
Williams, Catherine	Birkenhead, England		
Williams, Robert Meirion	Llanfairfechan	51	
Williams, Richard Howell	Llanfairfechan	18	son of Robert Meirion Williams
Williams, Thomas	Mountain Ash	60	
Williams, Mary,	Mountain Ash	55	
Williams, William	Liverpool, England	20	
Wood, Elizabeth	Liverpool, England	11	

== See also ==
- Welsh Tract
- Welsh colonization of the Americas

== Bibliography ==
- Susan Wilkinson - Mimosa: the life & times of the ship that sailed to Patagonia (Y Lolfa, 2007)
- Susan Wilkinson - Mimosa's Voyages: Official Logs, Crew List and Masters (Y Lolfa, 2007)
- Clare Dudman - A Place of Meadows and Tall Trees (Seren, 2010) - Novel based on the voyage and settlement.
