= Welsh settlement in the Americas =

Attempts by the Welsh to colonize the Americas

Welsh settlement in the Americas was the result of several individual initiatives to found distinctively Welsh settlements in the New World. It can be seen as part of the more general British colonization of the Americas.

== The Madoc legend ==
A story popularized in the 16th century claimed that the first European to see America was the Welsh prince Madoc in 1170. A son of Owain Gwynedd, prince of Gwynedd, he had supposedly fled his country during a succession crisis with a troop of colonists and sailed west. He eventually landed near the Mississippi River and founded a colony, which later mingled with the Native Americans. In the late 16th century the legend was used by writers such as John Dee to support English claims to North America. The legend was revived in the 18th century with tales of Welsh-speaking Native Americans, but most modern scholars consider it to have no basis in fact.

== North America ==
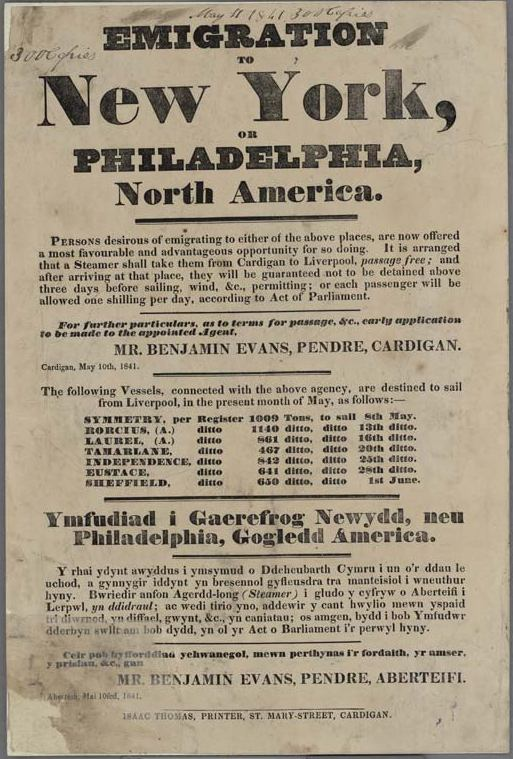
A bilingual poster advertising passage from Wales to New York or Philadelphia, 1841

There was extensive Welsh emigration to the United States and Canada, but only a few attempts to set up separate Welsh colonies. Sir William Vaughan sent Welsh colonists to Renews, Newfoundland in 1617 to establish a permanent colony, which eventually failed. Vaughan made further attempts to establish a colony at Trepassey which he called Cambriol and this eventually transformed into the Province of Avalon, under Lord Baltimore and dedicated "in imitation of Old Avalon in Somersetshire wherein Glassenbury stands, the first fruits of Christianity in Britain as the other was in that party of America."

=== Pennsylvania ===
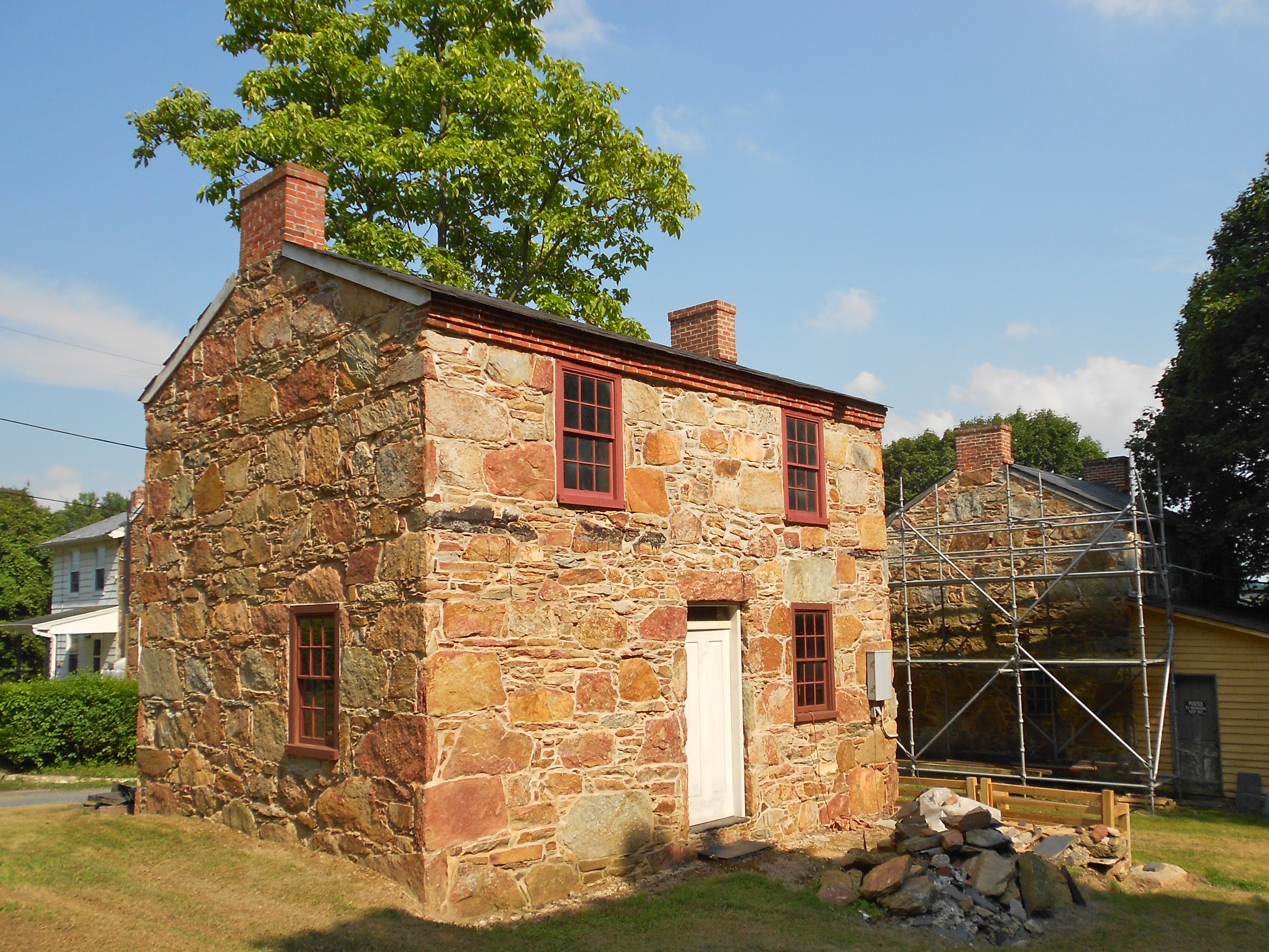
A stone cottage built in Coulsontown, Pennsylvania by quarrymen from Wales in the mid 19th century

Many Quakers from Wales emigrated to Pennsylvania in the 17th century with a promise from William Penn that they would be allowed to set up a Welsh colony there. The Welsh Tract was to have been a separate county whose local government would use the Welsh language, since many of the settlers spoke no English. The promise however was not kept and by the 1690s the land had already been partitioned into different counties, and the Tract never gained self-government.

In the late 18th century, a Welsh colony named Cambria was established by Morgan John Rhys in what is now Cambria County, Pennsylvania. Later, between 1856 and 1867, there was an attempt by Samuel Roberts to establish a Welsh colony at Brynffynnon, Tennessee. Meanwhile, Michael D. Jones developed plans to establish colonies in Wisconsin, Oregon, and in British Columbia, but these were not realized.

=== Idaho ===
Malad Valley was settled in the 1860s by Welsh pioneers who brought their Welsh traditions with them. One important tradition was an annual eisteddfod, patterned after the music and poetry contests held in Wales for over 900 years.

Malad Valley's eisteddfod was an annual cultural arts event held in Malad and Samaria on alternating years. Judges came from Salt Lake City to choose the best vocal and instrumental numbers and recitations. The eisteddfod was an all-day event with people coming from all over Oneida County. The custom continued until 1916 and World War I.

=== Tennessee ===
Following the American Civil War, 104 Welsh immigrant families moved from Pennsylvania to East Tennessee. These Welsh families settled in an area now known as Mechanicsville, and part of the city of Knoxville. These families were recruited by the brothers Joseph and David Richards to work in a rolling mill then co-owned by John H. Jones.

The Richards brothers co-founded the Knoxville Iron Works beside the L&N Railroad, later to be used as the site for the World's Fair 1982. Of the original buildings of the Iron Works where Welsh immigrants worked, only the structure housing the restaurant 'The Foundry' remains. In 1982 World's Fair the building was known as the Strohause.

Having first met at donated space at the Second Presbyterian Church, the immigrant Welsh built their own Congregational Church with the Reverend Thomas Thomas serving as the first pastor in 1870. However, by 1899 the church property was sold.

The Welsh immigrant families became successful and established other businesses in Knoxville, which included a company that built coal cars, several slate roofing companies, a marble company, and several furniture companies. By 1930 many Welsh dispersed into other sections of the city and neighboring counties such as Sevier County. Today, more than 250 families in greater Knoxville can trace their ancestry directly to these original immigrants. The Welsh tradition in Knoxville is remembered with Welsh descendants celebrating St. David's Day.

=== Ohio ===
Jackson and Gallia counties in Ohio were settled by Welsh immigrants in the 19th century, many from the Ceredigion area of West Wales.

=== New York ===
In 1795 Welsh immigrants settled in the village of Remsen, New York where their families flourished as dairy farmers. Numerous stone houses and barns in the region attest to the Welsh heritage. Oneida County and Utica, New York became the cultural center of the Welsh-American community in the 19th century. Suffering from poor harvests in 1789 and 1802 and dreaming of land ownership, the initial settlement of five Welsh families soon attracted other agricultural migrants, settling Steuben, Utica and Remsen townships. The first Welsh settlers arrived in the 1790s. Numerous Welsh immigrants settled in the town of Freedom and surrounding townships in Cattaraugus County in southwestern New York during the 19th century.

In 1848, the lexicographer John Russell Bartlett noted that Oneida County had a number of Welsh language newspapers and magazines, as well as Welsh churches. Indeed Bartlett noted in his Dictionary of Americanisms that "one may travel for miles (across Oneida County) and hear nothing but the Welsh language". By 1855, there were four thousand Welshmen in Oneida.

With the Civil War, many of the New York Welshmen began moving west, especially to Michigan and Wisconsin. They operated small farms and clung to their historic traditions. The church was the centre of Welsh community life, and a vigorous Welsh-speaking press kept ethnic consciousness strong. Strongly Republican, the Welsh gradually assimilated into the larger society without totally abandoning their own ethnic cultural patterns. The Welsh language still being spoken in the area well into the 1970s.

== South America ==
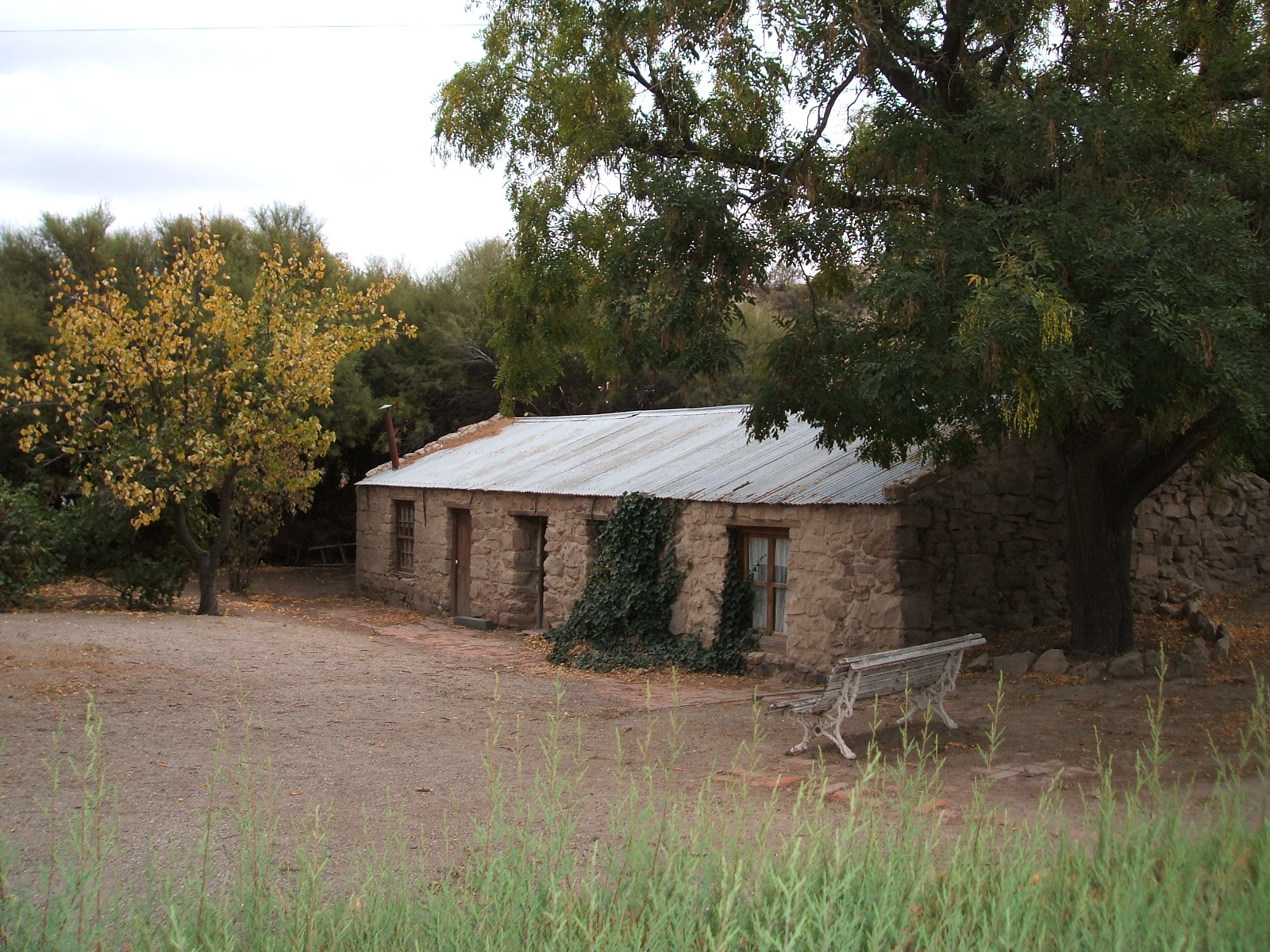
Old stone house from early Welsh settlement in Gaiman, Chubut, Argentina

In 1852 Thomas Benbow Phillips of Tregaron established a settlement of about 100 Welsh people in the state of Rio Grande do Sul in Brazil. Many of these colonists later moved to the more successful colony in Argentina as part of Y Wladfa ("The Colony").

The best known of the Welsh colonies, the colony in the Chubut Valley of Patagonia known as Y Wladfa Gymreig ("The Welsh Colony"), was established in 1865 when 153 settlers landed at what is now Puerto Madryn. Shortly before this, the colonists had reached an agreement with Argentina's minister of the interior, Guillermo Rawson, that the colony would be recognized as one of the states of Argentina when its population reached 20,000. However this pledge was not ratified by the Argentine Congress, out of fear that the British government would use the presence of the settlers as an excuse to seize Patagonia.

== See also ==
- Welsh Americans
