= Dr Williams' School =

School in Dolgellau, Wales

Coordinates: 52.7447°N 3.8969°W

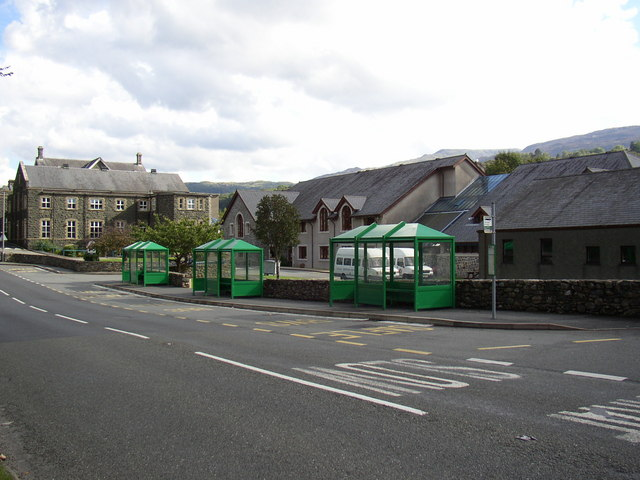
Buildings which housed Dr Williams School, Dolgellau

Dr Williams' School was a school founded in Dolgellau in 1875. It opened its doors in 1878 and continued until it was closed in 1975.

Samuel Holland was actively involved in setting the school up and became its first Chairman of the Board of Governors.

The site of the school is now occupied by Coleg Meirion-Dwyfor.

== Notable people associated with Dr Williams School ==
- Bessie Craigmyle was a teacher here in the 1880s.
- Margaret Lloyd George was educated here.
- Bahiyyih Nakhjavani was also educated here.
- Dilys Elwyn-Edwards was born in Dolgellau and attended DWS in the 1930s. In an interview with her recorded in 1984 she talked about the school's influence on her musical career.
- Marion Eames was a pupil at DWS from 1932 to 1937. She is considered to be one of the foremost Welsh historical novelists. Her first novels, Y Stafell Ddirgel (1969) and Y Rhandir Mwyn (1972), are historical novels based on the Quakers of Dolgellau and their emigration to Pennsylvania.
- Bronwen Astor, Viscountess Astor (Died 28 December 2017) attended Dr Williams' School during World War II and wrote a graphic account of her experiences at that time.
- Eluned Morgan was born in 1870 on board the Myfanwy en route to the Welsh settlement in Patagonia. She is regarded as one of Patagonia's leading Welsh-language writers. She was the daughter of Lewis Jones, one of the founders of the Welsh Settlement.

== Arms ==
Coat of arms of Dr Williams' School
Notes Granted 27 October 1932 Escutcheon Or a pile reversed Sable ensigned on the top with a fire-beacon Proper on a chief of the second three mullets of six points of the first. Motto Ardua Semper (Always to strive)
