= Bessie Craigmyle =

Scottish poet

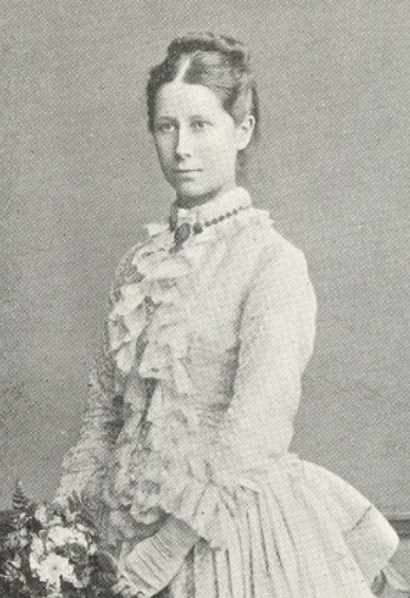
- Bessie Craigmyle, from a portrait made about 1886
- Born: Elizabeth Craigmyle; 4 September 1863; Aberdeen, U.K.
- Died: 28 February 1933 (age 69)
- Other names: Elizabeth Craigmile
- Occupations: Poet, schoolteacher

Elizabeth "Bessie" Craigmyle (4 September 1863 – 28 February 1933) was a Scottish poet, translator, and schoolteacher, who lived in Aberdeen and taught in Wales. Her poems continue to receive scholarly attention, in part for their themes of women's intimacy in nineteenth-century Scotland.

== Early life and education ==
Craigmyle was born in Aberdeen, one of the five daughters of Francis Craigmyle and Emma Bearham Craigmyle. Her father was a schoolmaster, who retired when she was still a child. He was able to devote his energies to his daughters' education, providing an extensive library and a number of greenhouses in the family home for their use. Her father died in 1883, and her mother died in 1913. Craigmyle attended West End Academy and Girls' High School in Aberdeen. She was brought up in the Presbyterian faith.

== Career ==
After qualifying as school teacher, Craigmyle taught in the Dr Williams School, Dolgellau, which was a pioneering secondary school for girls. She was a lecturer at Bishop Otter's College in Chichester. After 1886 she lived in Aberdeen, where she taught at St Mary's School; her students were the children of British parents working in India. She was pro-suffrage and a member of the Women’s Liberal Association.

== Works ==
- Poems and Translations (1886, dedicated to Margaret Dale)
- A Handful of Pansies (1888, dedicated to Margaret Dale)
- Goethe's Faust, with some of the minor poems (1889, editor)
- German Ballads (1892, editor and translator)

Craigmyle's poem "Cleopatra" was included in Sonnets of this Century (1887), edited by William Sharp. and "Under Deep Apple Boughs" and "A Wasted Day" appeared in Elizabeth Amelia Sharp's Women's Voices (1887). "My Bookcase" was chosen for Book-song, An Anthology of Poems for Books and Bookmen by Modern Authors (1893), edited by Joseph Gleeson White.

== Personal life and legacy ==
In her teens, Craigmyle met and fell in love with Margaret (Maggie) Dale, another daughter of a schoolmaster. Craigmyle wrote love poems addressed to Dale, and dedicated both of her books of poetry to Dale. They shared an ambition to become doctors, and Dale accepted a position at St. Andrew's Scots School in Buenos Aires. While in Argentina she was engaged to be married, but then died. When news of this reached Craigmyle, she suffered from a breakdown. She traveled to Florence with another woman, to convalesce. Craigmyle died at the age of 69, from burns sustained in an accident on the 46th anniversary of Margaret Dale's death in 1933.

Craigmyle's poems have continued to be included in anthologies over the years, including Decadent Verse: An Anthology of Late-Victorian Poetry, 1872-1900 (2011), edited by Caroline Blyth. "The First Kiss", her translation from Heine, was set to music in 1939 by Katherine Bothwell Thomson.
