= Maria Sonia Cristoff =

Argentine writer (born 1965)

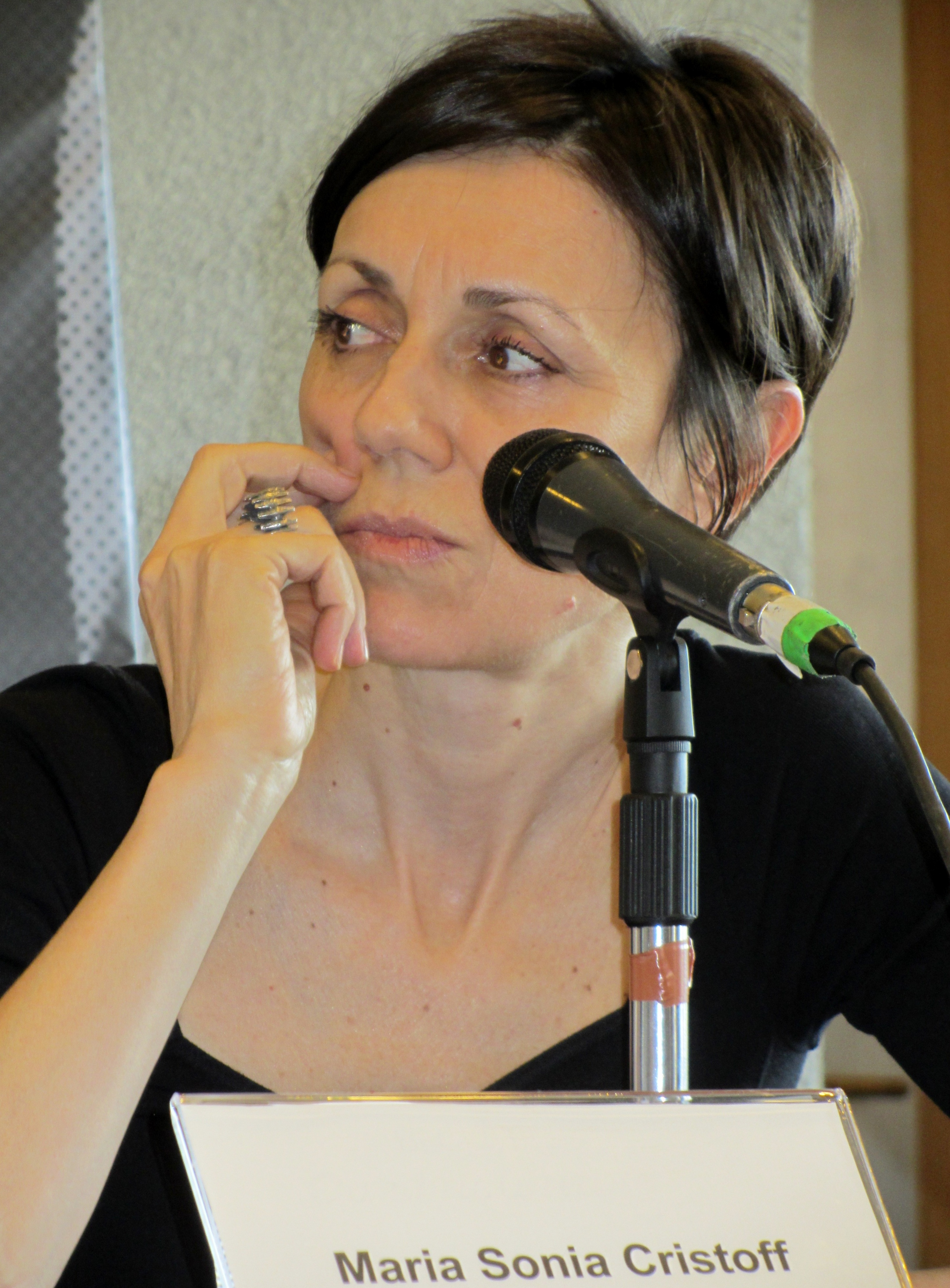
Cristoff at the Santiago International Book Fair 2015

María Sonia Cristoff (born 1965) is an Argentine writer. She was born in Trelew but since the early 1980s has been based in Buenos Aires. Falsa Calma was translated into English by Katherine Silver in 2018.

== Career ==
She writes both fiction and non fiction. Some of her usual topics are cultural practices such as walking and travelling, the relationship between humans and animals, isolation, and life in contemporary metropolis. She wrote Falsa calma [A False Calm, 2005], a journey through ghost towns in Patagonia; Desubicados [Misfits, 2006], a novella taking place in a single day at the Buenos Aires zoo; and the novel Bajo influencia [Under the Influence, 2010]. The line between the fictional and the documentary is somehow blurred in her writing. Her books as an editor (Patagonia, Idea crónica and Pasaje a Oriente) are related to the same subjects as her narrative. She teaches creative writing at Centro Cultural Ricardo Rojas (Universidad de Buenos Aires) and has participated as a writer in residency in Leipzig, Germany, and at the International Writing Program at the University of Iowa. Her literary pieces and criticism have been published in different newspapers and magazines from her country and abroad, and her narrative and essays have been included in different collective volumes.

All of her works have been translated into German and published by Berenberg Verlag.

== Publications ==
- Acento extranjero [Foreign Accent], Buenos Aires, Editorial Sudamericana, 2000
- Patagonia, Buenos Aires, Cántaro editores, 2005
- Falsa calma [A False Calm], Buenos Aires, Editorial Seix Barral, 2005. Published in Germany by Berenberg Verlag, 2010
- Idea crónica [Chronical Idea], Rosario, Beatriz Viterbo Editora, 2006
- Desubicados [Misfits], Buenos Aires, Editorial Sudamericana, 2006. Published in Germany by Berenberg Verlag, 2012
- Pasaje a Oriente [Passage to the Orient], Buenos Aires, Fondo de Cultura Económica, 2009
- Bajo influencia [Under the Influence], Buenos Aires, Editorial Edhasa, 2010
- Inclúyanme afuera [Include me out], Buenos Aires, Editorial Mardulce, 2014. Published in Germany by Berenberg Verlag. 2015
- Mal de época. Mardulce Editora, 211 pp., 2017

== See also ==
- Lists of writers
