= Dilys Elwyn-Edwards =

Welsh composer

Dilys Elwyn Edwards
- Born: Dilys Roberts; 19 August 1918; Dolgellau, Gwynedd, Wales, UK
- Died: 13 January 2012 (aged 93); Llanberis, Gwynedd, Wales, UK
- Occupation: Composer
- Known for: Mae Hiraeth yn y Môr

Dilys Elwyn-Edwards (née Roberts; 19 August 1918 – 13 January 2012) was a Welsh-language composer, lecturer and accompanist.

== Biography ==
Dilys Roberts was born on 19 August 1918 in Dolgellau, Wales. She attended Dr Williams' School for Girls, a grammar school which educated girls ages 7–18 from 1878 to 1975. She was offered the Turle Music Scholarship at Girton College, Cambridge and the Dr. Joseph Parry Scholarship, from Cardiff University. She elected to study at Cardiff and received her BMus degree. She taught music at her old school, Dr Williams', Dolgellau, for the next three years. She then received the Open Scholarship in Composition from the Royal College of Music in London and studied composition with Herbert Howells and piano with Kathleen McQuitty there.

She married David Elwyn Edwards, a Methodist minister and theological scholar, in 1947. She moved to Oxford while her husband attended Mansfield College. She taught music from 1946 to 1972.

In the 1960s they moved back to Wales, where Elwyn became minister for the Calvinist Methodist chapel in Castle Square, Caernarfon. In 1973 she became a piano tutor at Bangor Normal College and Bangor University in North Wales, where she proved to be a popular, effective and much-respected teacher of the instrument. She was also an Eisteddfod adjudicator, and appeared and performed on radio and television. The BBC commissioned a number of works from her. She died on 13 January 2012, in a nursing home at Llanberis, Gwynedd, aged 93.

== Music ==
She was known for her soft, melodic art songs (Lied) for voice in both Welsh and English. Charlotte Church and Aled Jones have recorded Caneuon y Tri Aderyn (Three Welsh Bird Songs; 1962): Y Gylfinir (The Curlew), Tylluanod (Owls), and her most famous song, Mae Hiraeth yn y Môr (There is longing in the sea, R. Williams Parry's sonnet set to music). This work was commissioned by the BBC in 1961 for the Welsh tenor Kenneth Bowen. Bryn Terfel recorded in 2004 on his DG CD "Silent Noon" The Cloths of Heaven/ Gwisg Nefoedd by Elwyn-Edwards (with text by W.B. Yeats).

== Works ==
- Aderyn Crist (The Bird of Christ), 1948
- Memory Come Hither (text by William Blake), 1954
- Gwlad Hud (Countryside Magic), 1955
  - Gwraig Lleu (The Wife of Llew)
  - Y Darganfyddiad (The Find)
  - Yr Hela Hud (A Fairy Hunt)
- Dylluan Deg (Sweet Suffolk Owl), 1957
- In Faerie, 1959
- Mari Lawen (Merry Margaret), 1959
- Chwe Chân i Blant (Six Songs for Children), 1959
  - Y Ddwy Wydd Dew (The Two Fat Geese)
  - Pen Felyn (Golden Hair)
  - Hwyaden (The Duckling)
  - Morys y Gwynt (Morris the Wind)
  - Cwningod (Rabbits)
  - Guto Benfelyn (Goldheaded Gitto)
- Caneuon y Tri Aderyn (Songs of the Three Birds), 1962, Solo-S/T
  - Y Gylfinir (The Curlew)
  - Tylluanod (The Owls)
  - Mae Hiraeth yn y Môr (There's Longing in the Sea)
- Caneuon Gwynedd (Songs for Gwynedd)
  - Rhos y Pererinion (The Pilgrims' Isle)
  - Rhodio’r Fenai (Beside the Wide Menai)
  - Ynys Afallon (The Isle of Avalon)
- The Shepherd (text by William Blake), 1968
- Tre-saith. Geiriau gan Cynan (What do you see in Tre-saith?), 1970, SATB
- Enter these enchanted woods (text by George Meredith), 1972
- Caneuon Natur (Nature Songs), 1977
  - Y Mynydd (The Mountain)
  - Deilen (Leaves)
  - Noson o Haf (Night of Summer)
- Eirlysiau (Snowdrops), 1979
- Y Llong (A Ship on the Blue Sea), 1979
- Salm 23 (Psalm 23)
- Salm 121 : Codi fly llygaid wnaf i'r bryniau draw (Psalm 121: I will lift up mine eyes unto the hills) (1985)
- Salm 100 (Psalm 100)
- Hwiangerddi (Lullabies), 1986, Solo
  - Boneddwr mawr o'r Bala (The gentleman from Bala)
  - Cysga di (Go to sleep)
  - Y gwcw (The cuckoo)
  - Hwyaid (Ducks)
  - Mae gen i ddafad gorniog (I have a horned sheep)
  - Mae gen i ebol melyn (I have a yellow colt)
  - Pedoli (The horseshoe)
  - Pwsi meri mew (The Kitty Cat)
- Caneuon y tymhorau (Songs of the Seasons), 1991–1993
  - Gaeaf (Winter)
  - Y Gwanwyn (Spring)
  - Yr Haf (Summer)
  - Hydref (Autumn)
- Bro a mynydd: dwy gan i fariton a phiano (Two songs for baritone and piano), 1993, B
- Mi Welais Dair o Longau (I Saw Three Ships), 1993, Solo
- Dwy Gân i Fair (Two Songs for Mary), 1997
  - Dywed, Fair (Tell us, Mary)
  - Noël (Noël)
- Yr Eos (The Nightingale), 1997
- Cân a Dwy Garol, 1998
  - Llygad y Dydd yn Ebrill (A Daisy in April)
  - Ave Maris Stella (Hail, Star of the Sea)
  - Stille Nacht (Silent Night)
- Y Griafolen (The Rowan-Tree), 2001, Solo-S/T
- Dwy gerdd gan Walter de la Mare (Two poems by Walter de la Mare), 2002, Solo-S/T
  - Cerddoriaeth (Music)
  - Beddargraff (An Epitaph)
- Ar gyfer heddiw'r bore (For this morning), SATB
- Can y tri llanc (Song of 3 youths), SATB
- Clychau'r Gôg (Bluebells)
- Ffliwt a phib (Sound the Flute)
- Hynod Hen (All that's past) (text by Walter de la Mare)
- Offeren Fer (Missa Brevis, Short mass), SATB
- In Excelsis Gloria
- Jubilate Deo
- Molwch yr Arglwydd (Laudate Dominum, Praise the Lord)
- Kyrie
- Pum can fyfyriol (Five Reflective Songs) (These appear in other song cycles)
  - Dywed, Fair (Tell us, Mary)
  - Noël (Noël)
  - Rhos y Pererinion (The Pilgrims' Isle):
- Rhodio'r Fenai (Beside the Wide Menai)
  - Ynys Afallon (The Isle of Avalon)
- Roedd yn y wlad honno (It was in that country), SATB
- The cloths of heaven (text by William Butler Yeats)
