= Thomas Benbow Phillips =

Pioneer of Welsh settlements in Brazil and Argentina

Thomas Benbow Phillips (14 February 1828 - 30 January 1915) was a pioneer of the Welsh settlements in Brazil and, more successfully, Patagonia during the 19th century.

Phillips was baptised 12 Sept 1830 at St. Saviour's church, Southwark, Surrey, the son of Thomas Phillips, a labourer, and Susan his wife, but is said to have been born in either Manchester or Tregaron, where he grew up. Living in Manchester in 1848, he came into contact with cotton traders, who were eager to establish a colony in Brazil to grow cotton for their mills in Lancashire. Phillips travelled to Rio Grande do Sul, Brazil to begin making arrangements, and by the end of May 1851 had been joined by six groups of Welsh immigrants. However, the settlement failed, apparently because most of the immigrants had backgrounds in the mining industry and found work in the Brazilian coal mines more profitable than growing cotton.

Phillips married a Brazilian woman, María Januaria Buena Florinal, but after her death in 1872 moved to the larger Welsh colony of Y Wladfa, in Patagonia. There, he became one of the most prominent members of the settlement at Chubut, and in 1898, with Llwyd ap Iwan, travelled to London to present the British government with a list of the community's grievances against the government of Argentina. However, the government in London refused to entertain demands that it should assert sovereignty over the settlement.

Phillips returned to Patagonia, where he continued to live until his death in 1915.
