= Lewis Jones (Patagonia) =

One of the founders of the Welsh settlement in Patagonia

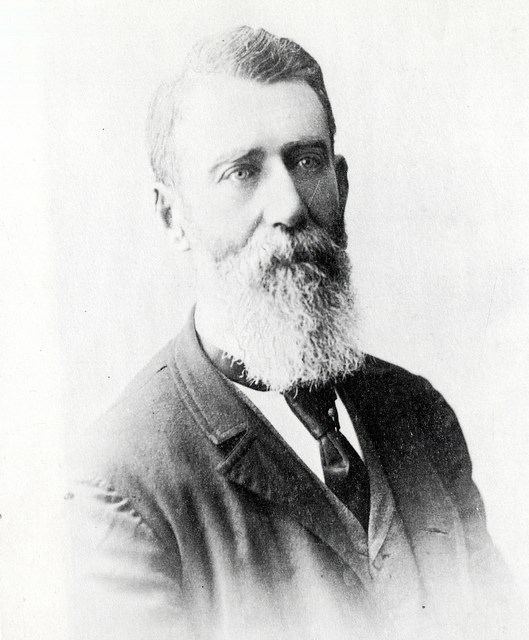
Lewis Jones, c. 1880

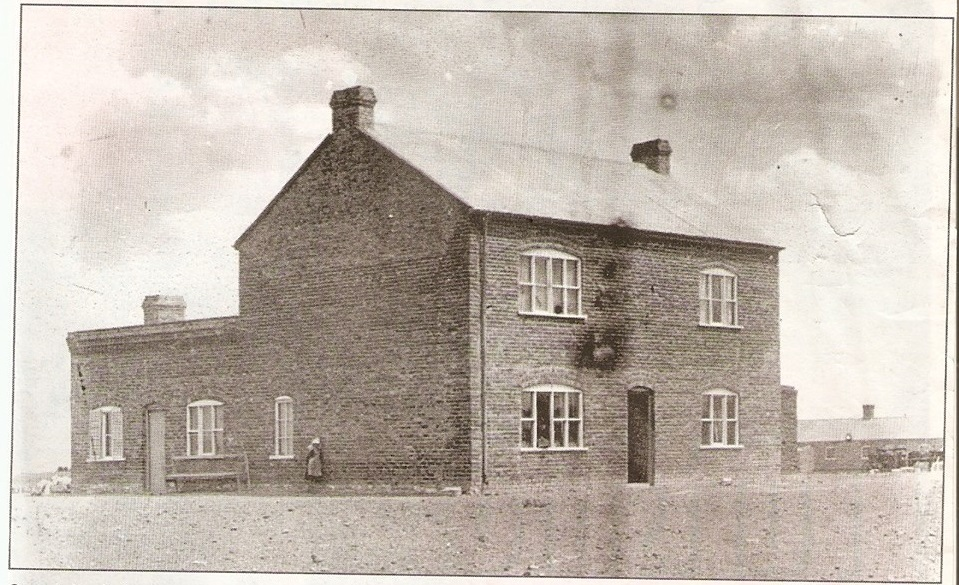
House of Lewis Jones in Trelew.

Lewis Jones (30 January 1837 – 24 November 1904) was one of the founders of the Welsh settlement in Patagonia. The city of Trelew was named after him.

== Early life ==
Jones was born in Caernarfon and worked as a printer in Holyhead, where he was co-editor of the Welsh periodical Y Punch Cymraeg. Later he moved to Liverpool and married Ellen Griffith in 1859.

== Career ==
While in Liverpool, he became one of the main leaders of the movement which was set up to establish a Welsh settlement in a suitable location, where Welsh emigrants could stay together and preserve their language and way of life. In 1862 Lewis Jones accompanied Captain Love Jones-Parry to Patagonia to investigate whether it was a suitable area for the project. They first visited Buenos Aires where they held discussions with the minister Guillermo Rawson then having come to an agreement headed south. They reached Patagonia in a small ship named the Candelaria, and were driven by a storm into a bay which they named "Porth Madryn" after Jones-Parry's estate in Wales. The town which grew near the spot where they landed is now named Puerto Madryn. They returned to Wales with a favourable report, which was further embellished by Lewis Jones in a series of speeches.

Lewis Jones and Edwyn Cynrig Roberts went to Patagonia ahead of the main party to prepare the ground, and were there to welcome the settlers when the Mimosa landed. However a quarrel broke out when some of the settlers complained that the land was by no means as suitable for settlement as Lewis Jones had claimed. Jones moved to Buenos Aires to work as a printer for a period, but when he heard in 1867 that some of the settlers were planning to leave Patagonia he returned to persuade them to stay. He set up a printing press and published two Welsh newspapers, Ein Breiniad and Y Drafod. The Argentine government appointed him governor for a period, but he was also imprisoned for supporting the rights of the Welsh settlers against the government. In the 1870s he made a number of trips to explore the area beyond the Chubut valley.

Lewis Jones was the driving force behind the construction of a railway running up the Chubut valley from Puerto Madryn. In 1884 the Argentine Congress authorised the construction of the Central Chubut Railway by Lewis Jones y Cia. Raising funds locally to set up a company to build the railway proved difficult, so Lewis Jones went to the United Kingdom with his daughter Eluned to try to raise the money there. Initially he had little success, but on a train journey from London to Bangor the fact that he and Eluned were chatting in Spanish aroused the curiosity of a fellow passenger, Asahel P. Bell, an engineer. It was Bell who assisted them to set up the company in Liverpool. Work on the railway began in 1886, helped by the arrival of another 465 Welsh settlers on the steamer Vesta. The town which grew at the railhead was named Trelew in honour of Lewis Jones ("Tre" is the Welsh for "town"). The town grew rapidly and in 1888 became the headquarters of the "Compañía Mercantil del Chubut" (Chubut Trading Company).

== Death ==
Lewis Jones died in 1904, the year in which Trelew elected its first municipal authority, and was buried in the Moriah cemetery by the River Chubut, facing Trelew. His daughter, Eluned Morgan, became a prominent figure in the life of the Welsh settlement, and is generally regarded as the finest Welsh language writer produced by Patagonia.
