= Y Wladfa =

Former Welsh settlement in Argentina

Welsh Argentines
Ariannin Cymreig (Welsh) Galenses (Spanish)
- Flag of Y Wladfa colony

Total population
- 80,000

Regions with significant populations
- Chubut Province

Languages
- Spanish, Patagonian Welsh, English

Religion
- Protestantism (mostly Methodism and Presbyterianism) and Roman Catholicism

Related ethnic groups
- Welsh, Argentines, English Argentines, Irish Argentines, Scottish Argentines, Welsh Americans, Welsh Canadians, Welsh Australians, Afro Argentine

Welsh speaking settlements in Argentina

Y Wladfa (Welsh pronunciation: [ə ˈwladva], 'The Settlement'), also occasionally Y Wladychfa Gymreig (Welsh pronunciation: [ə wlaˈdəχva ɡəmˈreiɡ], 'The Welsh Settlement'), refers to the establishment of settlements by Welsh colonists and immigrants in the Argentine Patagonia, beginning in 1865, mainly along the coast of the lower Chubut Valley. In 1881, the area became part of the Chubut National Territory of Argentina which, in 1955, became Chubut Province.

In the 19th and early 20th centuries, the Argentine government encouraged immigration from Europe to populate Argentina and south Patagonia particularly, which until the Conquest of the Desert had sparsely rural and coastal settlements. Between 1856 and 1875, 34 settlements of immigrants of various nationalities were established in Santa Fe and Entre Ríos. In addition to the main colony in Chubut, a smaller colony was set up in Santa Fe by 44 Welsh people who left Chubut, and another group settled at Coronel Suárez in southern Buenos Aires Province.

The Welsh-Argentine community is centred on Gaiman, Dolavon, Trelew, and Trevelin. There are 80,000 Welsh-Patagonians. However, Chubut estimates the number of Patagonian Welsh speakers to be about 1,500, while other estimates put the number at 5,000.

== History ==
=== First settlers 1865 ===
Percentage of people registered as British in the 1914 Argentine census. Within this group are Welsh, English, Irish and Scottish.

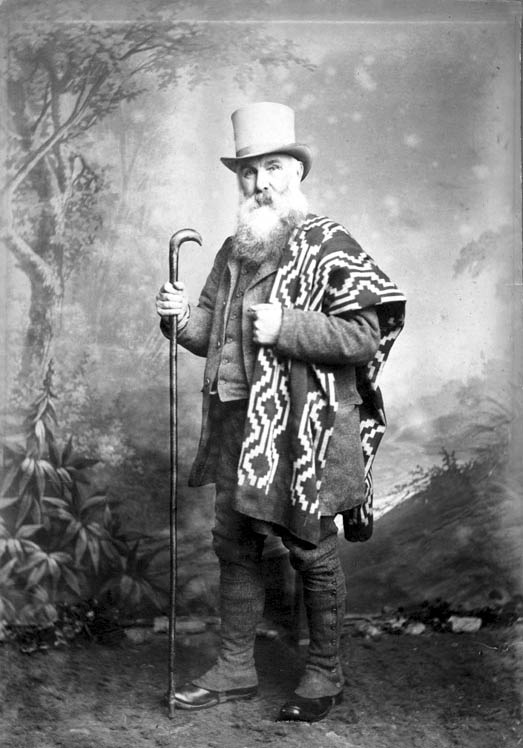
The Rev. Michael D. Jones (1822–1898)

Reconstruction of the flag used in the 19th century, at least in 1865. Has gained popularity in recent years.

The idea of a Welsh colony in Patagonia was put forward by Michael D. Jones, a Welsh nationalist nonconformist preacher based in Bala, Gwynedd, who had called for a new "little Wales beyond Wales". He spent some years in the United States, where he observed that Welsh immigrants assimilated very quickly compared with other peoples and often lost much of their Welsh identity. Thus, the original proposal was to establish a new Wales overseas where Welsh settlers and their culture would be generally free from foreign domination. He proposed setting up a Welsh-speaking colony away from the influence of the English language. He recruited settlers and provided financing; Australia, New Zealand and even Palestine were considered, but Patagonia was chosen for its isolation and the Argentines' offer of 100 square miles (260 km^{2}) of land along the Chubut River in exchange for settling the still-unconquered land of Patagonia for Argentina. Jones had no doubt of his right to take possession there, writing "other lands are available and they are in complete possession of savage people, such as Patagonia, and it is undoubtedly possible to make a colony in a land like this...".

Patagonia, including the Chubut Valley, was claimed by Buenos Aires but it had little control over the area (which was also claimed by Chile). Jones had been corresponding with the Argentine government about settling an area known as Bahía Blanca where Welsh immigrants could preserve their language and culture. The Argentine government granted the request as it put them in control of a large tract of land. A Welsh immigration committee met in Liverpool and published a handbook, Llawlyfr y Wladfa, to publicize the scheme to form a Welsh colony in Patagonia which was distributed throughout Wales.

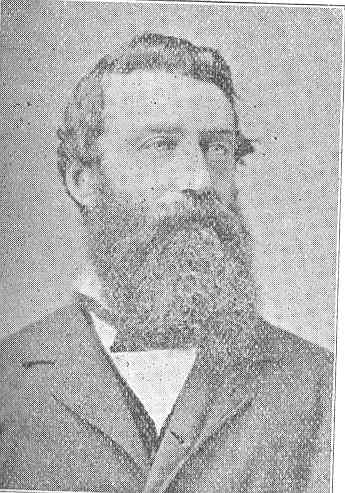
Lewis Jones

Towards the end of 1862, Captain Love Jones-Parry and Lewis Jones (after whom Trelew was named) left for Patagonia to decide whether it was a suitable area for Welsh emigrants. They first visited Buenos Aires where they held discussions with the Interior Minister Guillermo Rawson then, having come to an agreement, headed south. They reached Patagonia in a small ship named the Candelaria, and were driven by a storm into a bay which they named Porth Madryn, after Jones-Parry's estate in Wales. The town that grew near the spot where they landed is now named Puerto Madryn. On their return to Wales they declared the area to be very suitable for colonization.

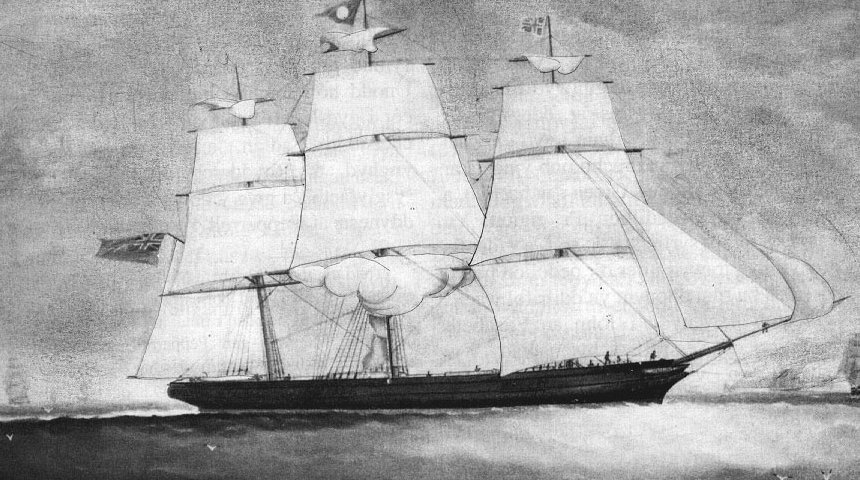
The Mimosa.

On 28 July 1865, 153 Welsh settlers arrived aboard the clipper ship Mimosa. The Mimosa settlers, including tailors, cobblers, carpenters, brickmakers, and miners, comprised 56 married adults, 33 single or widowed men, 12 single women (usually sisters or servants of married immigrants), and 52 children; the majority (92) were from the South Wales Coalfield and English urban centres. There were few farmers. This was rather unfortunate, particularly when they discovered that the attractions of the area had been oversold and they had landed in an arid semi-desert with little food; they had been told that the area was like lowland Wales. At the coast there was little drinking water, and the group embarked on a walk across the parched plain with a single wheelbarrow to carry their belongings. Some died and a baby, Mary Humphries, was born on the march. John Williams was the only colonist with any form of rudimentary medical skill. So disheartened were some settlers, they requested that the British Government settle them on the Falkland Islands. However, this request was ignored.

While visiting Puerto Madryn, during the mid-1970s, Bruce Chatwin wrote, "A hundred and fifty-three Welsh colonists landed here off the brig Mimosa in 1865. They were poor people in search of a New Wales, refugees from cramped coal-mining valleys, from a failed independence movement, and from Parliament's ban on Welsh in schools. Their leaders had combed the earth for a stretch of open country uncontaminated by Englishmen. They chose Patagonia for its absolute remoteness and foul climate; they did not want to get rich. The Argentine Government gave them land along the Chubut River (Welsh: Afon Camwy). From Madryn it was a stretch of forty miles over the thorn desert. And when they did reach the valley, they had the impression that God, not the Government, had given them the land."

Once they reached the valley of the Chubut River, their first settlement was a small fortress on the site which later became the town of Rawson, now the capital of Chubut Province. This was referred to as Yr Hen Amddiffynfa ('The Old Fortress'). The first houses, constructed from earth, were washed away by a flash flood in 1865, and new houses of superior quality were built to replace them. The floods also washed away crops of potatoes and maize. The rainfall in the area was much less than the colonists had been led to expect, leading to crop failures.

=== Consolidation 1866–1888 ===
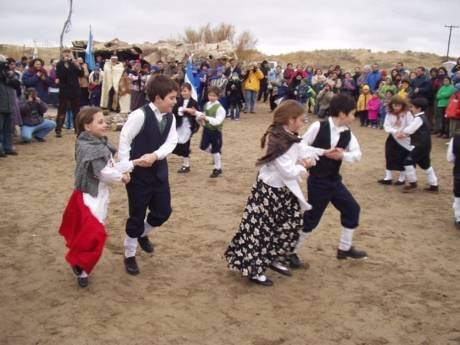
Welsh traditions in Rawson

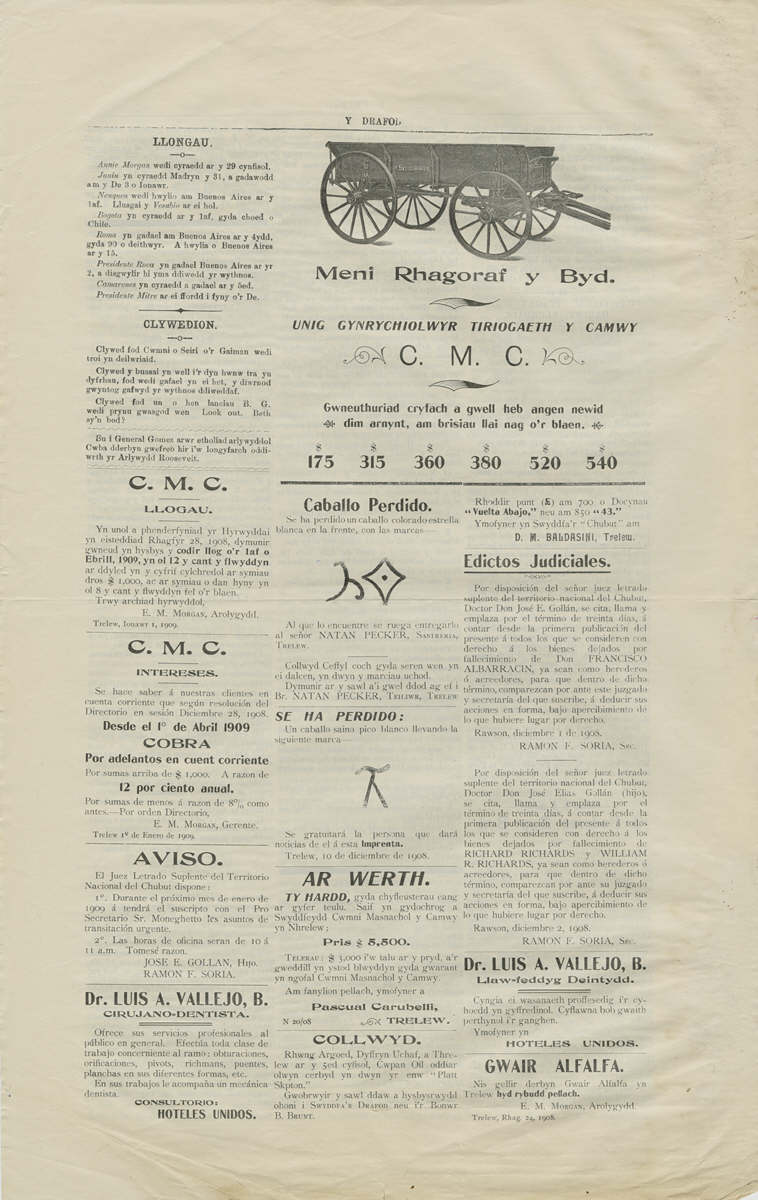
Y Drafod

The settlers first made contact with the local Tehuelche people almost a year after their arrival. After some difficult early years of suspicion and some violence, the Tehuelche people established cordial relationships with the Welsh and helped the settlement survive the early food shortages. The settlers, led by Aaron Jenkins (whose wife Rachel was the first to bring up the idea of systematic use of irrigation canals), soon established Argentina's first irrigation system based on the Chubut River (in Welsh, Afon Camwy, 'winding river'), irrigating an area three or four miles (five or six km) to each side of the 50-mile (80 km) long stretch of river and creating Argentina's most fertile wheatlands. By 1885, wheat production had reached 6,000 tons, with wheat produced by the colony winning the gold medal at international expositions at Paris and Chicago.

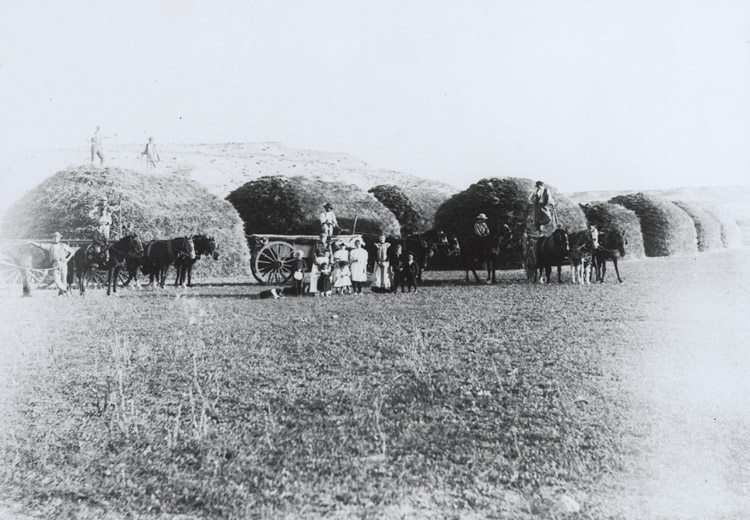
Harvest time in Patagonia, c.1880

The mouth of the Chubut River was difficult to navigate, being shallow and with shifting sandbanks, and it was decided that a railway was required to connect the Lower Chubut valley to Puerto Madryn (originally Porth Madryn) on the Golfo Nuevo on the southern side of the Valdes Peninsula. Lewis Jones was the driving force, and in 1884 the Argentine Congress authorized the construction of the Central Chubut Railway by Lewis Jones y Cía. Raising funds for the project locally proved difficult, so Lewis Jones went to the United Kingdom to seek funds, where he enlisted the assistance of Asahel P. Bell, an engineer. Work on the railway began in 1886, helped by the arrival of another 465 Welsh settlers on the steamer Vesta. The town that grew at the railhead was named Trelew (Town of Llew) in honour of Lewis Jones. The town grew rapidly and in 1888 became the headquarters of the Compañía Mercantil del Chubut (Chubut Trading Company). Initially the settlers were largely self-governing, with all men and women of 18 years of age or over having the right to vote.

In January 1868, the first newspaper of the colony, Y Brut (The Chronicle), appeared; Ein Breiniad (Our Privilege) followed in 1878. Both were short-lived, only six issues of each title being circulated. Lewis Jones established Y Drafod (The Discussion) in 1891, and this had greater longevity: a weekly issue was produced until 1961.

=== Expansion towards the Andes 1885–1902 ===
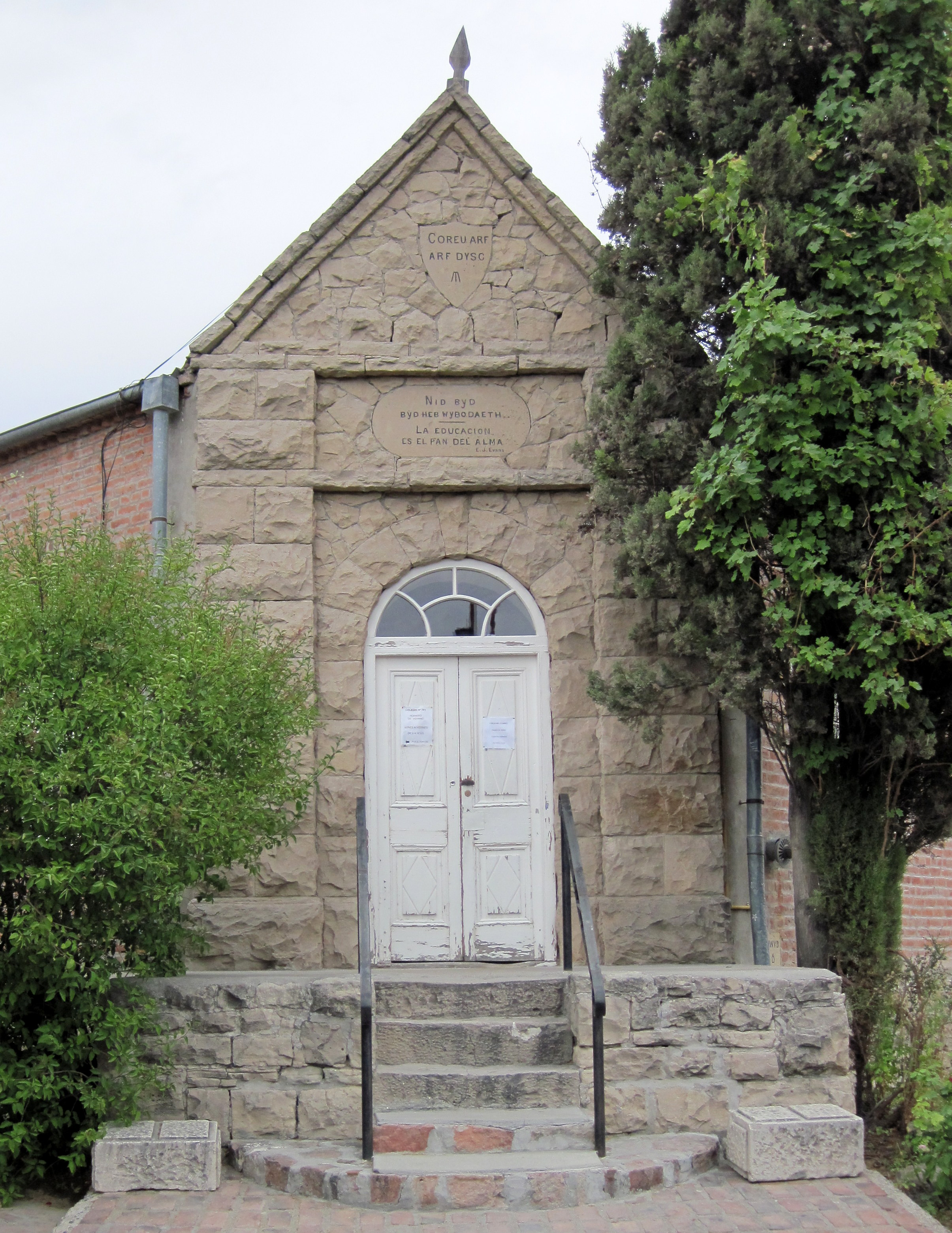
A Welsh school in Patagonia

By the mid-1880s most of the good agricultural land in the Lower Chubut valley had been claimed, and the colonists mounted a number of expeditions to explore other parts of Patagonia to seek more cultivable land. In 1885, the Welsh asked the governor of Chubut Province, Luis Jorge Fontana, for permission to arrange an expedition to explore the Andean part of Chubut. Fontana decided to accompany the expedition in person. By the end of November 1885 they had reached a fertile area which the Welsh named Cwm Hyfryd (Pleasant Valley). By 1888, this site at the foot of the Andes had become another Welsh settlement, named in Spanish Colonia 16 de Octubre. As the population grew here, the towns of Esquel and Trevelin were founded.

In 1893, a Welsh-language newspaper called Y Drafod (The Conversation) was founded by Lewis Jones to promote Welshness in Y Wladfa.

This area became the subject of the Cordillera of the Andes Boundary Case 1902 between Argentina and Chile. Initially the border was defined by a line connecting the highest peaks in the area, but it later became clear that this line was not the same as the line separating the watersheds, with some of the rivers in the area flowing westwards. Argentina and Chile agreed that the United Kingdom should act as arbitrator, and the views of the Welsh settlers were canvassed. In 1902, despite an offer of a league of land per family from Chile, they voted to remain in Argentina.

=== Setbacks in the Lower Chubut Valley 1899–1915 ===
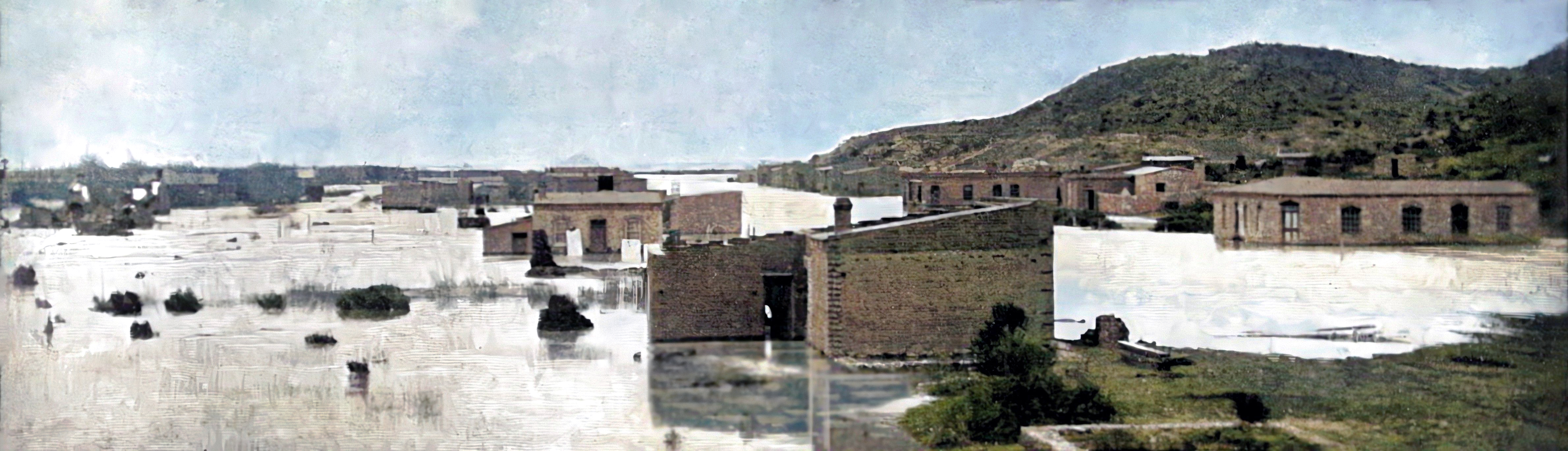
A flooded settlement in the Welsh colony

Serious damage was caused by floods in the 1890s and 1900s, which devastated Rawson and to a lesser extent Gaiman, though Trelew was not affected. There was also disagreement between the settlers and the government of Argentina, which introduced conscription and insisted on males of military age drilling on Sundays. This ran counter to the Sabbatarian principles of the settlers and caused much ill-feeling, though the matter was eventually resolved by the intervention of the president of Argentina, Julio Argentino Roca. These factors, and a lack of unclaimed farmable land, caused 234 people to leave for Liverpool aboard the Orissa on 14 May 1902, with 208 of them subsequently travelling to Canada, arriving at Saltcoats, Saskatchewan, in late June, although some of these families later returned to Chubut and later migrated to Australia. Some other settlers moved to Río Negro Province in Argentina. Many of those who left Chubut were late arrivals who had failed to obtain land of their own, and they were replaced by more immigrants from Wales. By the end of the 19th century there were some 4,000 people of Welsh descent living in Chubut. The last substantial migration from Wales took place shortly before World War I, which put a halt to further immigration. Approximately 1,000 Welsh immigrants arrived in Patagonia between 1886 and 1911; on the basis of this and other statistics, Glyn Williams estimated that perhaps no more than 2,300 Welsh people ever migrated directly to Patagonia.

=== Later development ===
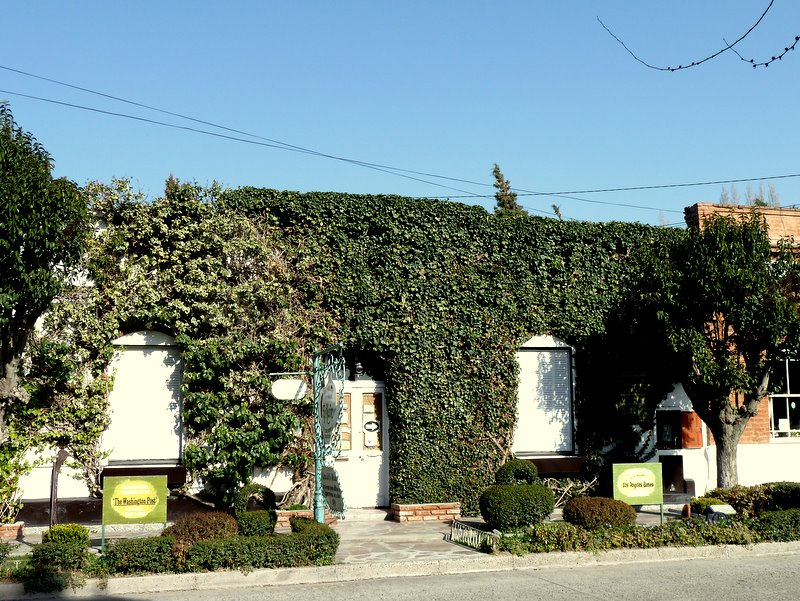
A Welsh tea house in Chubut

Immigration to the area after 1914 was mainly from Italy and other southern European countries. Welsh became a minority language. The creation in 1885 of a co-operative, the Cwmni Masnachol Camwy (Spanish: Compañía Mercantil de Chubut), was important. The Society traded on the settlers' behalf in Buenos Aires and acted as a bank with 14 branches. The cooperative society collapsed in the Great Depression of the 1930s. The construction of a dam on the Rio Chubut 120 kilometres (75 mi) west of Trelew, inaugurated on 19 April 1963, removed the risk of flooding in the Lower Chubut Valley.

The Welsh have left their mark on the landscape, with windmills and chapels across the province, including the distinctive wood and corrugated zinc Capel Salem in the Gaiman area and Trelew's Salon San David. Many settlements along the valley bear Welsh names.

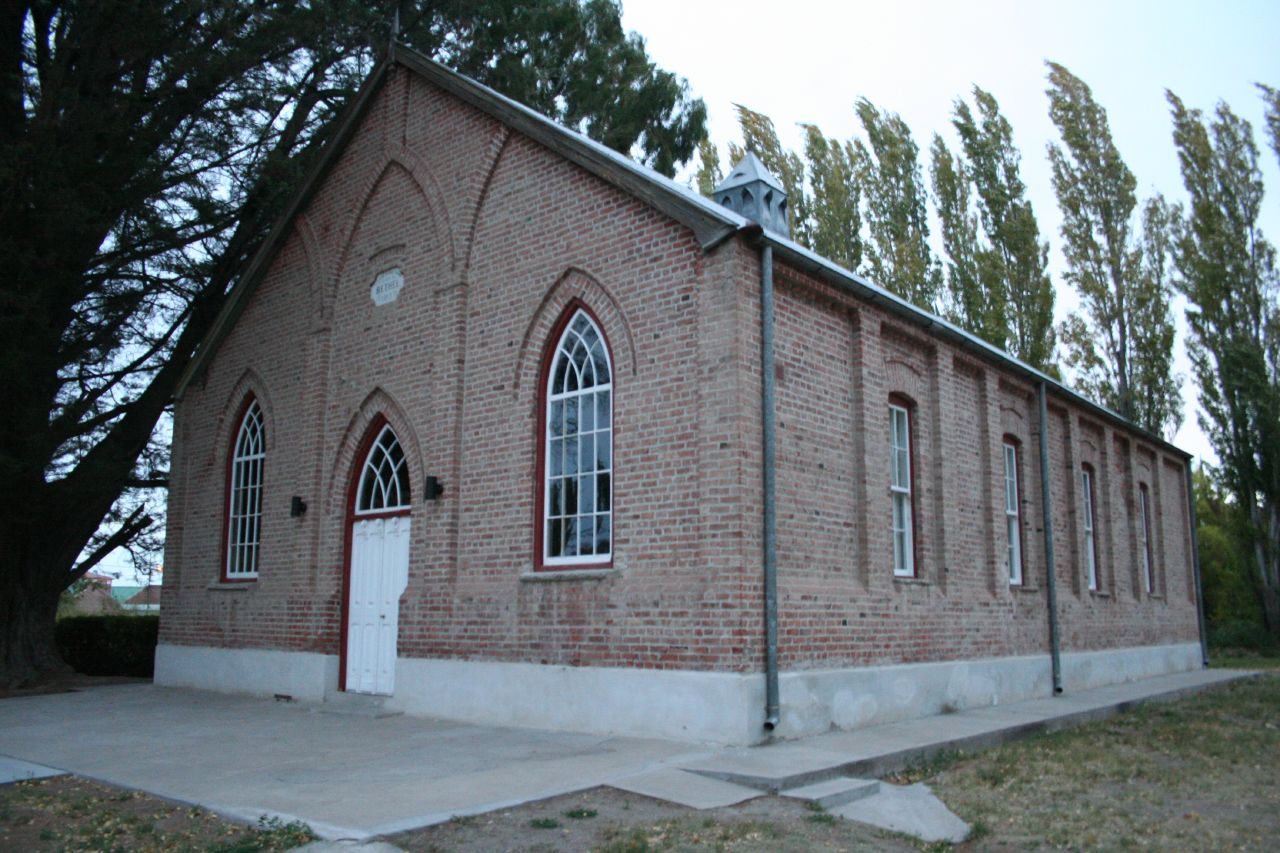
A Welsh chapel in Gaiman

During the British Government's repatriation of the 11,313 Argentine POWs taken during the 1982 Falklands War, Welsh-speaking British merchant seamen and British soldiers from the Welsh Guards were shocked to find themselves addressed in Patagonian Welsh by an Argentine POW who was on the way home to Puerto Madryn. Over the years since, close ties between Wales and Y Wladfa have been re-established.

A 2001 BBC article described in detail the recent visit to Chubut Province by Archdruid Meirion Evans and 30 members of the Gorsedd Cymru in order to revive the Gorsedd Y Wladfa in a ceremony held in a specially constructed stone circle near Gaiman.

Every year, the Eisteddfod festival takes place in the town of Trevelin. BBC reporters attended the 2001 Eisteddfod del Chubut at Trelew and watched as the Bardic Chair was awarded for the first time in Y Wladfa to a female poet: Gaiman hotel owner Monica Jones de Jones, for an Awdl on the subject of Rhyddid ("Freedom"). The article's author continued, "The Patagonia Eisteddfod itself, while sharing those elements common to Eisteddfodau in Wales itself, nonetheless is, in other respects, quite a different affair. As well as haunting Welsh folk tunes, and recitations in the unique Spanish-accented Welsh of the Patagonians, there are also rousing displays of Argentine folk dancing which owe everything to the culture of the gauchos and nothing to the somewhat tamer dance routines of the Welsh homeland."

Current Eisteddfod competitions are bilingual, in both Patagonian Welsh and Argentine Spanish, and include poetry, prose, literary translations (Welsh, Spanish, English, Italian, and French), musical performances, arts, folk dances, photography, and filmmaking among others. The Eisteddfod de la Juventud is held every September at Gaiman. The main Eisteddfod del Chubut is held every October at Trelew. Other annual eisteddfodau are held at Trevelin, in the Andes and at Puerto Madryn along the South Atlantic coast.

While visiting Patagonia to research his 2004 book The Last of the Celts, Marcus Tanner visited the Trelew home of local Welsh-language poet Geraint Edmunds. Edmunds was, according to Tanner, "a Welsh Patagonian of the old type, as fluent in Welsh as Spanish". During Tanner's visit, he noticed that "a beautifully made Bardic Chair", which Geraint Edmunds's poetry had won was on reverent display in the front room. To Tanner's disappointment, however, the bard's son, Eduardo Edmunds, would speak only Spanish and replied when asked about his ancestral language, "I think I'd rather learn English – more useful."

Since Welsh devolution, however, the Welsh Parliament in Cardiff has provided both funding and teachers to joint Welsh-Spanish immersion schools, such as Ysgol yr Hendre, in Chubut Province.

In 2006, the first of a two-Test tour to Argentina by the Wales national rugby union team was played in Puerto Madryn, which was a 27–25 win for Argentina. In 2019, 1,411 people undertook Welsh courses in the region, which was the highest number on record for the project. During 2023–24, there were over 970 registered learners (schools and adult learners) – a rise from 623 in 2020.

In 2014, Professor E. Wyn James of Cardiff University estimated that there were perhaps as many as 5,000 people in Patagonia who could speak Welsh.

On 28 July 2015, celebrations took place to celebrate the 150th anniversary of the Welsh migrations. The First Minister of Wales, Carwyn Jones, attended the celebration.

In October 2015, the BBC National Orchestra of Wales undertook an historic visit to Y Wladfa to give two concerts in a newly refurbished concert hall, that had previously been a wool factory on the outskirts of Trelew. These performances attracted thousands of local visitors and helped celebrate the 150th anniversary of the Welsh migration. Welsh harpist Catrin Finch and conductor Grant Llewelyn were part of the concerts.

== Welsh relationship with Indigenous people ==
The Welsh settlers to Patagonia settled on Indigenous Tehuelche land. The Welsh were able to survive and thrive by bartering Welsh bread for meat, by learning from Tehuelche people how to hunt, and by learning from the Tehuelche how to irrigate their fields with water from the Chubut River.

== Welsh language names for Argentine places ==
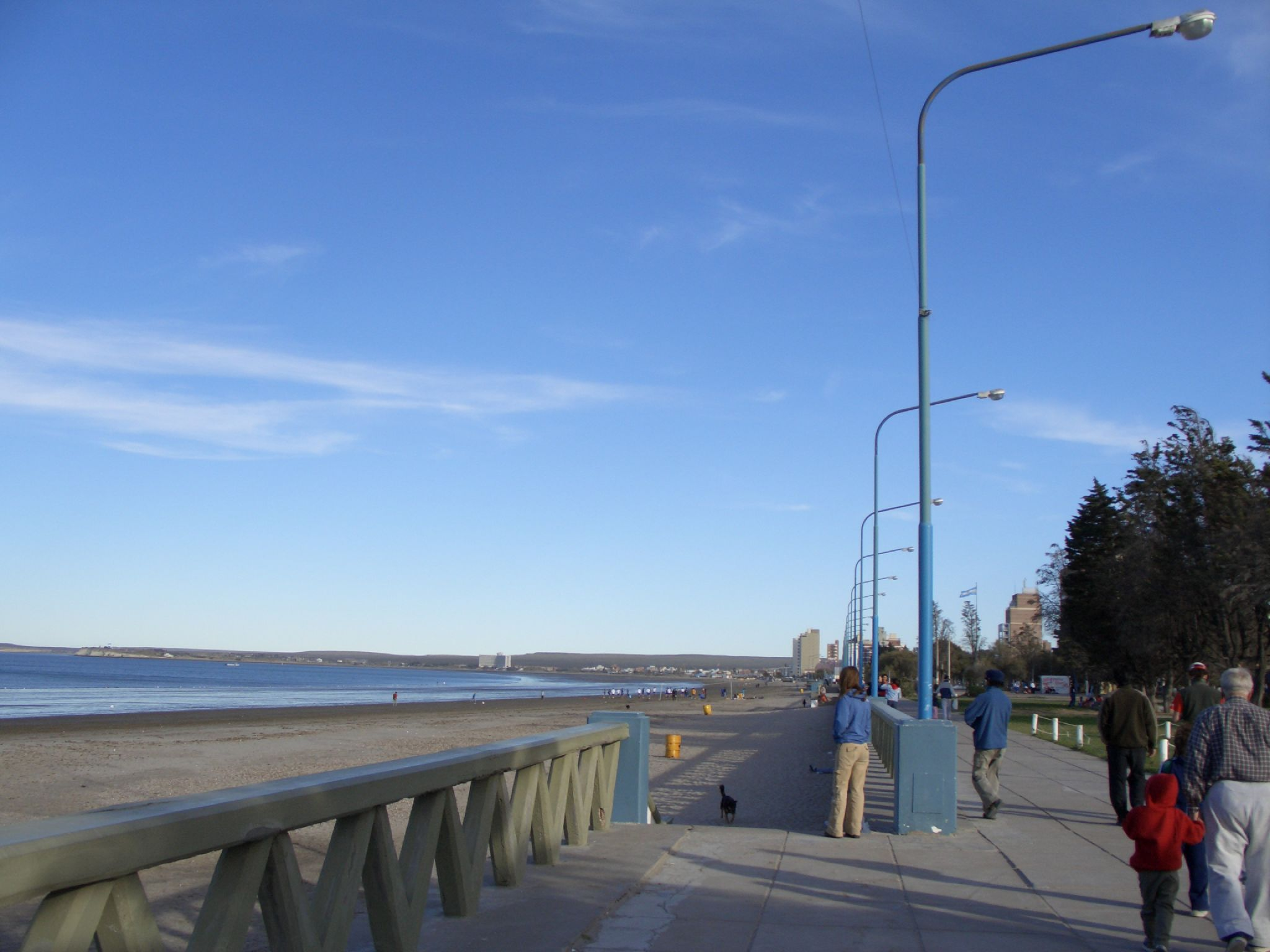
The beach at Puerto Madryn

Spanish	Welsh	English translation of Welsh name
Argentina	Yr Ariannin	Argentina
Villa La Angostura	Lle Cul	narrow place
Arroyo Pescado	Nant y Pysgod	fish stream
Colonia 16 de Octubre	Cwm Hyfryd/Bro Hydref	beautiful valley/October community
Fuerte Aventura	Caer Antur	fort adventure
Paso de Indios	Rhyd yr Indiaid	Indians' ford
Las Plumas	Dôl y Plu	meadow of the feathers
Puerto Madryn	Porth Madryn	(Port Madryn)
Rawson	Trerawson	(Rawson)
Río Chubut (from Tehuelche 'Chupat', meaning 'shining, glinting')	Afon Camwy	swirling river
Río Corintos	Aber Gyrants	turning estuary
Valle de los Mártires	Dyffryn y Merthyron	valley of the martyrs
Valle Frío	Dyffryn Oer	cold valley
Trelew	Tre Lew(is)	Lew's town
Dolavon	Dôl Afon	river meadow
Trevelin	Tre Felin	mill town

== Map ==
Welsh speaking settlements in Chubut

== Anthem ==
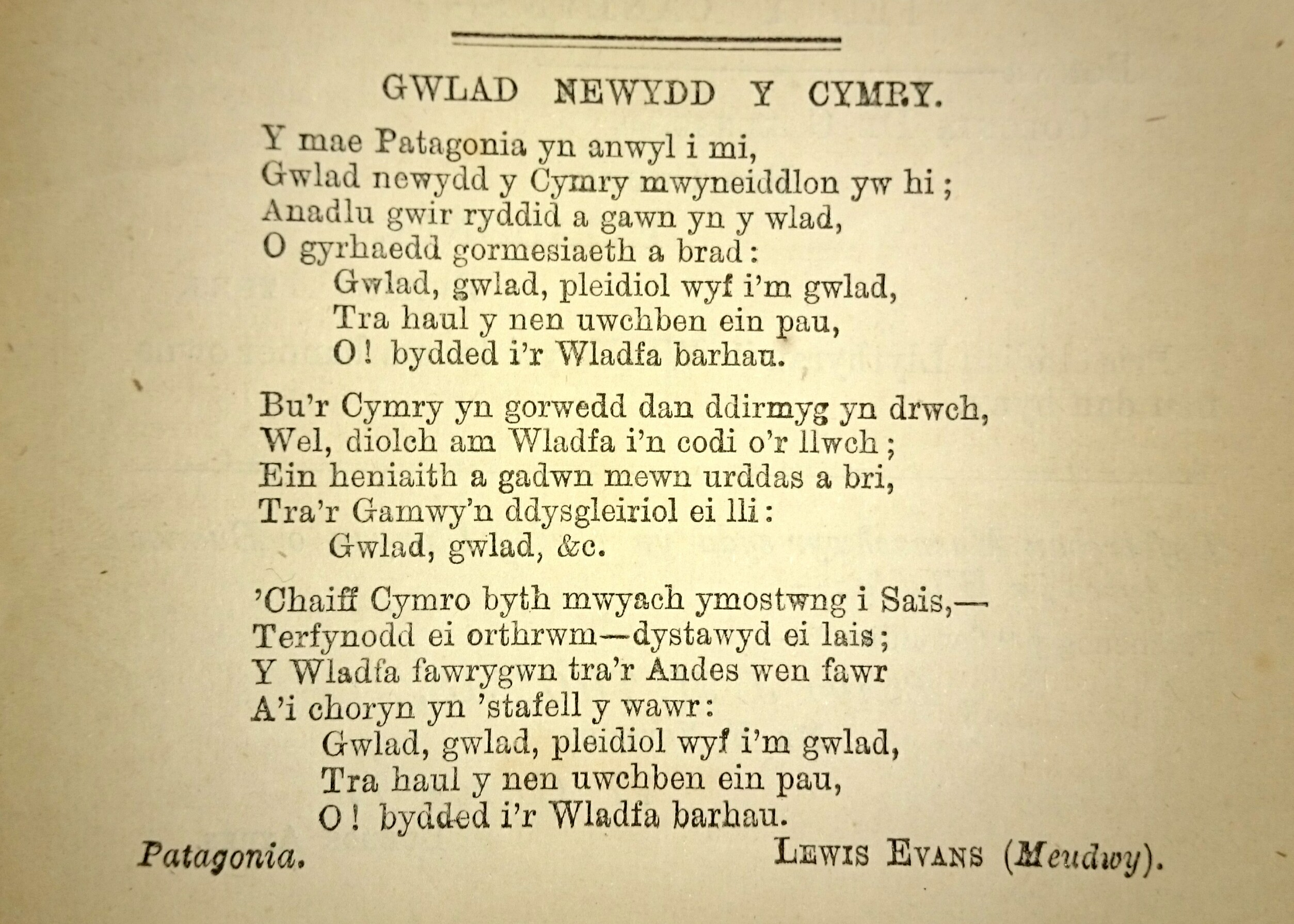
A printed version of Gwlad Newydd y Cymry

Y Wladfa's anthem is a re-working of the Welsh anthem, "Hen Wlad Fy Nhadau", called "Gwlad Newydd y Cymry" ('"The New Country of the Welsh"'). The new anthem was penned by Lewis Evans and is sung to the same tune as "Hen Wlad Fy Nhadau".

== Popular culture ==
Patagonia is a 2011 film about the Welsh settlement in Argentina.

In the BBC's 2015 Patagonia with Huw Edwards, Huw Edwards travelled to Patagonia and met with descendants of the original settlers, to discuss what had survived of the uniquely Welsh culture their ancestors aimed to protect.

== See also ==
- Eluned Morgan (author)
- Irish Argentine
- Richard Bryn Williams
- Conquest of the Desert
- Scottish Argentine
- Spanish colonization attempt of the Strait of Magellan
- Thomas Benbow Phillips
- Welsh settlement in the Americas
- Welsh Tract
- A Swiftly Tilting Planet
- Patagonia (film)

== Other sources ==
- Western Mail (Cardiff, Wales). 27 Dec 2004. Patagonia Welsh to watch S4C shows.
- Glyn Williams (1975). The desert and the dream: a study of Welsh colonization in Chubut 1865–1915. University of Wales Press. ISBN 978-0-7083-0579-9.
- R. Bryn Williams (2000). Gwladfa Patagonia 1865–2000 = La colonia galesa de Patagonia 1865–2000 = The Welsh colony in Patagonia 1865–2000. Gwasg Carreg Gwalch. ISBN 978-0-86381-653-6.
- Walter Ariel Brooks, 'Welsh print culture in y Wladfa: The role of ethnic newspapers in Welsh Patagonia, 1868–1933' (Cardiff University PhD thesis, 2012) - https://orca.cf.ac.uk/46450/1/WelshPrintCultureInYWladfaWalterBrooks.pdf
- E. Wyn James, ‘Identity, Immigration, and Assimilation: The Case of the Welsh Settlement in Patagonia’, Transactions of the Honourable Society of Cymmrodorion, 24 (2018), 76–87. ISSN 0959-3632: http://www.cymmrodorion.org/wp-content/uploads/woocommerce_uploads/2021/01/Identinty-Immigration-and-assimilation-exkg90.pdf
- E. Wyn James, ‘Songs and Identity in Welsh Patagonia’, Studia Ethnologica Pragensia, 1/2023, 85–96. ISSN 1803-9812 (Print); ISSN 2336-6699 (Online): https://studiaethnologicapragensia.ff.cuni.cz/en/magazin/2023-1-2/
