= Trelew =

- City
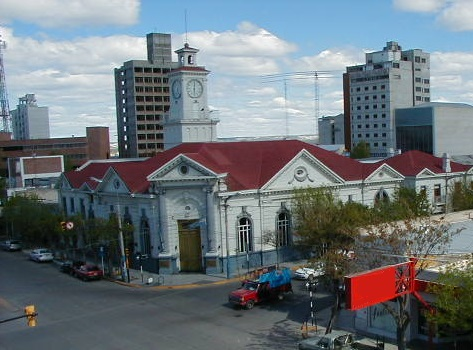
- Trelew city centre

- Coat of arms

- Location of Trelew in Argentina Trelew (Argentina)
- Coordinates: 43°15′S 65°18′W
- Country: Argentina
- Province: Chubut
- Department: Rawson
- Founded: October 20, 1886
- Founder: Lewis Jones

Government
  - Intendant: Gerardo Merino (UCR)

Area
  - Total: 249 km^{2} (96 sq mi)
- Elevation: 11 m (36 ft)

Population (2010 census)
  - Total: 97,915
  - Density: 393/km^{2} (1,020/sq mi)
- Demonym: Trelewense
- Time zone: UTC−3 (ART)
- CPA base: U9100
- Dialing code: +54 280
- Climate: BWk

Trelew (Spanish pronunciation: [tɾeˈlew], from Welsh: tref "town" and the name of the founder, Lewis Jones) is a city in the eastern part of the Chubut Province of Argentina, 21km away from the coast. Located in Patagonia, the city is the largest and most populous in the low valley of the Chubut River, with 97,915 inhabitants as of 2010. The Trelew municipality is part of the Rawson Department, whose capital, Rawson, is also the provincial capital.

Trelew is an important commercial and industrial centre for the region and is the main hub for wool processing, accounting for 90 percent of activity in Argentina. The produce of this industry is mainly shipped and exported through Puerto Madryn and Puerto Deseado.

Trelew is home to the Museum of Paleontology Egidio Feruglio, showcasing the paleontological heritage of the Patagonic region, and considered one of the most important of its kind in South America. It also has an Astronomic and Planetary Observatory.

The city is served by the Almirante Marcos A. Zar Airport, of both civilian and military use. The airport's runway is shared with the Almirante Zar Naval Base, home of the Lockheed P-3 Orion squadron of the Argentine Naval Aviation.

== History ==
Trelew's foundation is linked with Welsh settlement in Argentina, the leaders of which were Captain Sir Thomas Duncombe Love Jones-Parry (of Madryn) and Lewis (Luis) Jones, who acted as spokesmen to deal with the Argentine government in the beginning of the 1860s. The town was named Trelew in honour of the latter Jones: tre meaning "town" in Welsh and "Lew" being an apocope for Lewis.

Trelew was established on 20 October 1886 as the starting point for the Central Chubut Railway line that would link the lower Chubut River Valley to Puerto Madryn. Railway building equipment and 400 settlers arrived on July 28 of that same year on the steamer Vesta. The line was opened in 1888 and later extended from Trelew to Gaiman, Dolavon and finally to Las Plumas. In 1961, the line was closed.

=== 1972 massacre ===
Trelew was the scene of a massacre in 1972. A breakout of political prisoners at the federal penitentiary resulted in the death of one guard and the attempted flight of about 100 individuals who opposed the military dictatorship which followed the overthrow of President Arturo Illia. A small group of prisoners succeeded in commandeering a plane and flying to safety in Chile. The rest submitted to the authorities and were returned to a military prison, where 19 were shot (three survived).

The town of Trelew was searched by the military and locals were seized and taken to the Villa Devoto prison in Buenos Aires. Virtually the entire town went on strike and succeeded in securing the release of the prisoners at Villa Devoto. These incidents were documented in the book La Pasión según Trelew, by Tomás Eloy Martínez, which was originally published in 1973, but was then suppressed by the dictatorship of the Proceso, and reissued in 1997.

== Tourism ==
Trelew is the centre of tourism in the Central Meseta, the Valley of the Chubut River and the coast. Punta Tombo, the biggest penguin reserve in Argentina, is accessible from the city.

An annual Eisteddfod is held in Trelew in October, a traditional festival which receives guests from across the country and from Wales, which constitutes a unique expression of Welsh culture in South America.

The former Trelew railway station, which was declared a national historic monument in 1969, has functioned as a museum, El Museo Regional Pueblo de Luis, since 1984.

== Sports ==
Racing de Trelew and Huracán de Trelew are the most important local football clubs. Patoruzú Rugby Club and Trelew Rugby Club are the local clubs practicing this sport. In boxing, the Matthysse brothers, Lucas and Walter, are from Trelew, although most of their notable fights took place in the United States.

== Gallery ==
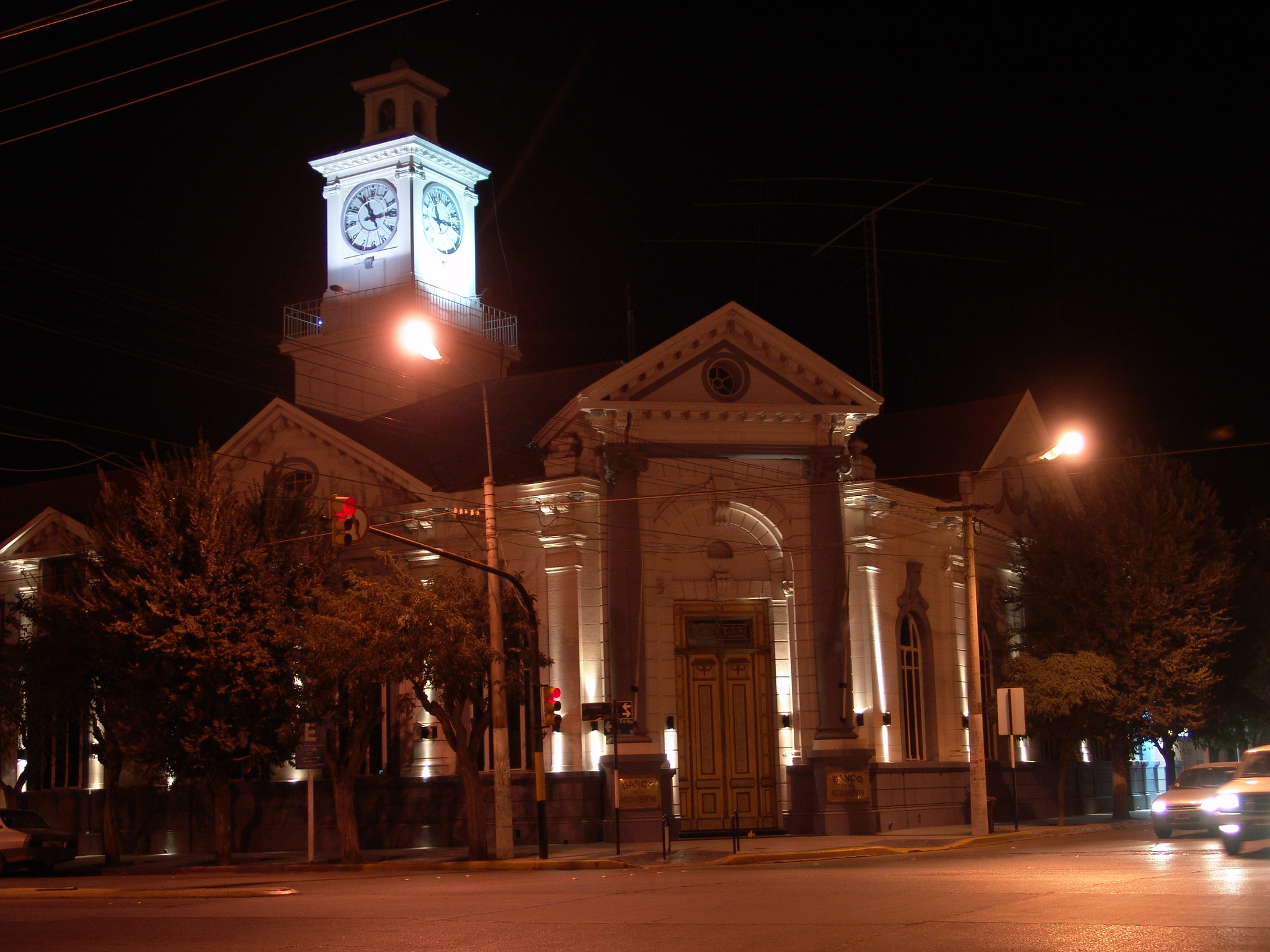
Argentina National Bank at night

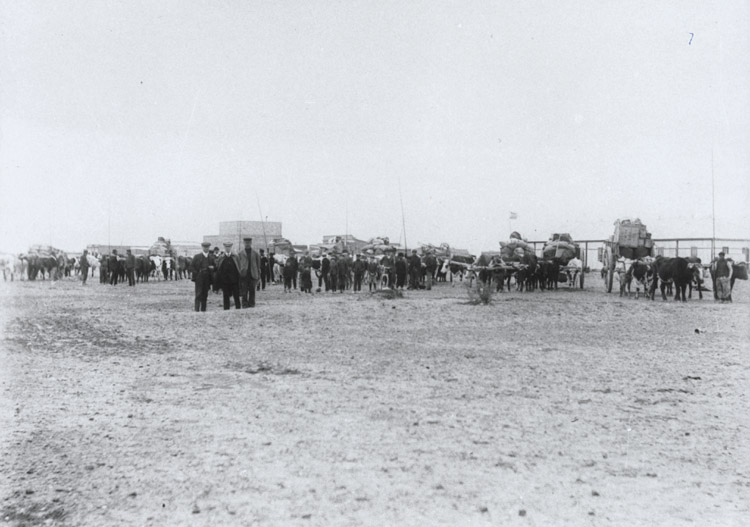
A train of ox-drawn carts leaving Trelew, c. 1880

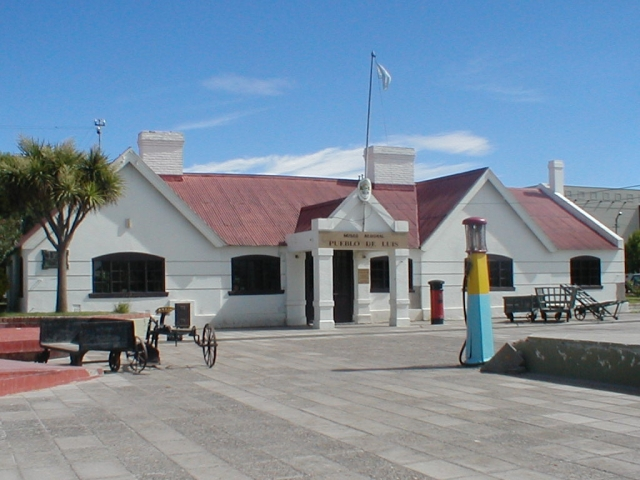
Welsh People's Museum, Trelew

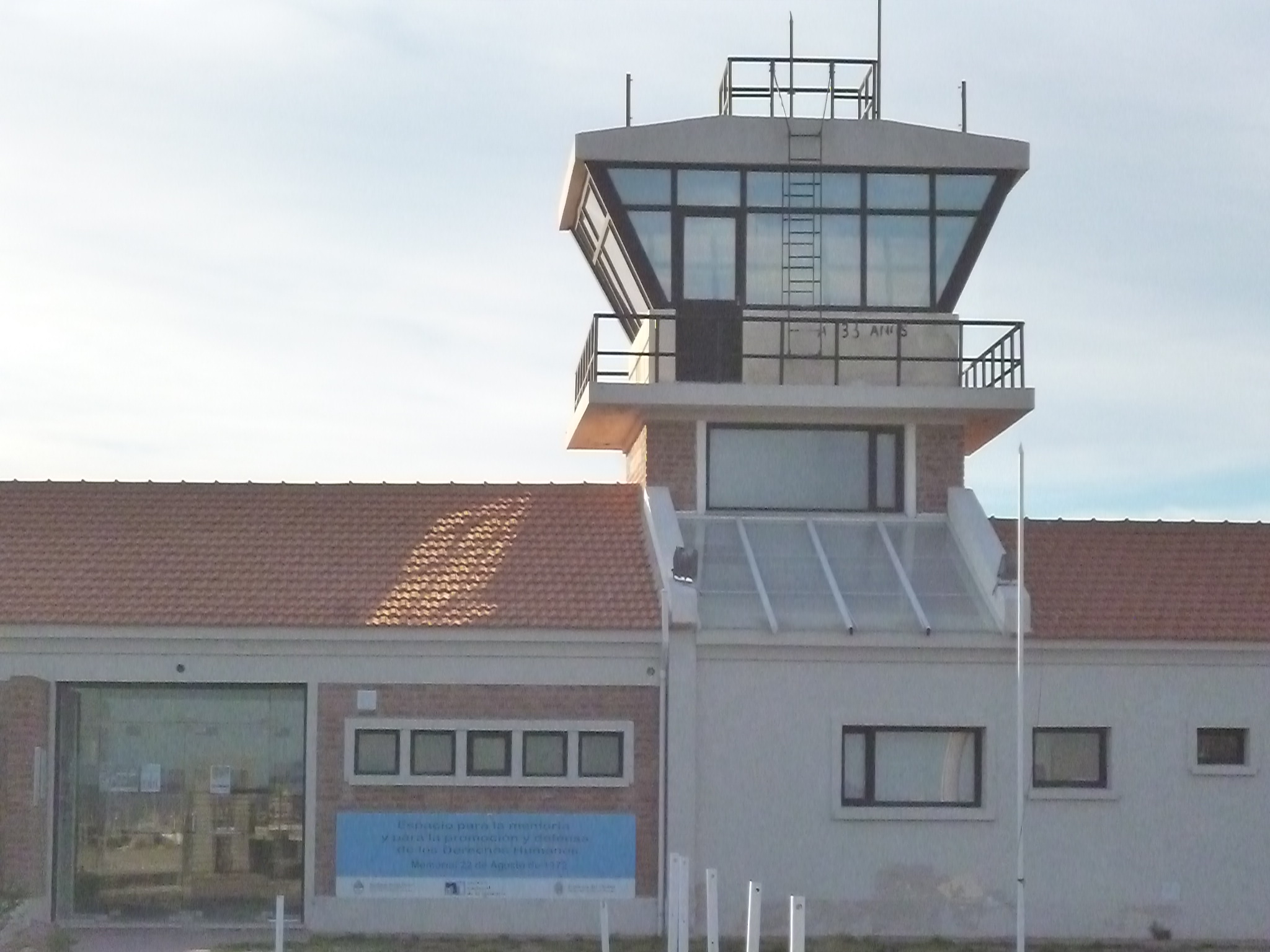
Former Airport of Trelew, now a "cultural centre for the memory".

== Climate ==
According to the Köppen climate classification, Trelew experiences a cold semi-desert climate (BSk) bordering on a cold desert climate (BWk), with warm summers, cold winters and low precipitation year-round.

Climate data for Trelew/Rawson (1991–2020, extremes 1901–present)
Month	Jan	Feb	Mar	Apr	May	Jun	Jul	Aug	Sep	Oct	Nov	Dec	Year
Record high °C (°F)	43.6 (110.5)	41.0 (105.8)	40.0 (104.0)	35.3 (95.5)	31.0 (87.8)	27.7 (81.9)	25.6 (78.1)	27.4 (81.3)	33.0 (91.4)	36.4 (97.5)	38.3 (100.9)	41.2 (106.2)	43.6 (110.5)
Mean daily maximum °C (°F)	29.3 (84.7)	28.0 (82.4)	25.4 (77.7)	21.0 (69.8)	16.1 (61.0)	12.6 (54.7)	12.4 (54.3)	15.0 (59.0)	17.6 (63.7)	21.2 (70.2)	24.8 (76.6)	27.5 (81.5)	20.9 (69.6)
Daily mean °C (°F)	21.6 (70.9)	20.2 (68.4)	17.9 (64.2)	13.5 (56.3)	9.5 (49.1)	6.4 (43.5)	5.9 (42.6)	8.0 (46.4)	10.4 (50.7)	14.1 (57.4)	17.4 (63.3)	20.0 (68.0)	13.7 (56.7)
Mean daily minimum °C (°F)	13.7 (56.7)	12.6 (54.7)	10.8 (51.4)	7.0 (44.6)	3.6 (38.5)	1.0 (33.8)	0.3 (32.5)	1.9 (35.4)	3.7 (38.7)	6.6 (43.9)	9.6 (49.3)	12.0 (53.6)	6.9 (44.4)
Record low °C (°F)	3.0 (37.4)	1.5 (34.7)	−1.6 (29.1)	−4.9 (23.2)	−10.7 (12.7)	−13.2 (8.2)	−13.2 (8.2)	−10.6 (12.9)	−8.0 (17.6)	−5.0 (23.0)	−2.0 (28.4)	0.5 (32.9)	−13.2 (8.2)
Average precipitation mm (inches)	11.9 (0.47)	23.5 (0.93)	21.0 (0.83)	23.3 (0.92)	22.6 (0.89)	25.4 (1.00)	17.4 (0.69)	14.1 (0.56)	14.7 (0.58)	18.1 (0.71)	12.9 (0.51)	13.2 (0.52)	218.1 (8.59)
Average precipitation days (≥ 0.1 mm)	3.9	4.3	5.2	3.8	6.6	6.8	5.6	6.1	5.9	5.7	4.6	3.7	62.1
Average snowy days	0.0	0.0	0.0	0.0	0.1	0.2	0.5	0.2	0.1	0.0	0.0	0.0	1.0
Average relative humidity (%)	42.1	49.8	52.9	56.9	65.0	67.5	66.3	59.7	56.0	49.7	44.4	41.4	54.3
Mean monthly sunshine hours	322.4	279.7	251.1	210.0	161.2	138.0	161.2	179.8	198.0	248.0	282.0	294.5	2,725.9
Mean daily sunshine hours	10.4	9.9	8.1	7.0	5.2	4.6	5.2	5.8	6.6	8.0	9.4	9.5	7.5
Percentage possible sunshine	67.0	69.3	65.3	60.3	51.3	50.0	47.3	53.7	55.0	59.7	65.0	55.3	58.3
Source 1: Servicio Meteorológico Nacional
Source 2: Meteo Climat (record highs and lows) Secretaria de Mineria (percent sun 1941–1990, April, August and December record highs, and May record low only)

== Notable people ==
- María Sonia Cristoff, author
- Omar Andrés Narváez, boxer
- Juan Ignacio Antonio, footballer
- Lucas Matthysse, boxer
- Walter Matthysse, boxer
- Gustavo Caamaño, footballer
- Matías Jara, footballer
- Franco Niell, footballer
- Daniel Pérez, footballer
- Valentina Bassi, actress
- Pablo Morant, footballer

== International relations ==
Trelew is twinned with:

- Covilhã, Portugal
- Albidona, Italy
- Caernarfon, Wales

== See also ==
- Omega Tower Trelew
- Welsh settlement in Argentina

== Sources ==
- La Pasión según Trelew, Espejo de la Argentina, (c) 1997, Editorial Planeta Argentina S.A.I.C.; Third Edition: April 2000, Buenos Aires, ISBN 950-742-859-3
