= Michael D. Jones =

Welsh minister, college principal and founder of Y Wladfa

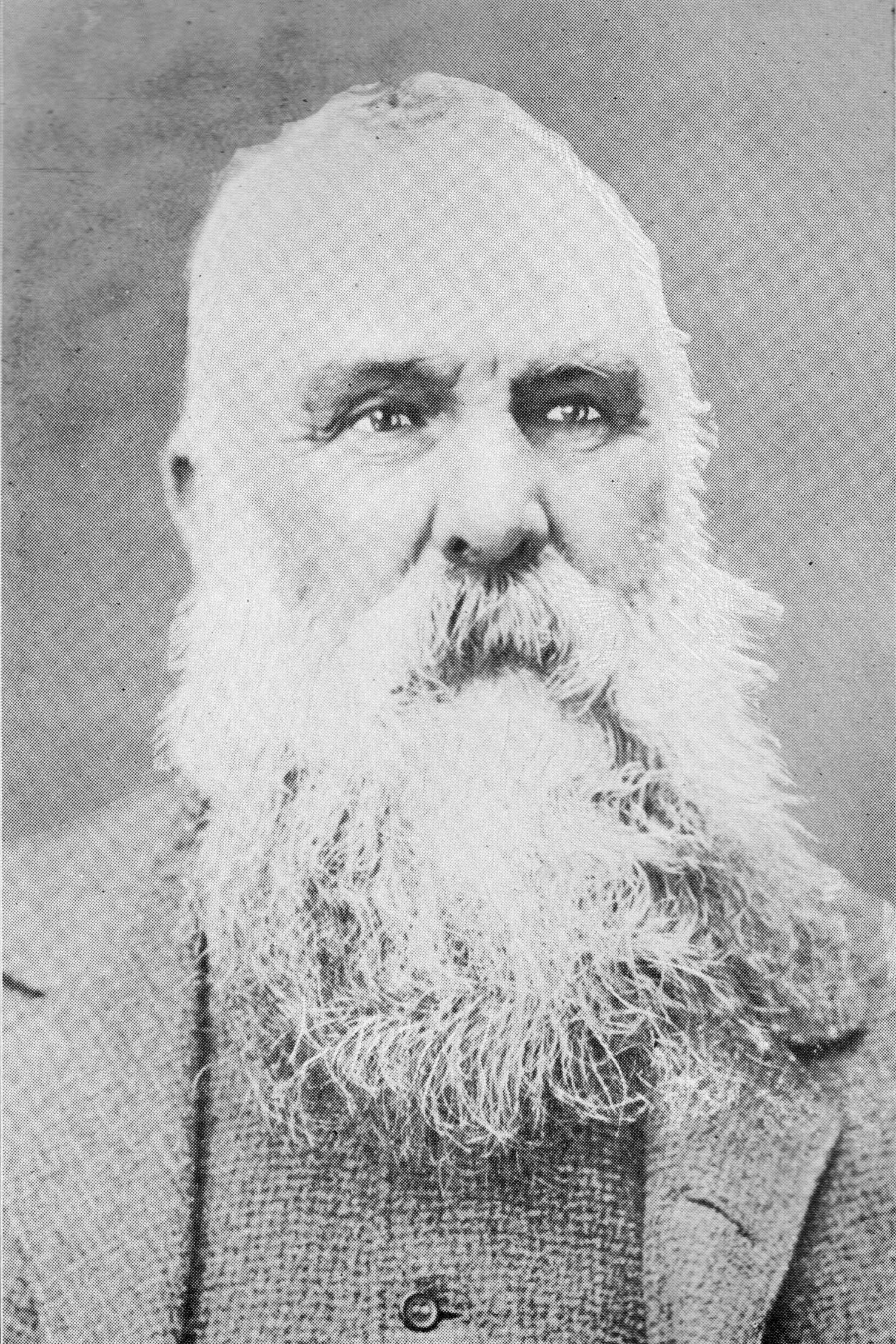
- Born: Michael Daniel Jones; 2 March 1822; Llanuwchllyn, Meirionydd, Wales
- Died: 2 December 1898 (aged 76); Bala, Meirionydd, Wales
- Occupations: Welsh Congregationalist minister, principal of a theological college, founder of the Welsh settlement in Patagonia known as Y Wladfa, one of the fathers of modern Welsh nationalism. Poet and writer.
- Spouse: Anne Lloyd (m. 1859–1898, his death)
- Children: Llwyd Ap Iwan (1862–1909); Mihangel Ap Iwan; Myfanwy Jones; Maironwen Jones

Michael Daniel Jones (2 March 1822 – 2 December 1898) was a Welsh Congregationalist minister and principal of a theological college, but is best remembered as a founder of the Welsh settlement in Patagonia known as Y Wladfa and as one of the fathers of modern Welsh nationalism.

Jones was born in Llanuwchllyn, Merioneth (Gwynedd) in 1822. After training for the ministry at the Presbyterian College in Carmarthen and afterwards at Highbury College, London, he spent about eighteen months in Cincinnati, Ohio, where he was ordained to the Christian ministry. He returned to Wales and in 1850 he was inducted minister at Bwlchnewydd and Gibeon in Carmarthenshire, before succeeding his father as the principal of Bala Independent College in 1855.

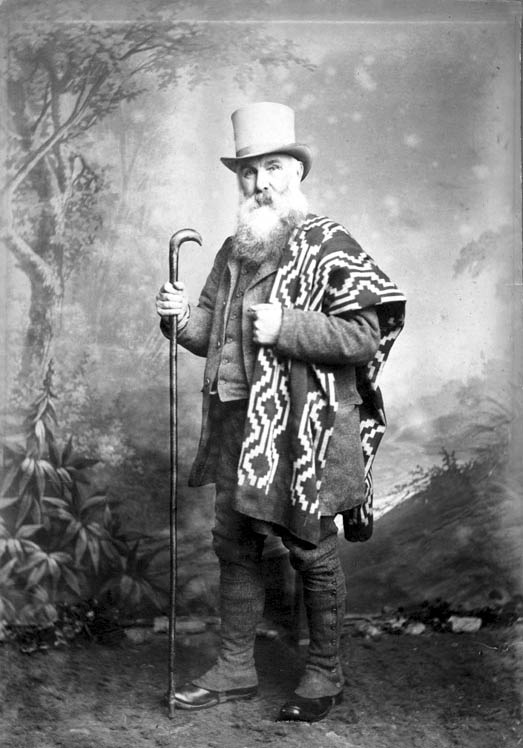
The Rev. Michael D. Jones (1822-98)

His name is closely linked with the attempt to establish a Welsh settlement in Patagonia, Argentina, in the 1860s where Welsh would be the language of religion, government, trade, and education. The 150th anniversary (28 July 1865) of this Welsh-Argentine settlement in Rawson, Chubut Argentina was celebrated in 2015.

In 1889, Jones became a member of the first Merionethshire County Council, although he had a majority of only eight votes over his Conservative opponent.

Jones is recognised as the first to advocate a political solution to defending Welsh identity and therefore is seen as one of the most significant forerunners of Welsh nationalism.

== Sources ==
- See also the collections of essays on his life and work, Michael D. Jones a'i Wladfa Gymreig, ed. E. Wyn James and Bill Jones (Llanrwst: Gwasg Carreg Gwalch, 2009).
- Evans, Meredydd (2001). "Papur Pan" (PDF). Traethodydd (in Welsh). CLVI (658): 142–55.
- Dafydd Tudur, 'The Life, Thought and Work of Michael Daniel Jones (1822-1898)', University of Wales, Bangor, PhD thesis, 2006.
- E. Wyn James, 'Michael D. Jones and His Visit to Patagonia in 1882', in Los Galeses en la Patagonia V, ed. Fernando Coronato & Marcelo Gavirati (Puerto Madryn, Chubut, Argentina: Asociación Punta Cuevas, Asociación Cultural Galesa de Puerto Madryn & Centro de Estudios Históricos y Sociales de Puerto Madryn, 2012. ISBN 978-987-24577-3-0. In English and in Spanish.
- Jones, Ieuan Gwynedd (1981). Explorations and Explanations. Essays in the Social History of Victorian Wales. Llandysul: Gomer. ISBN 0850886449.
