= Welsh exonyms =

The modern Welsh language contains names for many towns and other geographical features in Great Britain and elsewhere. Names for places outside of Welsh-speaking regions are exonyms, not including spelling or pronunciation adaptations and translations of common nouns.

Names not in italics are dated or obsolete.

== Argentina ==
Argentina Yr Ariannin
English name	Welsh name	Spanish name	Notes
Arroyo Pescado	Nant y Pysgod	Arroyo Pescado	
Cajón de Ginebra	Bocs Gin	Cajón de Ginebra	
Cerro Cóndor	Craig yr Eryr	Cerro Cóndor	
Cerro Trono de las Nubes	Gorsedd y Cwmwl	Cerro Trono de las Nubes	
Chico River	Afon Fach	Rio Chico	
Chubut River	Afon Camwy	Rio Chubut	
Colonia 16 de Octubre	Cwm Hyfryd, Bro Hydref	Colonia 16 de Octubre	
Desvío km 22	Tŵr Joseph	Desvío km 22	
Dolavon	Dol Afon	Dolavon	
Estación Laguna Grande	Llyn Mawr	Estación Laguna Grande	
Florentino Ameghino Dam	Yr Argae	Dique Florentino Ameghino	
Fuerte Aventura	Caer Antur	Fuerte Aventura	
Laguna de Aaron	Llyn Aaron	Laguna de Aaron	
Laguna de Agnia	Llyn Ania	Laguna de Agnia	
La Angostura	Lle Cul	La Angostura	
Las Plumas	Dôl y Plu	Las Plumas	
Loma Blanca	Bryn Gwyn	Loma Blanca	
Luis Beltrán	Tir Pentre	Luis Beltrán	
Paso de Indios	Rhyd yr Indiaid	Paso de Indios	
Pampa de Agnia	Pant y Ffwdan	Pampa de Agnia	
Puerto Madryn	Porth Madryn	Puerto Madryn	
Rawson	Trerawson	Rawson	
Río Corrintos	Aber Gyrants	Río Corrintos	
Tecka	Hafn Lâs	Tecka	
Trelew	Tre Lew(is)	Trelew	
Trevelin	Tre Felin	Trevelin	
Valle de los Mártires	Dyffryn y Merthyron	Valle de los Mártires	
Valle Frío	Dyffryn Oer	Valle Frío	
Valle 16 de octubre	Cwm Hyfryd/Bro Hydref	Valle 16 de octubre	
Veintiocho de Julio	Tir Halen	Veintiocho de Julio	

== Australia ==
Australia Awstralia
English name	Welsh name	Endonyms		Notes
English name	Welsh name	Name	Language	Notes
Jervis Bay Territory	Tiriogaeth Bae Jervis	Jervis Bay Territory	English	
Kangaroo Island	Ynys Cangarŵ	Kangaroo Island	English	
Kangaroo Island	Ynys Cangarŵ	Karta Pintingga	Kaurna	
Lord Howe Island	Ynys yr Arglwydd Howe	Lord Howe Island	English	
New South Wales	De Cymru Newydd	New South Wales	English	
Northern Territory	Tiriogaeth y Gogledd	Northern Territory	English	
South Australia	De Awstralia	South Australia	English	
Australian Capital Territory	Tiriogaeth Prifddinas Awstralia	Australian Capital Territory	English	
Western Australia	Gorllewin Awstralia	Western Australia	English	

== Belgium ==
Belgium Gwlad Belg
English name	Welsh name	Endonyms		Notes
English name	Welsh name	Name	Language	Notes
Antwerp	Antwerp	Antwerpen	Dutch	
Brussels	Brwsel	Bruxelles	French	
Brussels	Brwsel	Brussel	Dutch	
East Flanders	Dwyrain Fflandrys	Oost-Vlaanderen	Dutch	
Flanders	Fflandrys	Vlaanderen	Dutch	
Flanders	Fflandrys	Vloandern	West Flemish	
Flanders	Fflandrys	Vlaondere	Limburgish	
Flemish Brabant	Brabant Fflandrysaidd	Vlaams Brabant	Dutch	
Hainaut	Hanawt	Hainaut	French	
Hainaut	Hanawt	Hénau	Picard	
Hainaut	Hanawt	Hinnot	Walloon	
Limburg	Limbwrg	Limburg	Dutch	
Limburg	Limbwrg	Wes-Limburg	Limburgish	
Limbourg	Limbwrg	Limbourg	French	
Limbourg	Limbwrg	Limbôr	Walloon	
Luxembourg	Lwcsembwrg	Luxembourg	French	
Luxembourg	Lwcsembwrg	Lëtzebuerg	Luxembourgish	
Luxembourg	Lwcsembwrg	Lussimbork	Walloon	
Wallonia	Walonia	Wallonie	French	
Wallonia	Walonia	Wallonien	German	
Wallonia	Walonia	Waloneye	Walloon	
Wallonia	Walonia	Walonnie	Picard	
Wallonia	Walonia	Wallounien	Luxembourgish	
Walloon Brabant	Brabant Walonaidd	Brabant wallon	French	
Walloon Brabant	Brabant Walonaidd	Roman Payis	Walloon	
West Flanders	Gorllewin Fflandrys	West-Vlaanderen	Dutch	
West Flanders	Gorllewin Fflandrys	West-Vloandern	West Flemish	

== Canada ==
Canada
English name	Welsh name	Endonyms	Notes
British Columbia	Columbia Brydeinig	British Columbia; Columbie Britannique	
Newfoundland	Tir Newydd	Newfoundland; Terre-Neuve; Ktaqmkuk	
Newfoundland and Labrador	Tir Newydd a Labrador	Newfoundland and Labrador; Terre-Neuve et Labrador	
Nova Scotia	Yr Alban Newydd	Nova Scotia; Nouvelle-Écosse; Alba Nuadh; Nopa Sko'sia	

== Czech Republic ==
Czech Republic Y Weriniaeth Tsiec
English name	Welsh name	Endonym	Notes
Moravia	Morafia	Morava	
Prague	Prag	Praha	

== Egypt ==
Egypt Yr Aifft
English name	Welsh name	Endonym	Notes
Alexandria	Alecsandria	al-Iskandariyya (الإسكندرية)	

== France ==
France Ffrainc
English name	Welsh name	Endonyms		Notes
English name	Welsh name	Name	Language	Notes
Alps	Alpau, Mynydd Mynnau	Alpes	French	
Alsace	Alsás	Alsace	French	
Anjou	Angyw, Aensio	Anjou	French	
Aquitaine	Acwitania	Aquitaine	French	
Auvergne	Afarn	Auvergne	French	
Brittany	Llydaw	Breizh	Breton	
Brittany	Llydaw	Bretagne	French	
Brittany	Llydaw	Bertaèyn	Gallo	
Burgundy	Bwrgwyn	Bourgogne	French	
Champagne	Siampaen	Champagne	French	
Gascony	Gasgwyn	Gascogne	French	
Gascony	Gasgwyn	Gasconha	Gascon	
Gascony	Gasgwyn	Gaskoinia	Basque	
Maine	Maen	Maine	French	
Normandy	Normandi, Norddmandi	Normandie	French	
Normandy	Normandi, Norddmandi	Normaundie	Norman	
Picardy	Picardi	Picardie	French, Picard	
Provence	Profens	Provence	French	
Savoy	Safwy	Savoie	French	
Strasbourg	Strasbwrg	Strasbourg	French	
Strasbourg	Strasbwrg	Straßburg	German	

== Germany ==
Germany Yr Almaen
English name	Welsh name	Endonym		Notes
English name	Welsh name	Name	Language	Notes
Bavaria	Bafaria	Bayern	Bavarian, German	
Cologne	Cwlen	Kölle	Colognian	
Cologne	Cwlen	Köln	German	
Hamburg	Hambwrg	Hamburg		

== Greece ==
Greece Gwlad Groeg
English name	Welsh name	Endonym	Notes
Aegean Sea	Môr Aegeaidd, Môr Egeaidd	Aigaio pelagos (Αιγαίο πέλαγος)	
Athens	Athen	Athína (Αθήνα)	
Cephalonia	Ceffalonia	Kefaloniá (Κεφαλονιά)	
Crete	Creta	Kríti (Κρήτη)	
Dodecanese	Y Deuddeng Ynys	Dodekánisa (Δωδεκάνησα)	
Rhodes	Rhodos	Ródos (Ρόδος)	
Thessaloniki	Thessaloníci	Thessaloníki (Θεσσαλονίκη)	

== Israel/Palestine ==
Israel Palestine Palesteina
English name	Welsh name	Endonym		Notes
English name	Welsh name	Name	Language	Notes
Galilee	Galilea	HaGalil (הגליל)	Hebrew	
Jerusalem	Jeriwsalem, Caersalem	Yerushalayim (ירושלים) / al-Quds (القُدس)	Hebrew/Arabic	

== Ireland ==
Ireland Iwerddon
English name	Welsh name	Endonym	Notes
Cork	Corc	Corcaigh	
Dublin	Dulyn	Baile Átha Cliath	Welsh name derives from the older Irish name Duibhlinn.
Derry	Dinas y Deri	Doire	
Ulster	Wlster; Wlaidd, Wledd, Wleth	Ulaidh	
Wexford	Llwch Garmon	Loch Garman	

== Italy ==
Italy Yr Eidal
English name	Welsh name	Endonym		Notes
English name	Welsh name	Name	Language	Notes
Florence	Fflorens	Firenze	Italian	
Rome	Rhufain	Roma	Italian	
Sicily	Sisili	Sicilia	Italian, Sicilian	
Tuscany	Twsgani, Tysgani	Toscana	Italian	
Venice	Fenis	Venesia	Venetian	
Venice	Fenis	Venezia	Italian	
Vatican City	Dinas y Fatican	Civitatis Vaticanae	Latin	
Vatican City	Dinas y Fatican	Città del Vaticano	Italian	

== Japan ==
Japan Siapan
English name	Welsh name	Endonym	Notes
Tokyo	Tocio	東京 (Tōkyō)	

== Netherlands ==
Netherlands Yr Iseldiroedd
English name	Welsh name	Endonym		Notes
English name	Welsh name	Name	Language	Notes
Frisia	Ffrisia	Fryslân	West Frisian	
Frisia	Ffrisia	Friesland	Dutch	
Limburg	Limbwrg	Limburg	Dutch	
Limburg	Limbwrg	Oas-Limburg	Limburgish	
North Brabant	Gogledd Brabant	Noord-Brabant	Dutch	
North Holland	Gogledd Holand	Noord-Holland	Dutch	
South Holland	De Holand	Zuid-Holland	Dutch	
Zeeland	Seland	Zeeland	Dutch	
Zeeland	Seland	Zeêland	Zeelandic	
Zeeland	Seland	Zêeland	West Flemish	
Zeelandic Flanders	Fflandrys Selandig	Zeeuws-Vlaanderen	Dutch	
Zeelandic Flanders	Fflandrys Selandig	Zeêuws-Vlaonderen	Zeelandic	
Zeelandic Flanders	Fflandrys Selandig	Zêeuws-Vloandern	West Flemish	

== Slovakia ==
Slovakia Slofacia
English name	Welsh name	Endonym		Notes
English name	Welsh name	Name	Language	Notes
Bratislava	Bratislafa	Bratislava	Slovak	

== South Africa ==
South Africa De Affrica
English name	Welsh name	Endonym		Notes
English name	Welsh name	Name	Language	Notes
Cape Town	Tref y Penrhyn	Kaapstad, iKapa	Afrikaans, Xhosa	
Cape of Good Hope	Penrhyn Gobaith Da	Kaap die Goeie Hoop	Afrikaans	

== Spain ==
Spain Sbaen
English name	Welsh name	Endonym		Notes
English name	Welsh name	Name	Language	Notes
Balearic Islands	Ynysoedd Balearaidd	Illes Balears, Islas Baleares	Catalan, Spanish	
Basque Country	Gwlad y Basg	Euskal Herria, País Vasco	Basque, Spanish	
Canary Islands	Yr Ynysoedd Dedwydd, Ynysoedd y Cŵn	Islas Canarias	Spanish	
Catalonia	Catalwnia	Catalunya, Cataluña	Catalan, Spanish	
Galicia	Galisia	Galicia; Galiza	Galician/Portuguese; Portuguese	
Valencian Community	Cymuned Falensia	Valencia, València	Spanish, Catalan	

== Turkey ==
Turkey Twrci
English name	Welsh name	Endonym	Notes
Constantinople	Caergystennin	قسطنطینیه (Ḳosṭanṭīnīye); Κωνσταντινούπολις (Kōnstantīnoúpolis); Constantinopolis	
Istanbul	Istanbwl	İstanbul	

== United Kingdom (excluding Wales) and Crown dependencies ==
United Kingdom Y Deyrnas Unedig
English name	Welsh name	Endonym		Notes
English name	Welsh name	Name	Language	Notes
Archenfield	Ergyng	Archenfield	English	
Ballingham	Llanbugnal	Ballingham	English	
Bath	Caerfaddon	Bath	English	
Belfast	Belffast	Béal Feirste	Irish	
Berwick-upon-Tweed	Caerferwig; Berwig	Berwick-upon-Tweed	English	
Birkenhead	Penbedw	Birkenhead	English	
Bishop's Castle	Trefesgob	Bishop's Castle	English	
Bridstow	Llansanffraid	Bridstow	English	
Bristol	Bryste; Caerodor	Bristol	English	
Cambridge	Caergrawnt	Cambridge	English	
Cambridgeshire	Swydd Gaergrawnt	Cambridgeshire	English	
Canterbury	Caergaint	Canterbury	English	
Carlisle	Caerliwelydd	Carlisle	English	
Catterick	Catraeth	Catterick	English	
Channel Islands	Ynysoedd y Sianel	Îles d'la Manche	Norman	
Cheshire	Swydd Gaer	Cheshire	English	
Chester	Caer(llion Fawr)	Chester	English	
Chichester	Caerfuddai	Chichester	English	
Chirbury	Llanffynhonwen	Chirbury	English	
Cirencester	Caer Ceri	Cirencester	English	
Clyde	Clud	Cluaidh	Scottish Gaelic	
Clyde	Clud	Clyde	English, Scots	
Colchester	Caercolyn	Colchester	English	
Cornwall	Cernyw	Kernow	Cornish	
Coventry	Cofentri, Cwyntry	Coventry	English	
Crewe	Cryw, Criw	Crewe	English	
Devon	Dyfnaint	Devon	English	
Doncaster	Dinas y Garrai; Caerdaun	Doncaster	English	
Dover	Dofr	Dover	English	
Dumfries	Caerferes	Dumfries	English	
Dumfries	Caerferes	Dùn Phris	Scottish Gaelic	
Durham	Dyrham; Caerweir	Durham	English	
East Midlands	Dwyrain Canolbarth Lloegr	East Midlands	English	
Edinburgh	Caeredin; Dinas Eidyn	Dùn Èideann	Scottish Gaelic	
Edinburgh	Caeredin; Dinas Eidyn	Edinburgh	English, Scots	
England	Lloegr	England	English	
English Channel	Môr Udd	English Channel	English	
English Channel	Môr Udd	La Manche	French	
English Channel	Môr Udd	Mor Bretannek	Cornish	
Exeter	Caerwysg	Exeter	English	
Falmouth	Aberfal	Aberfala	Cornish	
Firth of Forth	Moryd Gweryd, Aber Gweryd	Linne Foirthe	Scottish Gaelic	
Forest of Dean	Cantref Coch	Forest of Dean	English	
Foy	Llantiuoi	Foy	English	
River Forth	Afon Gweryd	Abhainn Dubh, Uisge For	Scottish Gaelic	
Glastonbury	Ynys Gwydrin, Ynys Wydrin	Glastonbury	English	
Gloucester	Caerloyw	Gloucester	English	
Gloucestershire	Swydd Gaerloyw	Gloucestershire	English	
Guernsey	Ynys y Garn	Guernèsi	Guernésiais	
Hebrides	Ynysoedd Heledd	Innse Gall	Scottish Gaelic	
Hentland	Henlland	Hentland	English	
Hereford	Henffordd	Hereford	English	
Herefordshire	Swydd Henffordd	Herefordshire	English	
Humber	Hwmbr	Humber	English	
Isle of Man	Ynys Manaw	Ellan Vannin	Manx	
Isle of Skye	Yr Ynys Hir	Eilean Sgitheanach	Scottish Gaelic	
Isle of Wight	Ynys Wyth	Isle of Wight	English	
Kenderchurch	Llancrug	Kenderchurch	English	
Kent	Caint	Kent	English	
Kentchurch	Llancein	Kentchurch	English	
Kilpeck	Llanddewi Cil Peddeg	Kilpeck	English	
Kington	Ceintun	Kington	English	
Lancashire	Swydd Gaerhirfryn	Lancashire	English	
Lancaster	Caerhirfryn	Lancaster	English	
Leicester	Caerlŷr	Leicester	English	
Leicestershire	Swydd Gaerlŷr	Leicestershire	English	
Leominster	Llanllieni	Leominster	English	
Lichfield	Caerlwytgoed	Lichfield	English	
Lincoln	Caerllyn, Llyncwlen	Lincoln	English	
Liverpool	Lerpwl, Llynlleifiad	Liverpool	English	
Loch Lomond	Llyn Llumonwy	Loch Laomainn	Scottish Gaelic	
London	Llundain, Caerludd	London	English	
Long Mynd	Cefn Hirfynydd	Long Mynd	English	
Ludlow	Llwydlo	Ludlow	English	
Lundy	Ynys Wair	Lundy	English	
Manchester	Manceinion	Manchester	English	
Greater Manchester	Manceinion Fwyaf	Manchester	English	
Marstow	Llanmartin	Marstow	English	
Mersey	Merswy	Mersey	English	
Merseyside	Glannau Merswy	Merseyside	English	
Michaelchurch	Llanmihangel	Michaelchurch	English	
Much Dewchurch	Llandewi	Much Dewchurch	English	
Much Wenlock	Gweunllwg	Much Wenlock	English	
Nantwich	Yr Heledd Wen	Nantwich	English	
Northwich	Yr Heledd Ddu	Northwich	English	
Nottingham	Y Tŷ Ogofog	Nottingham	English	
Orkney	Ynysoedd Erch	Arcaibh	Scottish Gaelic	
Oswestry	Croesoswallt	Oswestry	English	
Oxford	Rhydychen	Oxford	English	
Oxfordshire	Swydd Rydychen	Oxfordshire	English	
Pennines	Penwynion	Pennines	English	
Penrith	Penrhudd	Penrith	English	
Peterborough	Trebedr	Peterborough	English	
Plymouth	Aberplym	Plymouth	English	
Portsmouth	Llongborth	Portsmouth	English	
Preston	Trefoffeiriaid	Preston	English	
Ross-on-Wye	Rhosan-ar-Wy	Ross-on-Wye	English	
St Weonards	Llansangwenardd	St Weonards	English	
Salisbury	Caersallog; Caercaradog, Caergradwg	Salisbury	English	
Sark	Sarc	Cerq, Sèr	French	
Scotland	Yr Alban	Alba	Scottish Gaelic	
Scotland	Yr Alban	Scotland	English, Scots	
Sellack	Llansulac	Sellack	English	
Somerset	Gwlad-yr-haf	Somerset	English	
Shrewsbury	Amwythig	Shrewsbury	English	
Shropshire	Swydd Amwythig	Shropshire	English	
St Albans	Caermincip	St Albans	English	
The Stiperstones	Carneddau Teon	The Stiperstones	English	
Stonehenge	Côr y Cewri	Stonehenge	English	
Strathclyde	Ystrad Clud	Srath Chluaidh	Scottish Gaelic	
Thames	Tafwys	Thames	English	
Tidenham	Ystrad Hafren	Tidenham	English	
Trent	Trannon	Trent	English	
Ulster	Wlster; Wlaidd, Wledd, Wleth	Ulaidh	Irish	
Warwick	Warwig	Warwick	English	
Warwickshire	Swydd Warwig	Warwickshire	English	
Welsh Bicknor	Llangystennin Garth Brenni	Welsh Bicknor	English	
West Midlands	Gorllewin Canolbarth Lloegr	West Midlands	English	
Whitchurch	Yr Eglwys Wen	Whitchurch	English	
Winchester	Caerwynt, Caerguint	Winchester	English	
Wirral	Cilgwri	Wirral	English	
Worcester	Caerwrangon	Worcester	English	
Worcestershire	Swydd Gaerwrangon	Worcestershire	English	
The Wrekin	Din Gwrygon	The Wrekin	English	
Wroxeter	Caerwrygion	Wroxeter	English	
York	Efrog, Caerefrog	York	English	
Yorkshire	Swydd Efrog	Yorkshire	English	

== United States ==
United States Unol Daleithiau
English name	Welsh name	Endonym	Notes
California	Califfornia	California	
New Mexico	Mecsico Newydd	New Mexico; Nueva México	
New York City	Dinas Efrog Newydd	New York City	
Pennsylvania	Pensylfania	Pennsylvania	
Texas	Tecsas	Texas; Tejas	

== Sources ==
- Collins-Longman, Yr Atlas Cymraeg Newydd, ISBN 1-86085-377-3 (1999)
- Book of Llandaff
- Welsh Academy English–Welsh Dictionary

== See also ==
- List of European exonyms
- List of European regions with alternative names
- List of European rivers with alternative names
- Names of European cities in different languages
- Welsh placenames
- Welsh place names in other countries
