= List of locations in Australia with an English name =

This article lists places in Australia that were given names of places in England by English emigrants and explorers. It also includes place names where there is a similar place name in England, even if one is not directly derived from the other. For example, Oxley is a place name in England, but Oxley, Queensland is named for the explorer John Oxley rather than the English place. Similarly, Kenilworth is a place name in England, but Kenilworth, Queensland is reportedly named after a novel of that name. In some cases the place name in England is that of a residence or farm; for example, Hughenden, Queensland is derived from Hughenden Manor in Buckinghamshire.

== New South Wales ==
- Barham
- Barnes
- Barnsley
- Belford
- Berkeley
- Bexhill
- Blackheath
- Blackwall
- Bookham
- Branxton
- Brocklesby
- Caldwell
- Camberwell
- Camden Park
- Chipping Norton
- Clarendon
- Clifton
- Coledale
- Croydon
- Dalton
- Darlington
- Epping
- Euston
- Exeter
- Frampton
- Gloucester
- Gosford
- Grafton
- Greenwich
- Hanwood
- Harefield
- Ilford
- Kendall
- Kensington
- Liverpool
- Manchester Square
- Milton
- Morpeth
- Newcastle
- New England
- Osborne
- Otford
- Oxley
- Paddington
- Penrith
- Penrose
- Richmond
- Rosedale
- Stanmore
- Stroud
- Sydenham
- Sydney
- Tamworth
- Toronto
- Tottenham
- Wellington
- Windsor
- Woolwich

== Queensland ==
- Albion
- Alderley
- Amberley
- Ascot
- Beaudesert
- Blackwall
- Brighton
- Chelmer
- Croydon
- Dalby
- Dunwich
- Edmonton
- Gatton
- Grantham
- Highgate Hill
- Holland Park
- Hughenden
- Hyde Park
- Ipswich
- Isisford
- Kenilworth
- Kensington
- Margate
- Milton
- Newmarket
- Northumberland Islands
- Oxley
- Paddington
- Parkwood
- Pimlico
- Redcliffe
- Redlynch
- Richmond
- Rockhampton
- Rothwell
- Runcorn
- Sandgate
- Scarborough
- Sherwood
- Shorncliffe
- Southport
- St George
- Stratford
- Torquay
- Warwick
- Westwood
- Windsor
- Winton

== South Australia ==
- Brighton
- Brinkworth
- Burton
- Clarendon
- Clayton
- Copley
- Darlington
- Dutton
- Glossop
- Harrogate
- Hammond
- Hyde Park
- Littlehampton
- Loxton
- Lyndhurst
- Malvern
- Mount Pleasant
- Peterborough
- Redhill
- Saddleworth
- Salisbury
- Spalding
- Stockport
- Stockwell
- Wellington
- Woodside

== Tasmania ==
- Beaconsfield
- Bellingham
- Bishopsbourne
- Blackwall
- Bridgenorth
- Brighton
- Cranbrook
- Deddington
- Devonport
- Exeter
- Falmouth
- Harford
- Kempton
- Kettering
- Launceston
- New Norfolk
- Orford
- Parkham
- Richmond
- Sheffield
- Sidmouth
- Somerset
- Westbury
- Wiltshire
- Wivenhoe
- Melton Mowbray

== Victoria ==
- Addington
- Ascot near Ballarat
- Ascot near Bendigo
- Beaconsfield
- Berwick
- Blackburn
- Brighton
- Burnley
- Charlton
- Chelsea
- Cheltenham
- Clayton
- Croydon
- Dartmoor
- Dartmouth
- Doncaster
- Epping
- Everton
- Exford
- Harrow
- Hastings
- Heywood
- Horsham
- Inglewood
- London Bridge
- Macclesfield
- Malmsbury
- Malvern
- Melbourne
- Merton
- Newham
- Oxley
- Peterborough
- Preston
- Ringwood
- Richmond
- Red Hill
- Rochester
- Rosedale
- Stratford
- Torquay
- Woodside

== Western Australia ==
- Beaconsfield
- Bunbury
- Boddington
- Brighton
- Carlisle
- Caversham
- Darlington
- Denham
- Derby
- Exmouth
- Highbury
- High Wycombe
- Inglewood
- Northampton
- Parkwood
- Redcliffe
- Scarborough
- Spalding
- Warwick

== See also ==
- English Australians
- List of place names of Dutch origin in Australia
- Locations in Australia with a Scottish name
- Locations in Australia with a Welsh name
