= Los Altares Valley =

Argentine valley

Coordinates: 43.892°S 68.392°W

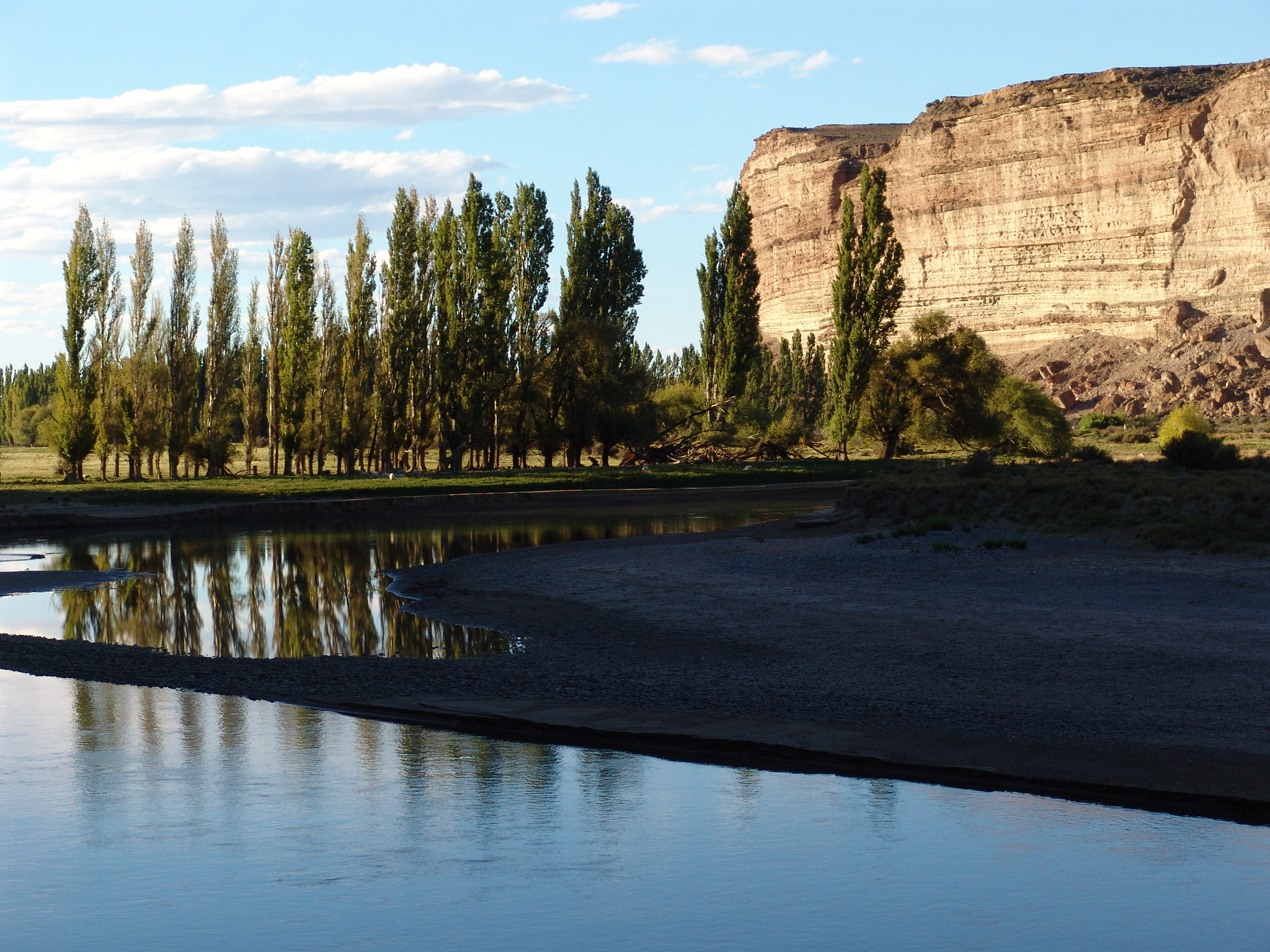
Los Altares Valley

Los Altares Valley (Valle de los Altares) (Welsh: Dyffryn yr Allorau), also called Las Ruinas Valley (Valle de las Ruinas) is a valley in central Chubut Province in southern Argentina. It is accessed via National Route 25.

Los Altares Valley is crossed by the middle Chubut River, located 200 kilometres (120 mi) west of Rawson and 150 kilometres (93 mi) east of Tecka. The valley landscape is desert and semi-desert, filled with landforms and mountains with layered strata of different colors that are almost completely bare of vegetation. The valley continues to the east as Valle de los Mártires and to the west as Valle Paso de Indios. The valley is home to ancient rock paintings by indigenous peoples. This area has been proposed to form part of a national park.
