= Los Altares =

- Rural commune
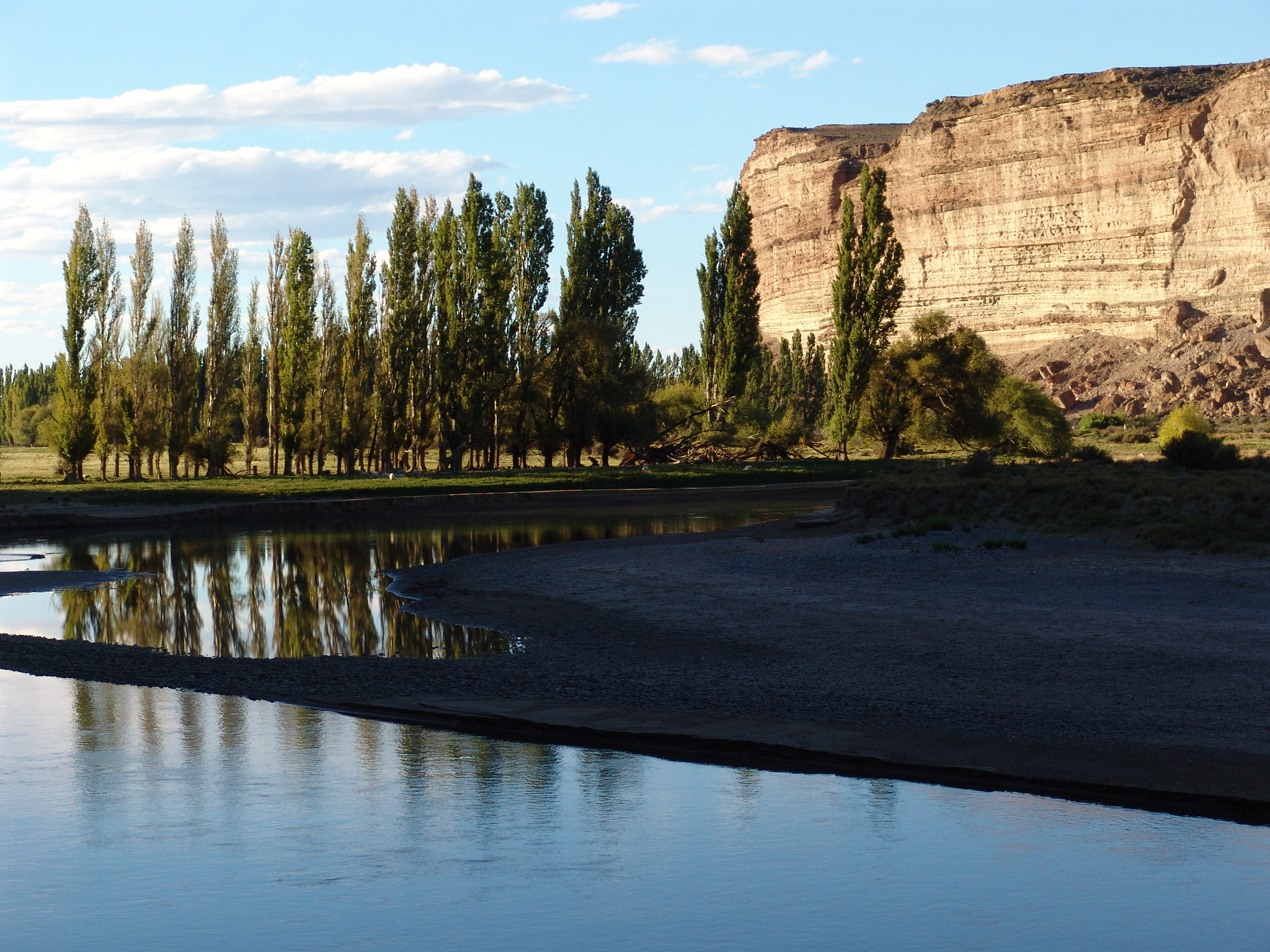
- Los Altares Valley

- Location within Argentina
- Coordinates: 43.892°S 68.392°W
- Country: Argentina
- Province: Chubut
- Department: Paso de Indios
- Founded: February 18, 1960

Government
  - Presidente Junta Vecinal: Mario Oviedo

Population (2001)
  - Total: 123
- Demonym: Altarense
- Time zone: UTC−3 (ART)
- Postal code: U9127
- Area code: 0297
- Climate: BWk

Los Altares is a rural commune in Paso de Indios Department, Chubut Province in southern Argentina. As of 2001, it had 123 inhabitants. Mario Oviedo is the municipality's leader, with the title Presidente Junta Vecinal.

The rural commune of Los Altares is located in Los Altares Valley, near the center of Chubut Province in a semi-arid region 230 kilometres (140 mi) from Trelew and 323 kilometres (201 mi) from Esquel along National Route 25. Los Altares takes its name from the surrounding rock formations. There are 80 kilometres (50 mi) of rock walls up to 70 metres (230 ft) tall in the nearby valley, giving the appearance of altars. This terrain is typical of the Patagonian Steppe in central Argentina.

Near the settlement, there is a site of ancient Tehuelche rock art from the tenth century. The site is today under the guardianship of the Provincial Cultural Authority. There is one painting of 90x53 centimeters composed of mineral pigments mixed with organic material.

The descendants of the native Tehuelches living in the area are artisans. They will craft arrowheads at visitors' request.

== Climate ==
Climate data for Los Altares, Chubut (1993–2013)
Month	Jan	Feb	Mar	Apr	May	Jun	Jul	Aug	Sep	Oct	Nov	Dec	Year
Record high °C (°F)	39.8 (103.6)	41.0 (105.8)	39.0 (102.2)	32.6 (90.7)	26.2 (79.2)	21.8 (71.2)	23.0 (73.4)	25.0 (77.0)	29.0 (84.2)	34.0 (93.2)	38.4 (101.1)	42.0 (107.6)	42.0 (107.6)
Mean maximum °C (°F)	37.0 (98.6)	37.0 (98.6)	33.6 (92.5)	28.6 (83.5)	22.8 (73.0)	18.7 (65.7)	18.2 (64.8)	20.8 (69.4)	24.7 (76.5)	29.7 (85.5)	33.4 (92.1)	36.5 (97.7)	39.0 (102.2)
Daily mean °C (°F)	21.9 (71.4)	20.7 (69.3)	17.4 (63.3)	12.8 (55.0)	8.4 (47.1)	5.3 (41.5)	4.6 (40.3)	7.0 (44.6)	10.5 (50.9)	14.5 (58.1)	17.8 (64.0)	20.8 (69.4)	13.5 (56.3)
Mean minimum °C (°F)	6.9 (44.4)	7.1 (44.8)	2.6 (36.7)	−1.1 (30.0)	−5.5 (22.1)	−8.2 (17.2)	−9.1 (15.6)	−5.8 (21.6)	−2.6 (27.3)	1.1 (34.0)	4.0 (39.2)	5.8 (42.4)	−10.4 (13.3)
Record low °C (°F)	2.8 (37.0)	2.0 (35.6)	1.0 (33.8)	−4.8 (23.4)	−11.0 (12.2)	−17.0 (1.4)	−20.0 (−4.0)	−11.6 (11.1)	−5.2 (22.6)	−2.6 (27.3)	−2.4 (27.7)	1.2 (34.2)	−20.0 (−4.0)
Average precipitation mm (inches)	6.1 (0.24)	11.5 (0.45)	12.5 (0.49)	16.2 (0.64)	27.5 (1.08)	20.6 (0.81)	14.4 (0.57)	16.6 (0.65)	15.6 (0.61)	15.9 (0.63)	4.8 (0.19)	5.9 (0.23)	167.6 (6.60)
Source: Ministerio del Interior, Obras Públicas y Vivienda
