= Locations in Australia with a Scottish name =

This is a list of placenames in Scotland which have subsequently been applied to parts of Australia by Scottish emigrants or explorers.

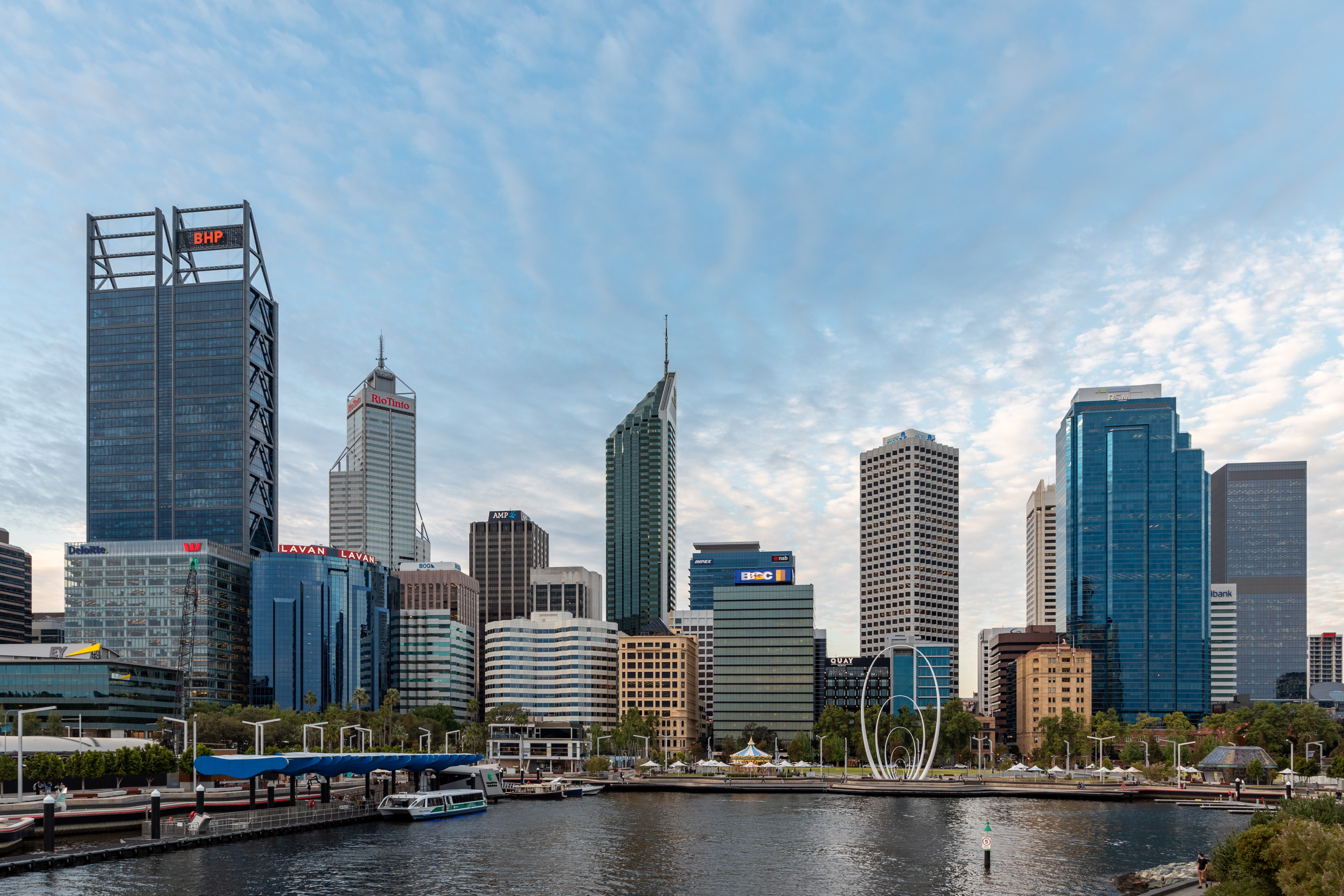
The Perth skyline viewed from Elizabeth Quay

== Australian Capital Territory ==
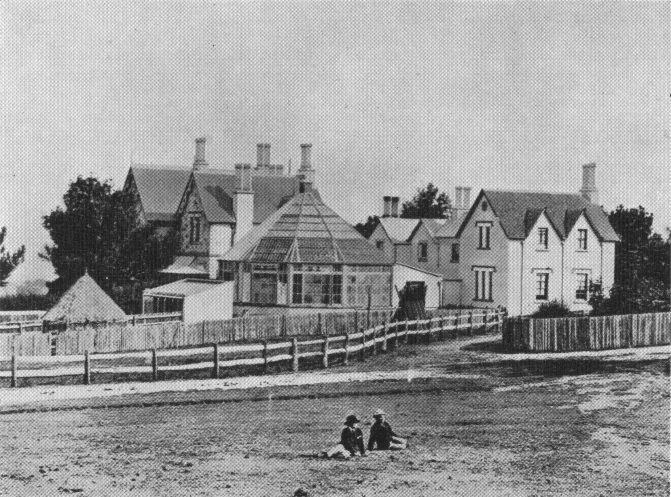
Duntroon house in 1870

- Campbell (Robert Campbell)
- Duntroon
- Fraser
- Lawson
- Macgregor
- Macquarie (Lachlan Macquarie)
- Moncrieff
- Stirling

== New South Wales ==
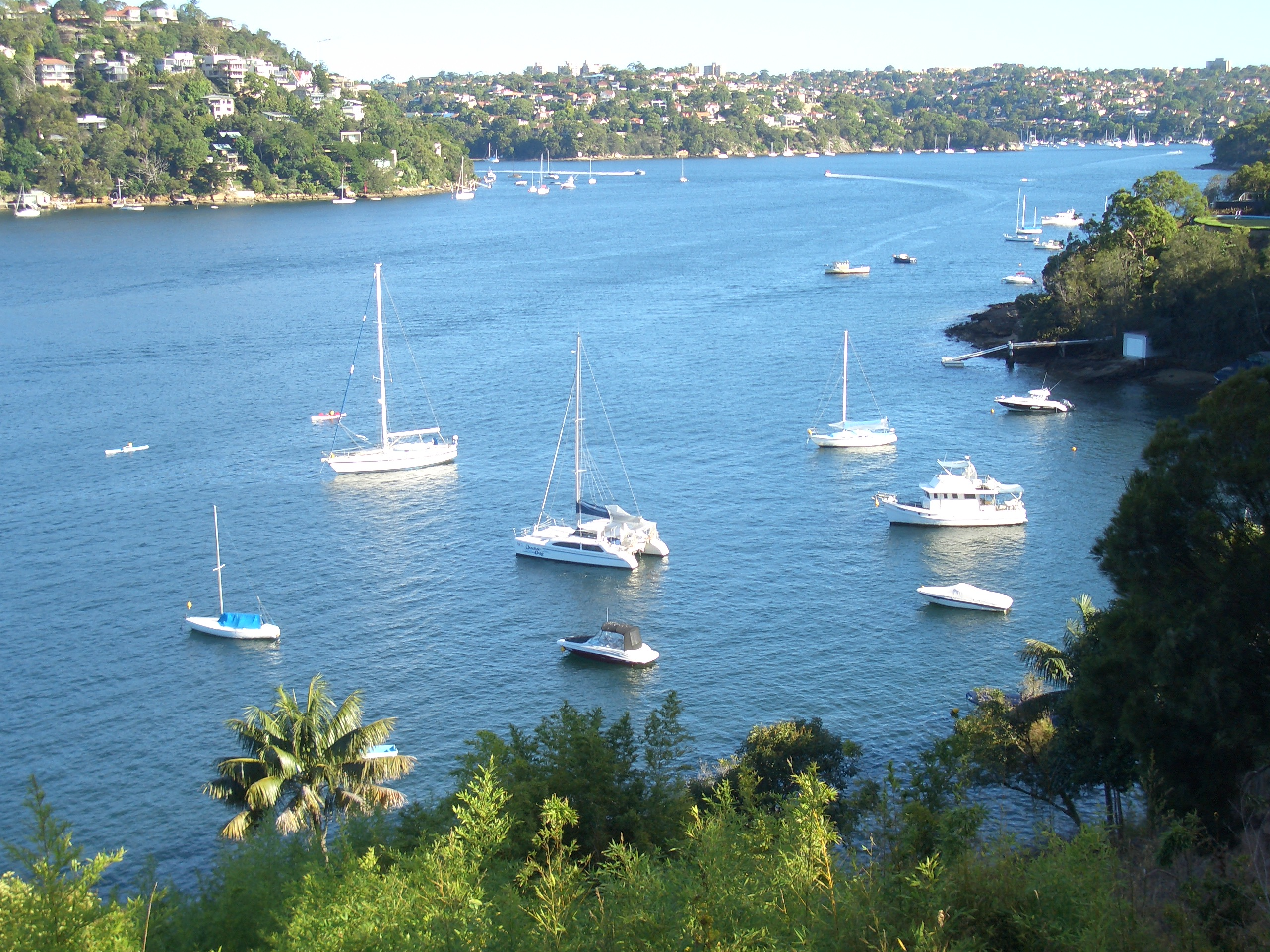
Sydney Harbour from Castlecrag

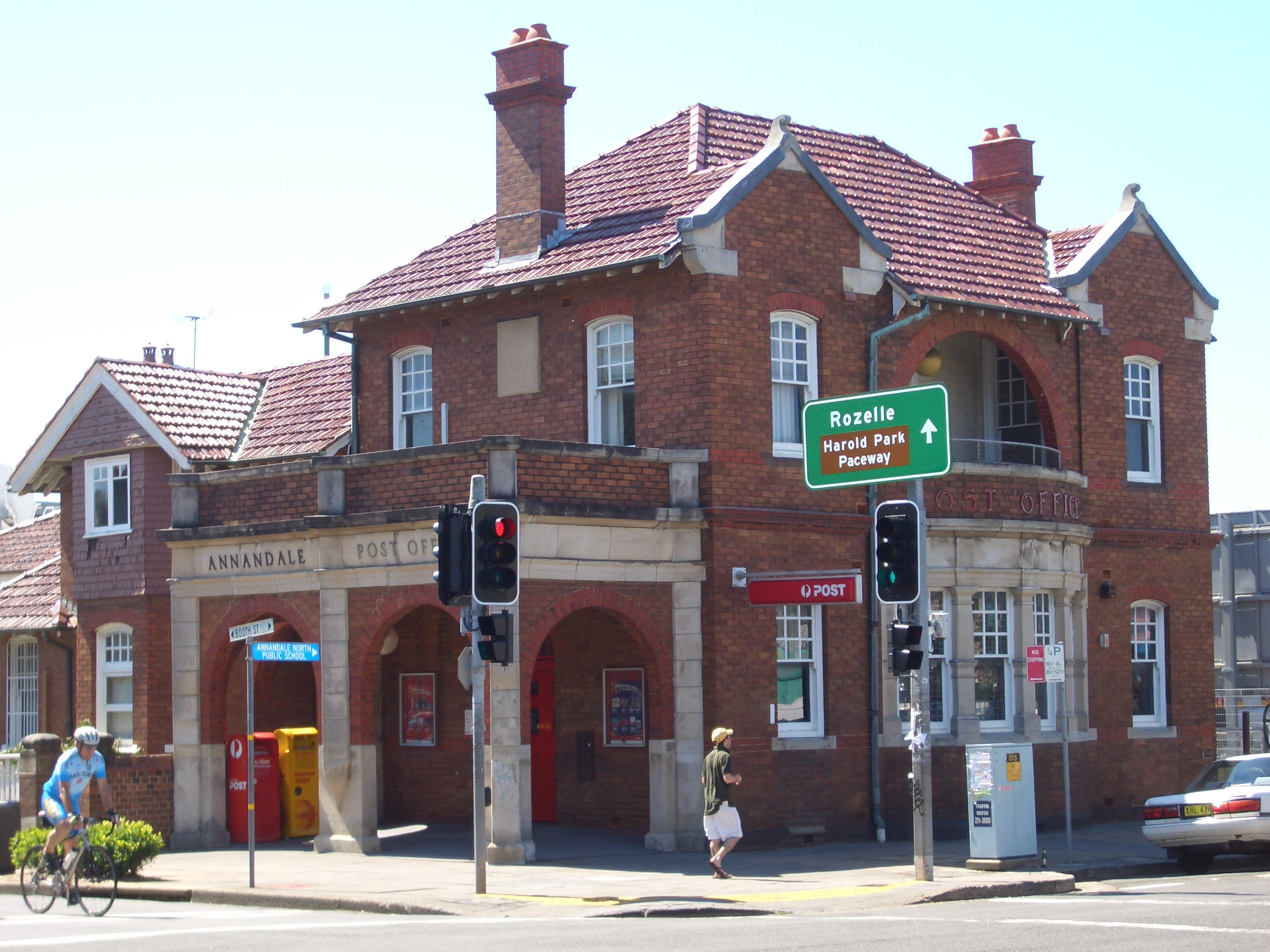
Annandale Post Office, an example of the Federation Queen Anne style, is on the Register of the National Estate.

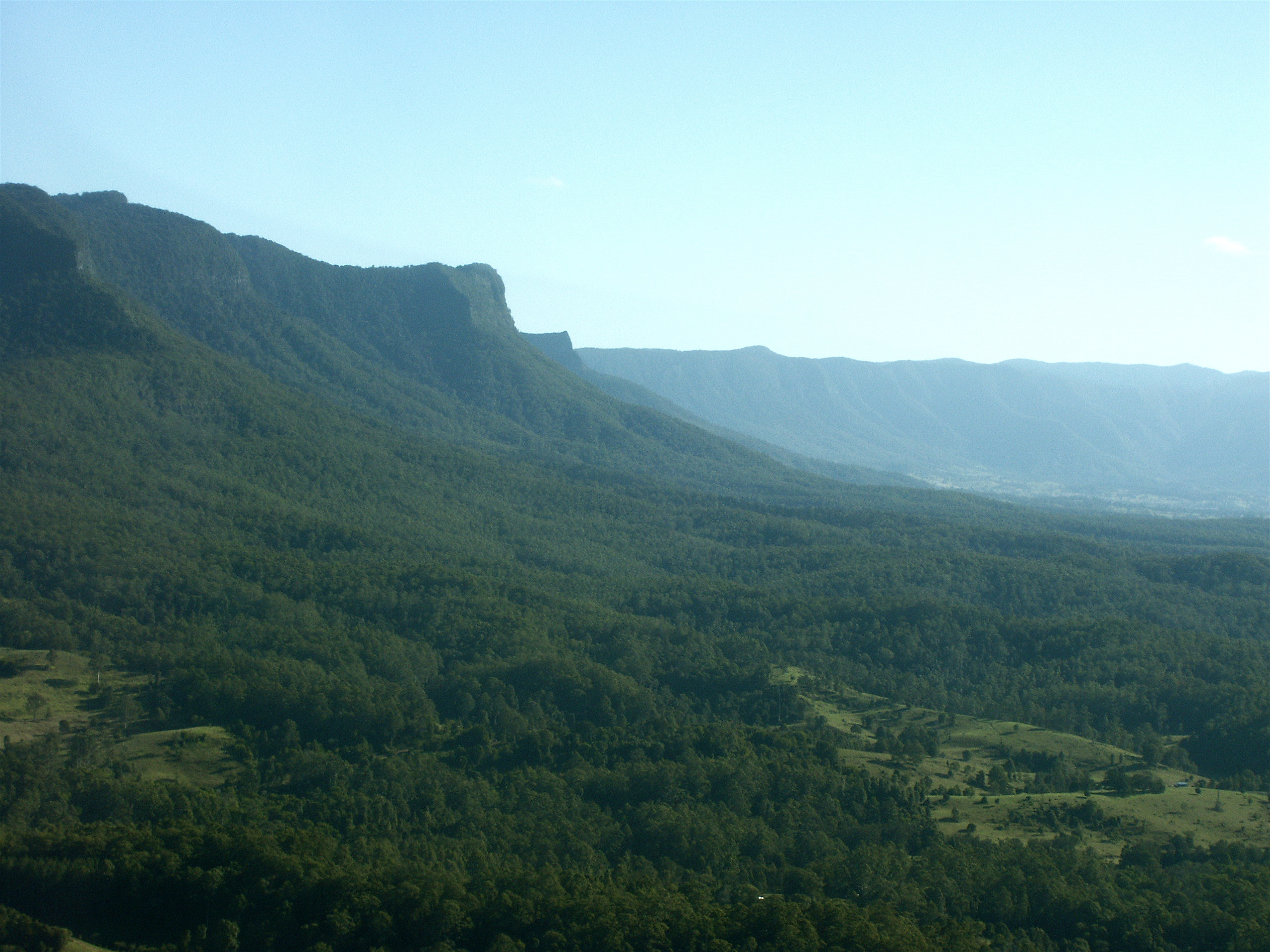
Upper Tweed Valley showing the caldera wall

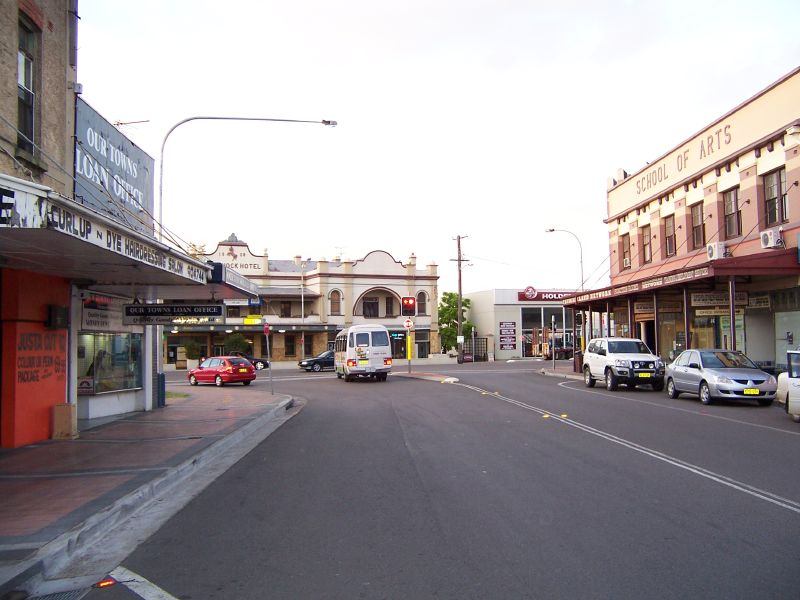
Cessnock

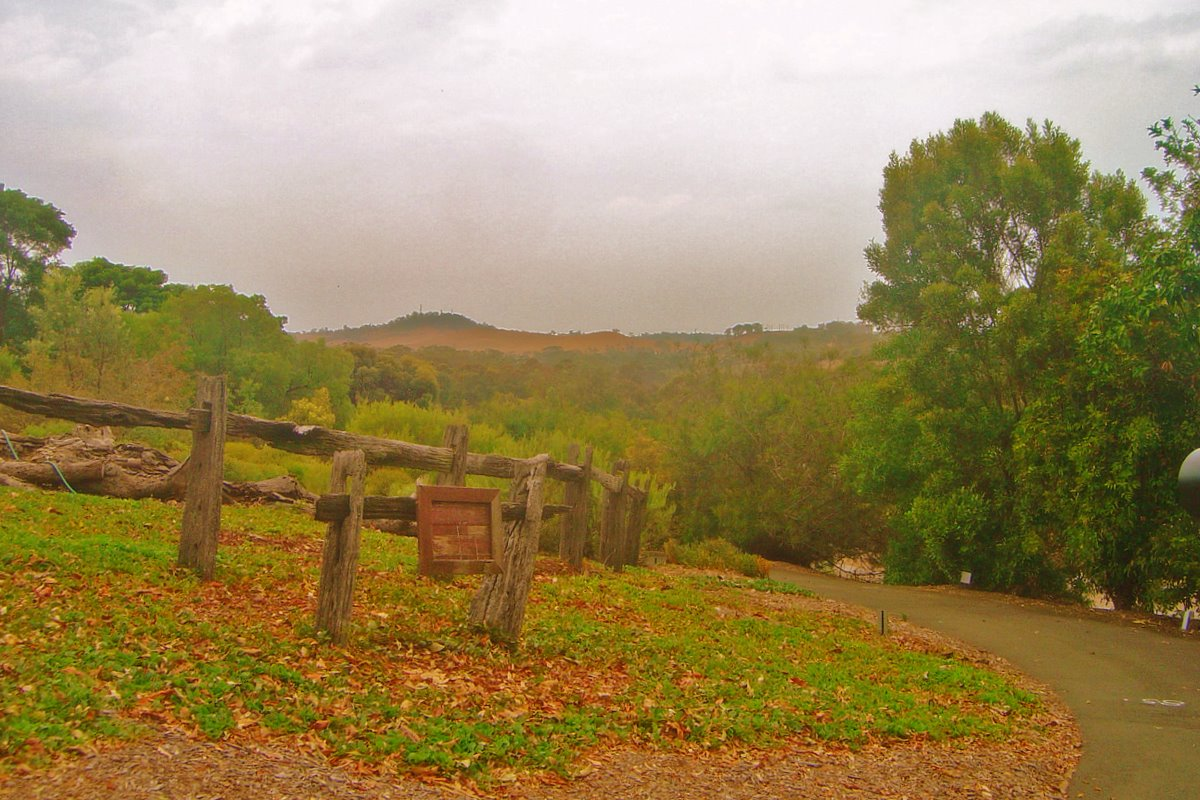
Australian Botanic Garden Mount Annan

- Aberdeen
- Abermain
- Abernethy
- Appin
- Armidale (Armadale), suburbs include Ben Venue
- Balranald
- Ben Lomond
- Breadalbane
- Buchanan
- Campbelltown
- Campsie
- Carabost
- Cessnock
- Dalgety
- Dundee
- Duns Creek
- Fingal Bay (Fingal, Scottish form of Finn MacCool)
- Fingal Head
- Galston
- Glencoe
- Glendale
- Glen Innes and Glen Innes Severn Council
- Glenmore (now called Elsmore)
- Hamilton
- Inverell and Inverell Shire
- Invergowrie
- Largs
- Lismore
- Lithgow
- Lochinvar
- Lorn
- Maclean
- Maitland
- Mossgiel
- Mount Imlay
- Lake Macquarie
  - City of Lake Macquarie
  - Balmoral, New South Wales
  - Macquarie Hills
- Paterson (William Paterson (explorer))
- Pitnacree
- Scone
- Scotland Island

Flag of Scotland Island

- Stuart Town
- Sutherland
  - Sutherland Point
  - Sutherland Shire
- Tweed River
  - Tweed Heads
  - Tweed Shire
  - Tweed Valley
  - Tweed Volcano
- Suburbs of Sydney
  - Abbotford
  - Alfords Point
  - Airds
  - Annandale (Annandale)
  - Annangrove
  - Balmain and Balmain East
  - Balmoral
  - Blair Athol
  - Blairmount
  - Bonnyrigg and Bonnyrigg Heights
  - Busby
  - Campbelltown
  - Camperdown
  - Castlecrag (by architect Walter Burley Griffin, who named the suburb after a towering crag of rock overlooking Middle Harbour, known locally as Edinburgh Castle)
  - Cawdor
  - Clyde
  - Cowan
  - Davidson, suburb in the Northern Beaches area of Sydney and Electoral district of Davidson, a seat in the New South Wales Legislative Assembly
  - Doonside
  - Dundas and Dundas Valley
  - Elderslie
  - Erskineville
  - Glenmore Park
  - Glenorie
  - Macdonaldtown
  - Macquarie Fields
  - Macquarie Links
  - Macquarie Park
  - Melrose Park
  - Minto and Minto Heights
  - Mount Annan
  - Seaforth (Loch Seaforth, Isle of Lewis)
  - Smeaton Grange
  - Zetland

== Northern Territory ==
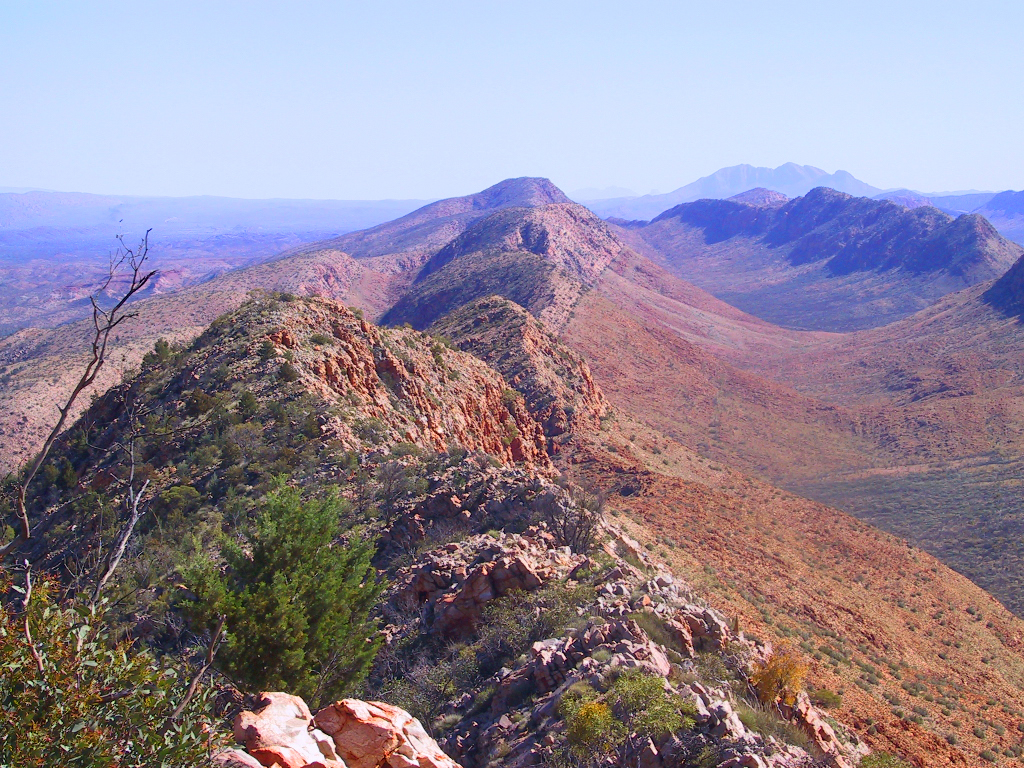
View along the West MacDonnell Ranges from the Larapinta Trail, near Glen Helen

- Cape Crawford
- Douglas / Daly Esplanade Conservation Area
- Douglas Hot Springs (Tjuwaliyn) Nature Park
- Glen Helen
- Kintore
- Kintore Caves Nature Park
- MacDonnell Ranges
- Lake Mackay
- Point Stuart Coastal Reserve
- Stuart Highway
- Tennant Creek

== Queensland ==
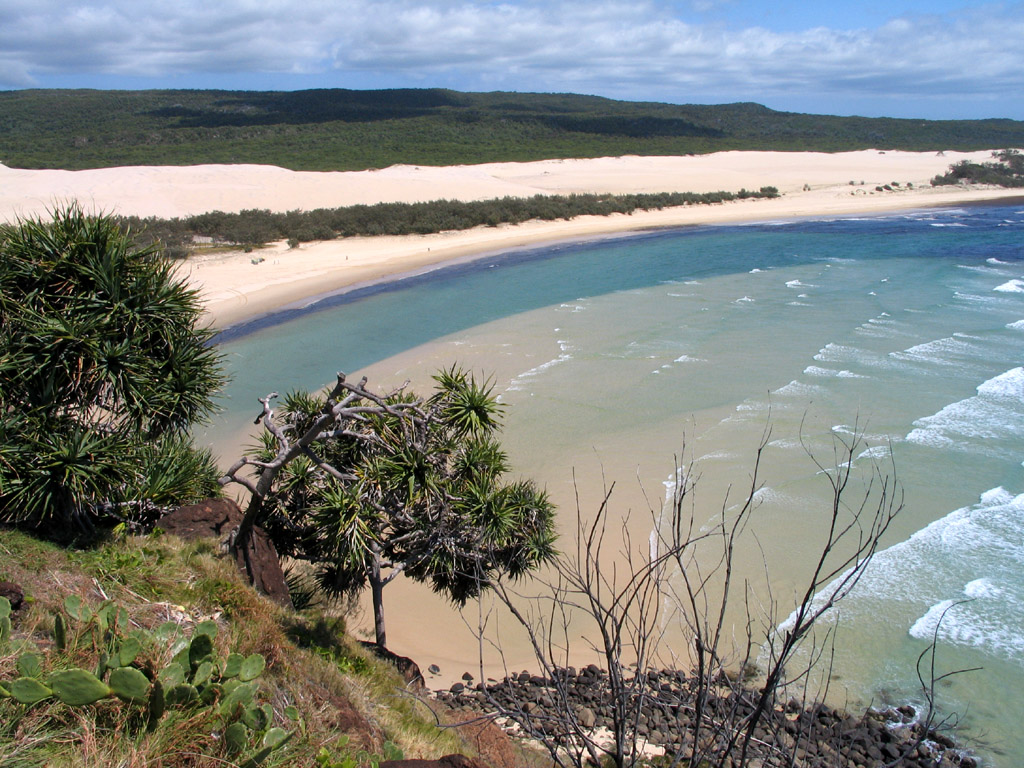
View from Indian Head, Fraser Island, Queensland, Australia

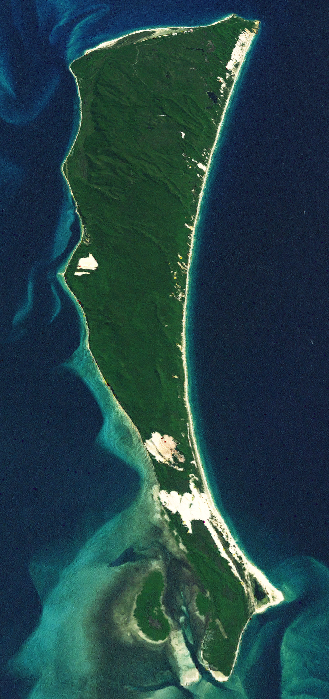
Moreton Island

- Abbotsford
- Abercorn
- Abergowrie
- Airdmillan
- Airlie Beach
- Albany Creek
- Alloway
- Alva, via Ayr
- Aramac (R. R. Mackenzie)
- Argyll
- Armstrong Beach
- Athol
- Ayr
- Balgowan
- Ballandean
- Ballogie
- Balmoral Ridge
- Balnagowan
- Bannockburn
- Barcaldine
- Barlyne
- Birnam (Scenic Rim Region)
- Birnam (Toowoomba Region)
- Blairmore
- Bogie
- Bon Accord, Queensland (Bon Accord, slogan of Aberdeen)
- Braemore, Queensland
- Breadalbane, Queensland
- Brisbane (Thomas Brisbane)
  - Auchenflower
  - Balmoral
  - Hamilton
  - Kelvin Grove (Kelvingrove Park)
  - Kenmore and Kenmore Hills
  - MacGregor (William MacGregor)
  - Mackenzie
  - Robertson
- Burnside
- Cairns (of Irish origin)
  - Bellenden Ker
  - Buchan Point
  - Glen Boughton
  - Gordonvale
  - Macalister Range
- Campbell Creek
- Campbells Pocket
- Charlestown
- Clinton
- Closeburn
- Colinton
- Conondale
- Cowan Cowan
- Craiglie
- Craigslea, now part of Chermside
- Cromarty
- Crossdale
- Dalbeg (Dail Beag)
- Shire of Dalrymple
- Dalrymple Heights
- Shire of Dalrymple (former)
- Deuchar
- Shire of Douglas
- Dundas
- Dysart
- Esk and Esk Island
- Fraser Island (Eliza Fraser)
- Glen Allyn
- Glenbar
- Glencoe
- Glendale
- Glenella
- Glen Isla
- Glenroy
- Glenwood
- Gordonstone
- Gowrie Junction
- Gowrie Mountain
- Grahams Creek
- Haigslea (Douglas Haig)
- Hamilton Island
- Hazeldean
- Irvinebank
- Jardine Islet
- Kennedy
- Kilbirnie
- Kilcoy
- Kilkivan
- Lamington
- Lammermoor
- Landsborough (William Landsborough)
- Logan City
- McEwens Beach
- Mackay (See John Mackay (Australian Pioneer))
  - Mackay Region
  - Mackay Harbour
  - North Mackay
  - Mackay City
  - West Mackay
  - South Mackay
  - East Mackay
  - North Mackay
- Maclagan
- Maleny
- Mitchell (Thomas Mitchell (explorer))
- Molendinar (Molendinar Burn in Glasgow)
- Morayfield
- Moreton Bay, City of Moreton Bay and Moreton Island (James Douglas, 14th Earl of Morton)
- Mount Dalrymple
- Murray Upper
- New Beith
- North Maclean
- Ormiston
- Pentland
- Port Douglas
- Ross River, principal river of Townsville
- Scotchy Pocket
- Sinclair Island
- Strathpine (Strath + pine)
- Tully
- Westmar

== South Australia ==
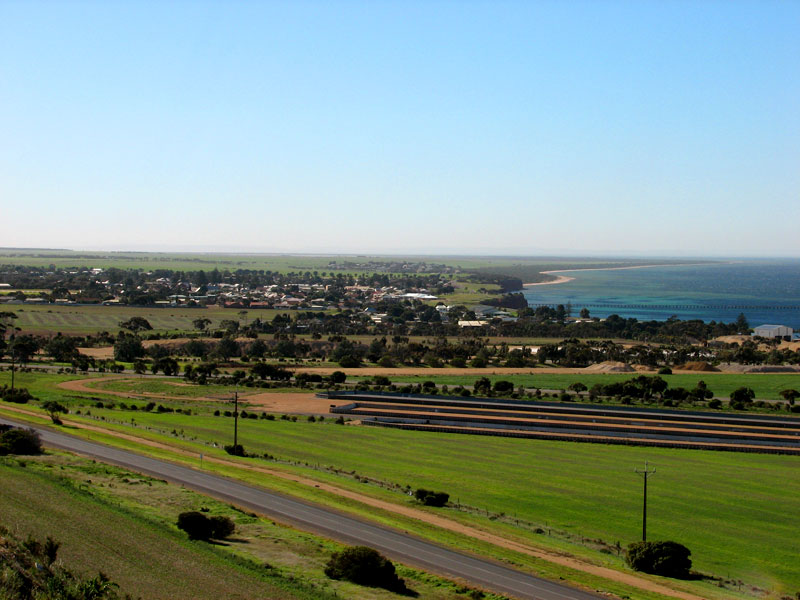
Ardrossan, SA

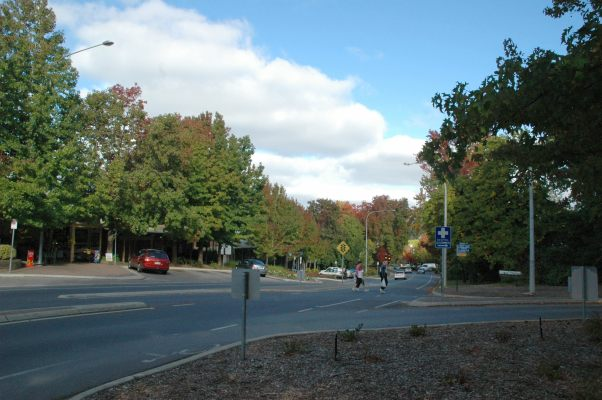
Stirling main street.

- Ardrossan
- Balgowan
- Bute
- Cockburn
- Edinburgh
- Hamilton
- Jamestown (James Fergusson)
- Keith
- Lochiel
- Maitland
- McLaren Vale
- Melrose
- Port Pirie
- Stenhouse Bay
- Stirling
- Strathalbyn
- Talisker Conservation Park (Talisker, Skye)
- Adelaide Suburbs
  - Aberfoyle Park
  - Athol Park,
  - Blair Athol
  - Burnside (named 1839 by Peter Anderson, a Scots migrant)
  - Campbelltown
  - Craigmore
  - Edinburgh (RAAF Base Edinburgh)
  - Glenalta
  - Glenelg, Glenelg North and Glenelg South
  - Glengowrie
  - Glen Osmond
  - Glenside
  - Largs Bay and Largs North
  - McLaren Flat and McLaren Vale
  - Skye
  - St Kilda

Lobethal was known as Tweedvale for a number of years, due to the World Wars.

== Tasmania ==
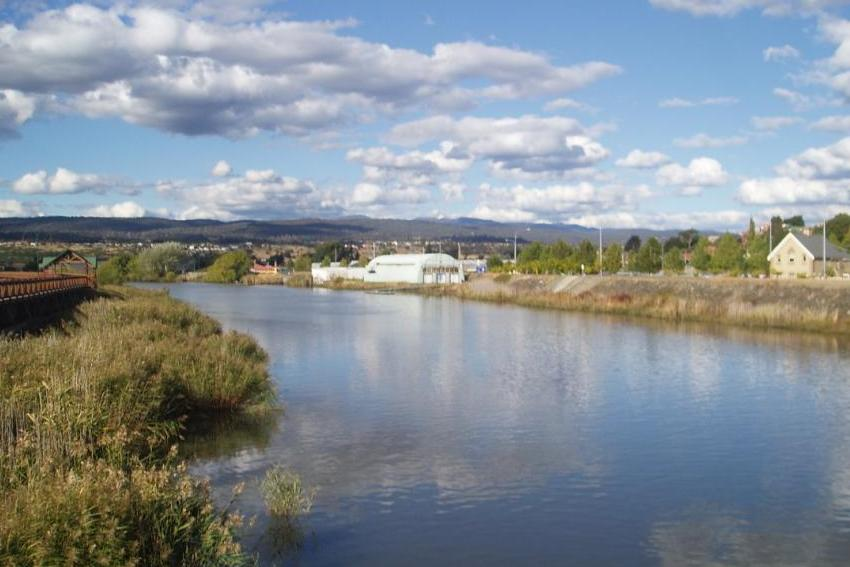
North Esk River from a bridge in Launceston

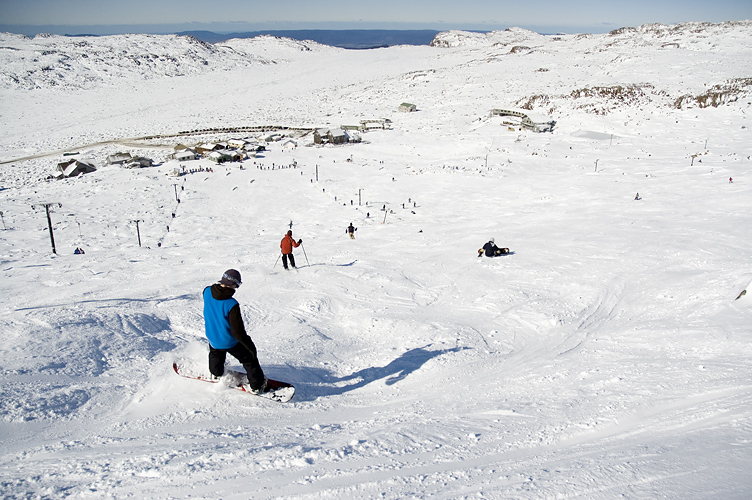
Summit of Ben Lomond

- Aberdeen
- Ben Lomond
- Breadalbane
- Calder
- Campbell Town
- Currie
- Douglas River
- Dysart
- Elderslie
- Fingal
- Forth
- Glen Dhu (Glen Dhu = Gleann Dubh - black glen)
- Glengarry
- Gordon
- Gowrie Park
- Gretna
- Invermay
- Killiekrankie
- Lachlan
- Leith
- Macquarie and Macquarie Plains
- Macquarie Island
- Melrose
- Mount Murchison (Tasmania)
- Patersonia, an old name for Launceston.
- Perth
- Port Dalrymple (Dalrymple), the old name for George Town.
- Strathblane
- Upper Esk, North Esk River and South Esk River
- Suburbs of Hobart-Glenorchy-
  - Firthside ("Firth")
  - Glenorchy & City of Glenorchy
  - Granton
  - Howden
  - Lauderdale
  - Montrose

== Victoria ==
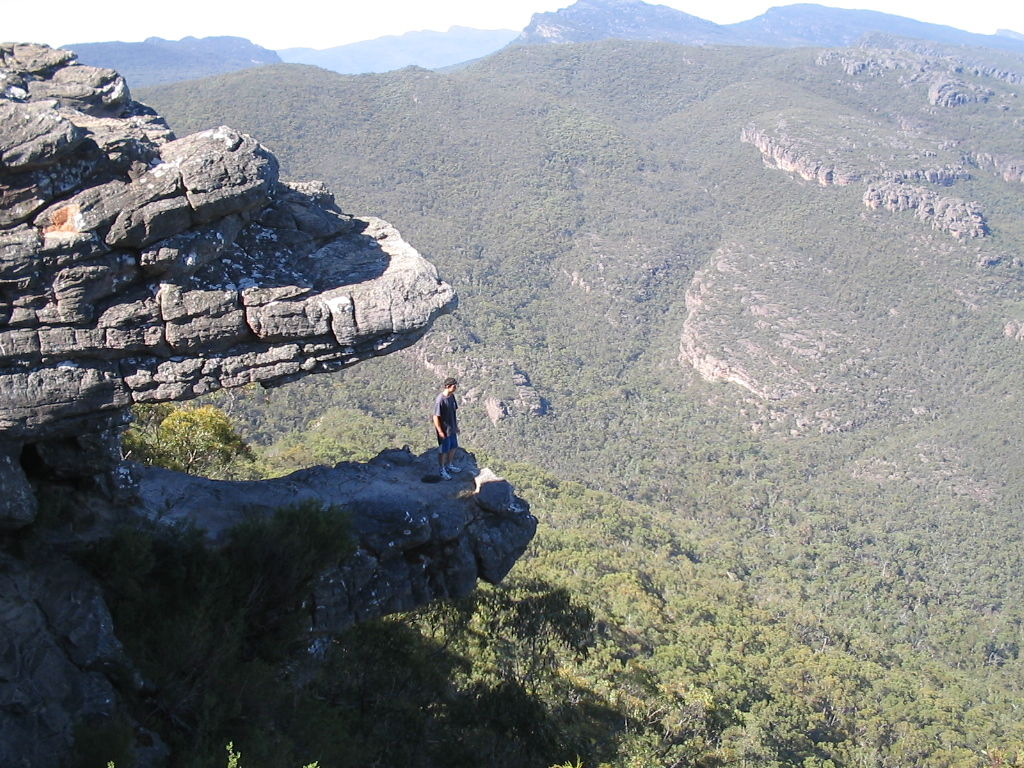
The Balconies (formerly known as the 'Jaws of Death') - Grampians National Park, Victoria, Australia

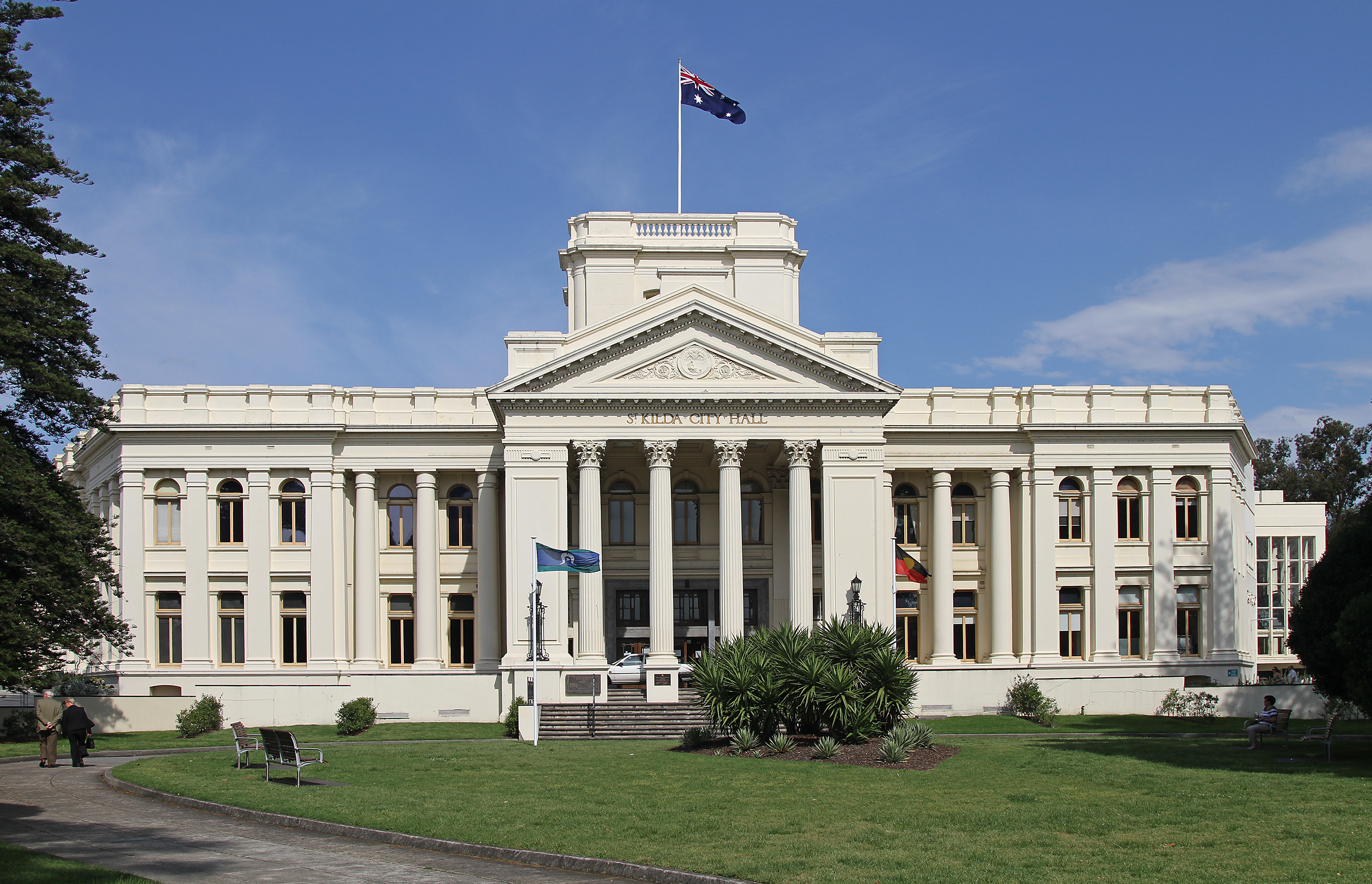
St Kilda town hall

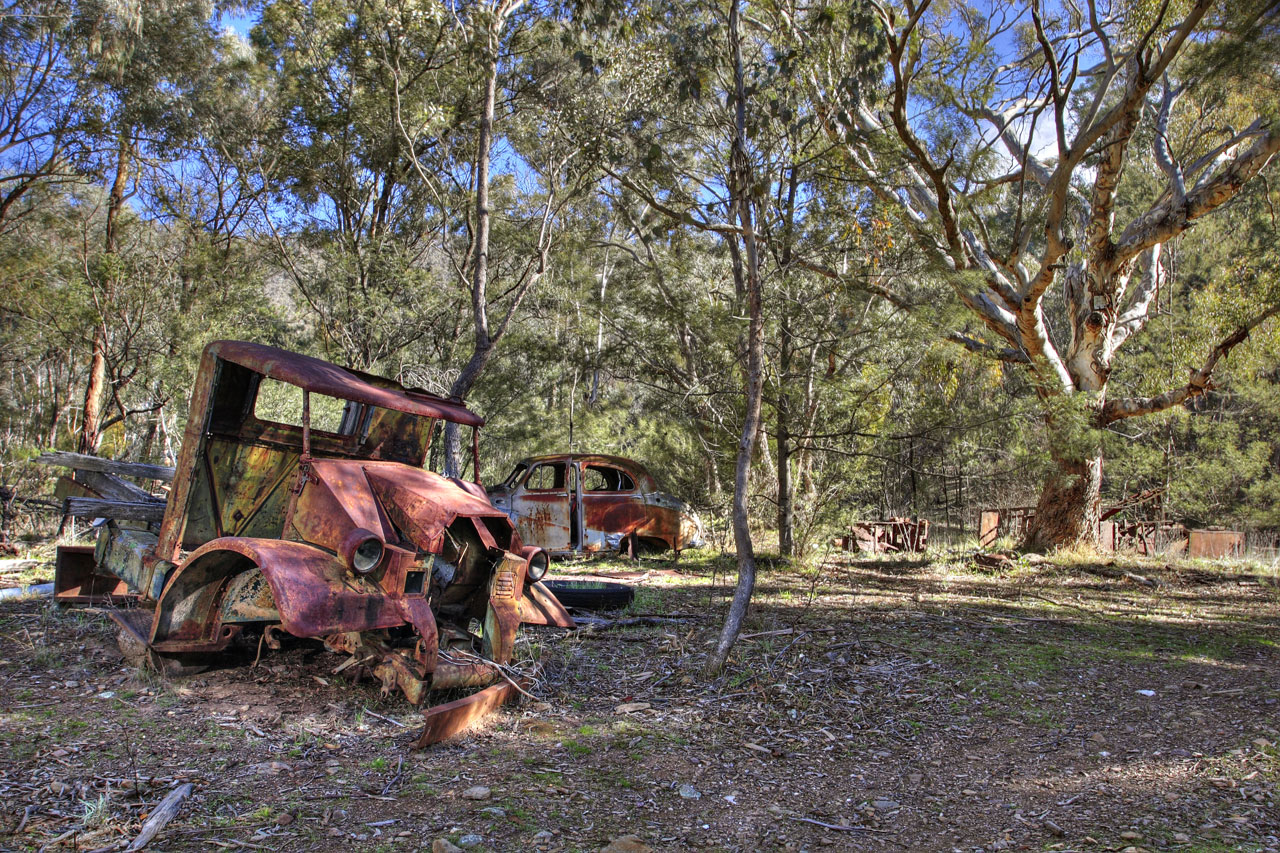
Remains of old automobiles in the ghost town of Cassilis, Victoria.

- Aberfeldy
- Bairnsdale (corruption of Bernisdale in Skye)
- Balmoral
- Bannockburn
- Bonnie Doon
- Buchan
- Cardross
- Cassilis
- Clunes
- Clyde
- Dallas
- Don Valley (Strathdon)
- Donald
- Dunkeld
- Ensay
- Fingal
- Glenburn
- Glenmaggie
- Glenrowan
- Glenthompson
- Grampians National Park, home of the Grampian mountain range,
- Hamilton
- Invergordon
- Inverloch
- Jamieson
- Kilmore
- Lismore, Victoria
- Loch
- Lorne
- Niddrie
- Orbost
- Rutherglen
- St Andrews
- Scotsburn
- Skye
- Strathbogie
- Strathmerton
- Strathmore
- Melbourne Suburbs
  - Abbotsford
  - Aberfeldie
  - Ardeer
  - Armadale
  - Arthurs Seat (Arthur's Seat)
  - Baxter
  - Blairgowrie
  - Cairnlea
  - Calder Park
  - Carnegie from Andrew Carnegie
  - Craigieburn
  - Dallas
  - Glen Eira
  - Glen Huntly
  - Glen Iris
  - Glen Waverley (tribute to Scott, cf Ivanhoe, Victoria)
  - Glenroy
  - Kilsyth
  - Knoxfield
  - Macleod
  - McCrae
  - McKinnon
  - Montrose
  - St Kilda and St Kilda East

Ivanhoe is named after the Walter Scott novel, Ivanhoe.

== Western Australia ==
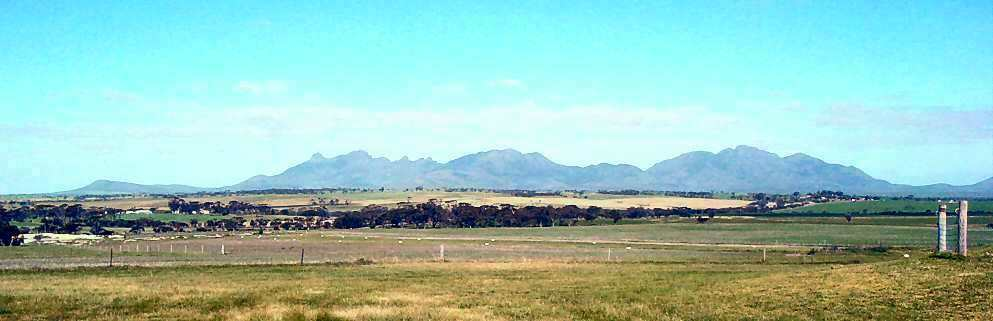
Stirling Range from the north

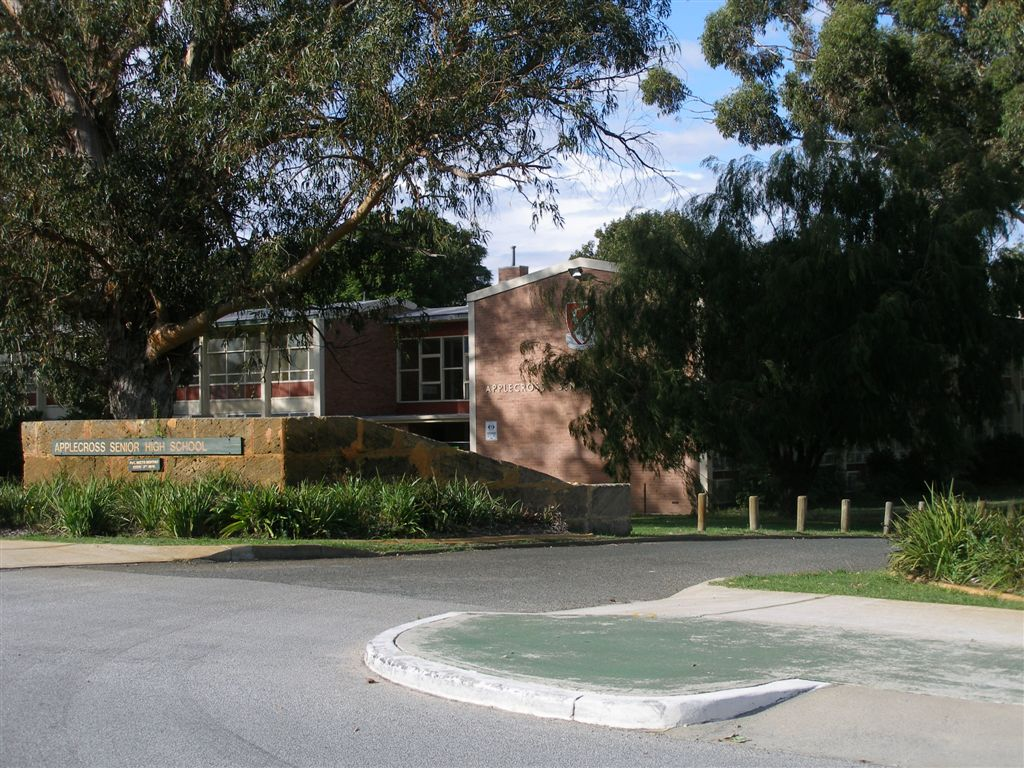
Applecross Senior High School, located in Ardross, WA

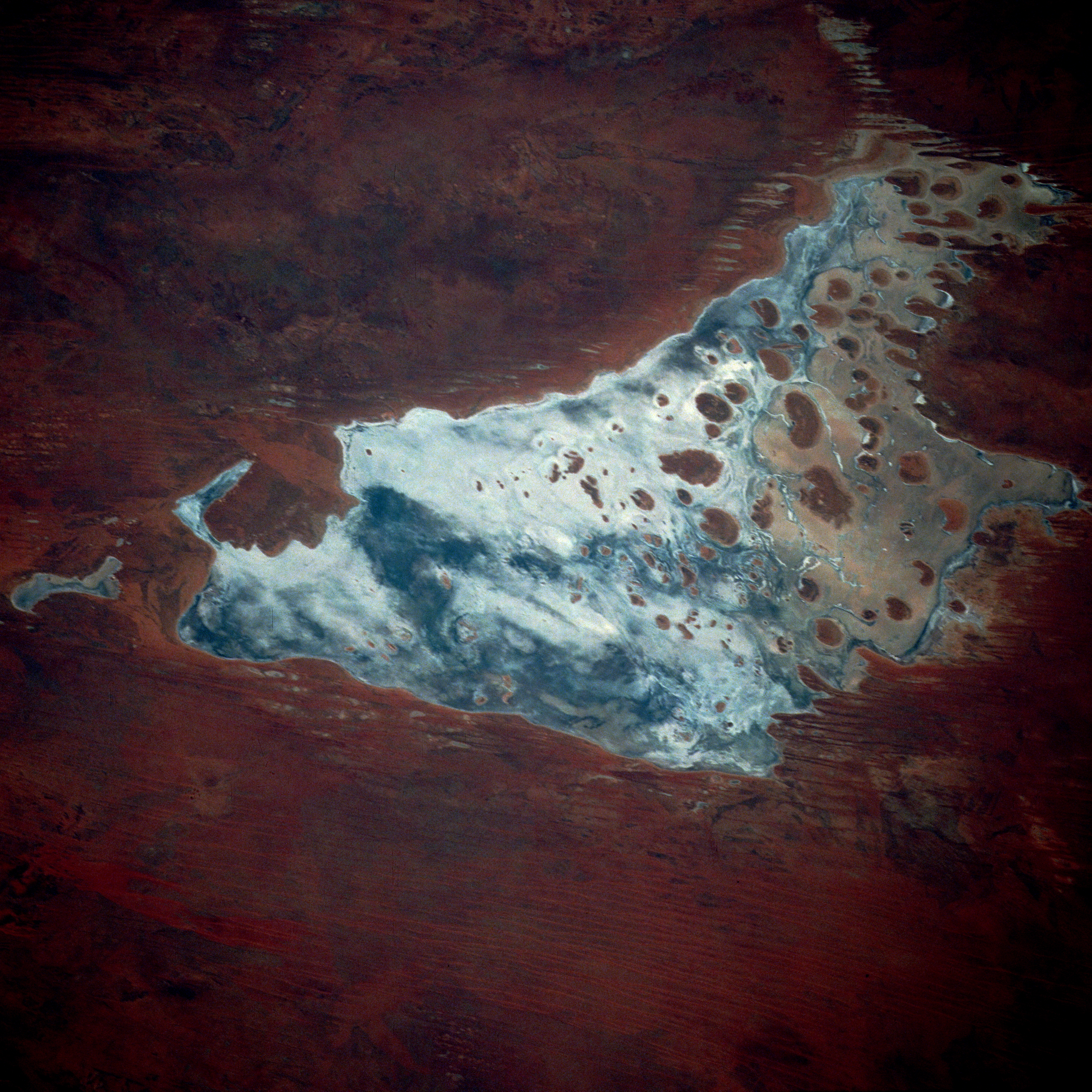
Lake Mackay from space, November 1989

- Albany (Albany an old name for Scotland, cf Alba)
- Agnew
- Lake Argyle
- Balfour Downs
- Bruce Rock
- Carnegie
- Erskine
- Geikie Gorge
- Glen Iris
- Lake Mackay
- Marvel Loch
- Menzies
- Murchison and Murchison River, Western Australia
- Murray Street
- Perth
- Stirling Range
- Perth Suburbs
  - Applecross
  - Ardross
  - Armadale and City of Armadale
  - Attadale
  - Bassendean
  - Brigadoon
  - Burns Beach
  - City of Cockburn and Cockburn Central
  - Craigie
  - Dalkeith
  - Duncraig
  - Eglinton
  - Hamilton Hill
  - Henderson
  - Kinross
  - Marmion
  - Murdoch
  - Port Kennedy
  - Queens Park
  - Stirling and City of Stirling

== See also ==
- Scottish Australians
- List of place names of Dutch origin in Australia
- List of locations in Australia with an English name
- Locations in Australia with a Welsh name
