= Cornish exonyms =

This is a list of exonyms in the Cornish language – place names used in Cornish that differ from the names used locally or officially.

== Countries ==
English name	Cornish name	Endonym	Notes
Belgium	Pow Belg	België, Belgique, Belgien	
Canada	Kanada	Canada	
Czech Republic	Repoblek Chek/Pow Chekk	Česko	
England	Pow Sows	England	
France	Pow Frynk	France	
Germany	Almayn	Deutschland	
Greece	Pow Grek	Ελλάδα (Elláda)	
India	Eynda		
Ireland	Wordhen, Iwordhon	Éire, Ireland	
Isle of Man	Manow	Mann, Mannin	
Kuwait	Koweyt	الكويت (al-Kuwayt)	
Lebanon	Lebnon	لبنان (Lubnān)	
Mexico	Meksiko	México	
Netherlands	Iseldiryow	Nederland	
New Zealand	Mordir Nowydh	New Zealand	
Norway	Norgagh	Noreg	
Palestine	Palestayn	فلسطين (Filasṭīn)	
Poland	Poloni	Polska	
Portugal	Portyngal	Portugal	
Russia	Russi	Россия (Rossiya)	
Saudi Arabia	Arabi Saoudek	السعودية (al-ʿArabiyya as-Suʿūdiyya)	
Scotland	Alban	Scotland, Alba	
Spain	Spayn	España	
Switzerland	Swistir	Schweiz, Suisse, Svizzera	
Syria	Syri	سورية (Sūriyā)	
United Kingdom	Ruvaneth Unys, Breten	United Kingdom, Britain	
United States	Statys Unys	United States	
Wales	Kembra	Wales, Cymru	

== Australia ==
English name	Cornish name	Endonym	Notes
Australian Capital Territory	Tiredh an Bennsita Ostralek	Australian Capital Territory	
Launceston	Lannstevan	Launceston	
Northern Territory	Tiredh an Kledhbarth	Northern Territory	

== Belgium ==
English name	Cornish name	Endonym	Notes
Brussels	Brussel	Brussel Bruxelles	
Flanders	Pow Flamanek	Vlaanderen	
Wallonia	Walloni	Wallonie Wallonien	

== Canada ==
English name	Cornish name	Endonym	Notes
Newfoundland	Tir Nowydh	Newfoundland; Terre-Neuve; Ktaqmkuk	
Nova Scotia	Alban Nowydh	Nova Scotia; Alba Nuadh; Nouvelle-Écosse; Nopa Sko'sia	

== Czech Republic ==
English name	Cornish name	Endonym	Notes
Bohemia	Bohem	Čechy	

== England ==
English name	Cornish name	Endonym	Notes
Cambridge	Kargront	Cambridge	
Canterbury	Kargens	Canterbury	
Carlisle	Karliwelydh	Carlisle	
Chester	Kardeva	Chester	Deva was the Celtic name for the River Dee on which Chester stands
Chichester	Kargisi	Chichester	Named after Cissa, the son of Ælle, king of the South Saxons
Cirencester	Kargyrn	Cirencester	The Ancient Greek name Korinion derives from the same root as the name for Cornwall, but the second element changed due to Norman influence
Exeter	Karesk	Exeter	
London	Loundres	London	
Oxford	Rysoghen	Oxford	
Plymouth	Aberplymm	Plymouth	
Somerset	Gwlas an Hav	Somerset	
York	Evrek	York	

== France ==
English name	Cornish name	Endonym	Notes
Brittany	Breten Vyghan	Bretagne; Breizh; Bertaèyn	
Rennes	Roazon	Rennes; Roazhon; Resnn	

== Greece ==
English name	Cornish name	Endonym	Notes
Athens	Athenys	Αθήνα (Athína); Ἀθῆναι (Athênai)	

== Ireland ==
English name	Cornish name	Endonym	Notes
Dublin	Dulyn	Dublin; Baile Átha Cliath	Same name in Welsh

== Italy ==
English name	Cornish name	Endonym	Notes
Rome	Rom	Roma	

== Mexico ==
English name	Cornish name	Endonym	Notes
Baja California	Kaliforni Isel	Baja California	

== Palestine ==
English name	Cornish name	Endonym	Notes
Jerusalem	Yerusalem	القُدس (Al-Quds) יְרוּשָׁלַיִם (Yerushaláyim)	

== Saudi Arabia ==
English name	Cornish name	Endonym	Notes
Mecca	Mekka	مكة (Makka)	

== Scotland ==
English name	Cornish name	Endonym	Notes
Edinburgh	Karedin	Edinburgh; Dùn Èideann	

== Spain ==
English name	Cornish name	Endonym	Notes
Basque Country	Pow Bask	Euskadi; País Vasco; Pays Basque	
Catalonia	Kataloni	Catalunya; Cataluña	

== Syria ==
English name	Cornish name	Endonym	Notes
Damascus	Damaskus	دمشق (Dimašq) ܕܰܪܡܣܘܩ (Darmswq)	

== United States ==
English name	Cornish name	Endonym	Notes
Maryland	Tir Maria	Maryland	

== Wales ==
English name	Cornish name	Endonym	Notes
Anglesey	Enys Mon	Ynys Môn; Anglesey	
Brecon	Aberhondhu	Brecon; Aberhonddu	
Caerphilly	Karfili	Caerphilly; Caerffili	
Cardiff	Kardydh	Cardiff; Caerdydd	
Carmarthen	Karverdhin	Carmarthen; Caerfyrddin	
Clwyd	Kloes	Clwyd	
Dyfed	Dyves	Dyfed	
Holyhead	Kargybi	Holyhead; Caergybi	
Merthyr Tydfil	Merthyr Tusvil	Merthyr Tydfil; Merthyr Tudful	
Newport	Kasnowydh	Newport; Casnewydd	
Snowdon	An Wodhva	Snowdon; Yr Wyddfa	
Swansea	Abertawa	Swansea; Abertawe	

== Miscellaneous ==
=== International organisations ===
English name	Cornish name	Notes
African Union	Unys Afrika	
Arab League	Kesunyans Arab	
ASEAN (Association of Southeast Asian Nations)	KWKASE (Kowethas Kenedhlow Asi Soth-Est)	
Commonwealth of Nations	Kemmynwlas a Genedhlow	
European Union	Unyans Europek	
NATO (North Atlantic Treaty Organization)	KOKAN (Kowethyans Kevambos an Atlantek Kledh)	
United Nations	Kenedhlow Unys	
World Health Organization	Kowethyans Yeghes an Bys	
World Trade Organization	Kowethyans Kenwerth an Bys	

=== Oceans and seas ===
English name	Cornish name	Literal meaning	Notes
Arctic Ocean	Keynvor Arktek	Arctic Ocean	
Atlantic Ocean	Keynvor Atlantek	Atlantic Ocean	
Baltic Sea	Mor Baltek	Baltic Sea	
Black Sea	Mor Du	Black Sea	
Caribbean Sea	Mor Karib	Carib(bean) Sea	
Caspian Sea	Mor Kaspian	Caspian Sea	
Celtic Sea	Mor Keltek	Celtic Sea	
Dead Sea	Mor Marow	Dead Sea	
English Channel	Mor Bretannek	British Sea	
Indian Ocean	Keynvor Eyndek	Indian Ocean	
Mediterranean Sea	Kresvor	Middle sea	Blend of "kres" (middle) and "vor" (sea, mutation of "mor")
North Sea	Mor Kledh	North Sea	
Pacific Ocean	Keynvor Hebask	Peaceful Ocean	
Red Sea	An Mor Rudh	The sea red	
Sea of Japan	Mor Japan, Mor Nihon	Sea of Japan	
South China Sea	Mor China Deghow	South China Sea	
Southern Ocean	Keynvor Deghow	South(ern) Ocean	
Tasman Sea	Mor Tasman, Mor Tasmani	Tasman Sea, Sea of Tasmania	

== See also ==
- List of European exonyms
- Welsh exonyms
