= National Route 25 (Argentina) =

Highway in Argentina

National Route 25
- Ruta nacional 25

Route information
- Length: 534 km (332 mi)

Major junctions
- Western end: Tecka
- Eastern end: Rawson

Location
- Country: Argentina

Highway system
- Highways in Argentina

National Route 25 is a 534-kilometer-long paved highway that runs through the center of Chubut Province, Argentina. It extends from the juncture with National Route 40 in Tecka to the bridge on the Chubut River in the city of Rawson. The highway crosses the Patagonian Steppe, joining sparsely populated areas.

== History ==
This route was established by the Tehuelche people to journey between the coasts in the winter and the Andes in the summer. The route borders the Chubut River, which is the only source of potable water on the journey. After the establishment of Welsh colonies in the valley below, and encouraged by news sent from the Andes by Wisel (also spelled Huisel, Wissale or Wishel) and then by other caciques, John Daniel Evans ventured on this route in late 1885 together with Governor Luis Jorge Fontana in an expedition called Riflemen of Chubut (Rifleros del Chubut). Years later and after a second expedition, Evans guided the first group of colonists to definitively establish themselves in the mountain range, linking the coast and the October 16 Colony (Colonia 16 de Octubre) (renamed Trevelin in 1918) on November 20, 1888.

The crossing of the Chubut River was made by raft until the construction of a bridge in 1957-1958.

On September 7, 2004, the National Highway Authority (Dirección Nacional de Vialidad) and Provincial Highway Authority (Administración de Vialidad Provincial) signed an agreement exchanging Provincial Route 62 between Tecka and Pampa de Agnia (paved between 1974 and 1976) for National Route 25 (unpaved) between Pampa de Agnia and National Route 40 (marked in green on the map). This agreement was ratified by Provincial Law 5486 promulgated on May 31, 2006.

== Route description ==
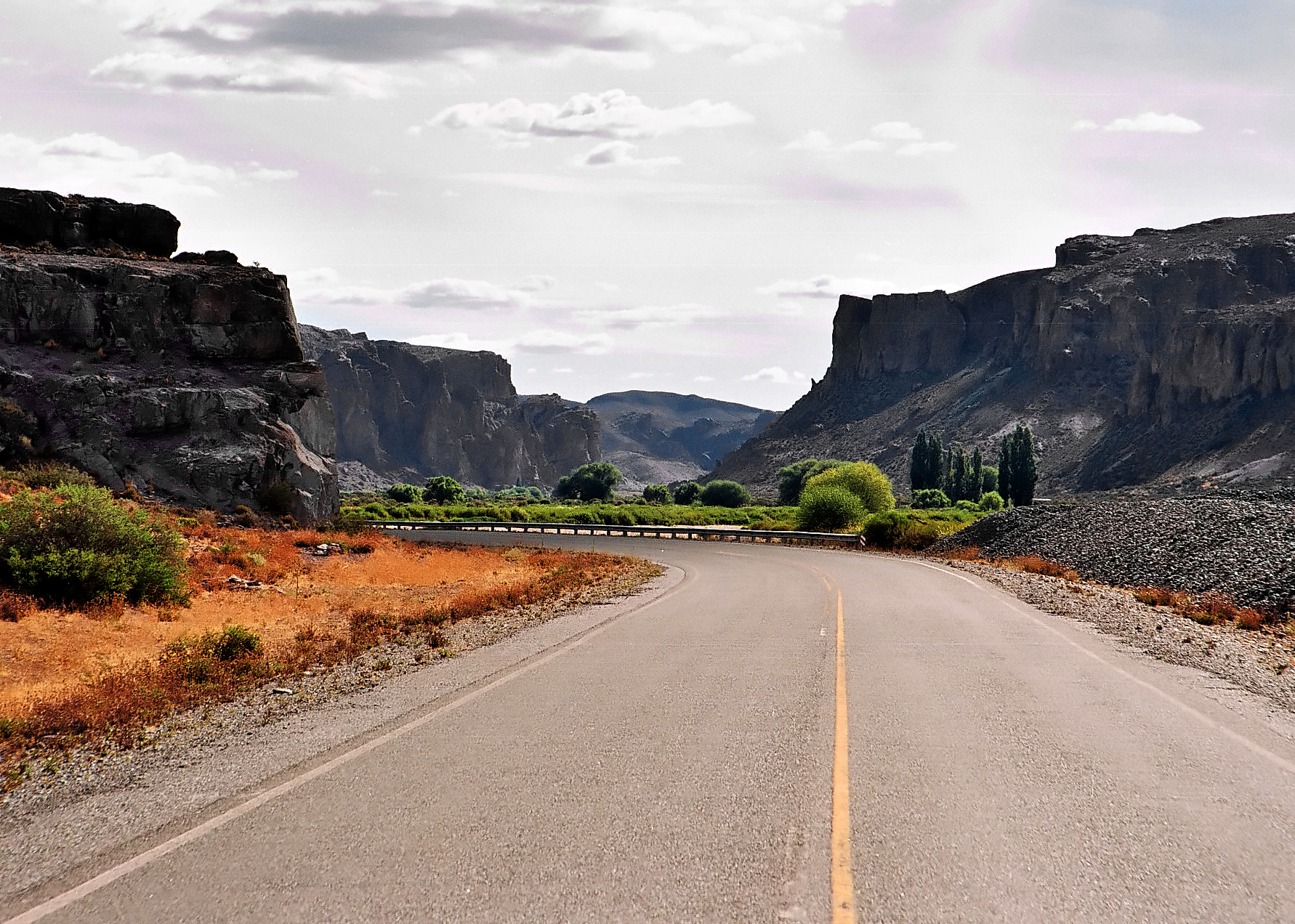
National Route 25 in Los Altares

National Route 25 passes through the following towns (from east to west):

- Rawson (km 0-1)
- Trelew (km 17)
- Gaiman (km 38)
- Dolavon (km 56)
- Las Plumas (km 205)
- Los Altares (km 309)
- Paso de Indios (km 365)
- Tecka (km 534)
