= Paso de Indios Department =

- Departamento Paso de Indios
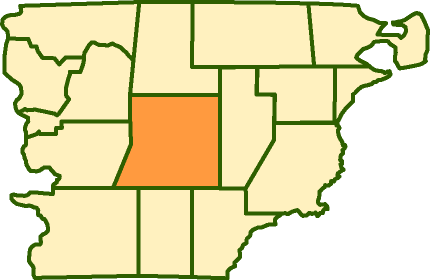
- Coordinates: 43°51′S 69°02′W
- Country: Argentina
- Province: Chubut
- Capital: Paso de Indios

Area
  - Total: 22,300 km^{2} (8,600 sq mi)

Population (2001)
  - Total: 1,905
  - Density: 0.1/km^{2} (0.3/sq mi)
- Post Code: U9207

Paso de Indios Department is a department of Chubut Province in Argentina.

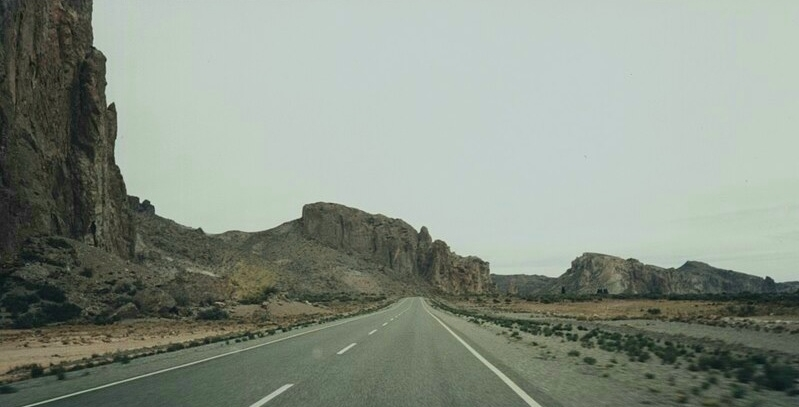
Highway 25, near Los Altares

The provincial subdivision has a population of about 1,905 inhabitants in an area of 22,300 km^{2}, and its capital city is Paso de Indios, which is located around 1,729 km from the Capital federal.

== Settlements ==
- Los Altares
- Cerro Cóndor
- Paso de Indios
