= Cerro Cóndor =

Coordinates: 43°25′16″S 69°09′47″W

Cerro Cóndor Craig yr Eryr
- Municipality and village
- Interactive map of Cerro Cóndor
- Country: Argentina
- Province: Chubut Province
- Department: Paso de Indios Department
- Time zone: UTC−3 (ART)

Cerro Cóndor (Welsh: Craig yr Eryr) is a village and municipality in Chubut Province in southern Argentina.
