= Welsh place names in other countries =

Welsh toponyms outside of Wales

This is a list of place-names in countries outside of Wales which are named after places in Wales, or derived from the Welsh language, or are known to be named after a Welsh person.

== Argentina ==
- Chubut
  - Dolavon - from Dolafon, the Welsh for 'meadow by the river'.
  - Puerto Madryn - named after the Welsh estate of Sir Love Jones-Parry.
  - Trelew - named after Welsh settler Lewis Jones.
  - Trevelin - from Trefelin, the Welsh for 'Mill Town'.

== Australia ==
- New South Wales - Captain James Cook originally called it 'New Wales', later adding the 'South'.
  - Aberdare
  - Aberglasslyn - likely corruption of Aberglaslyn
  - Abermain
  - Allynbrook - from River Alyn
  - Bangor - named after the birthplace of the landowner.
  - Cardiff - name suggested by a Welsh settler in 1889.
  - Llanarth - suburb of Bathurst, from Llanarth
  - Llandilo
  - Llangothlin - anglicisation of Llangollen
  - Swansea - a coal mining community.
- Queensland
  - Carnarvon Gorge
  - Ebbw Vale
  - Merthyr
  - Llanarth
- Tasmania
  - Abergavenny
  - Beaumaris named after Beaumaris
  - Swansea - settled by people from Pembrokeshire, Wales
- Victoria
  - Anglesea - corruption of Anglesey
  - Llanelly - either from Llanelly or Llanelli
  - Welshpool
- Western Australia
  - Carnarvon - named after Henry Herbert, 4th Earl of Carnarvon; anglicisation of Caernarfon
  - Welshpool
  - Perth [Brythonic/Pictish/Old Welsh from the Scottish City of Perth]

== Canada ==
- Alberta
  - Berwyn
  - Caernarvon
  - Cardiff - a hamlet near Alberta's first coal mine.
- Ontario
  - Bala - It is considered one of the hubs of cottage country located north of Toronto.
  - Cardiff - a small mining community.
  - Pontypool - unincorporated village, used as the setting for a movie of the same name
  - Pembroke, Ontario on the Ottawa River.

== England ==
- Herefordshire: Numerous villages, parishes and farms in the Archenfield region adjacent to Wales, including:
  - Bagwyllydiart
  - Ewyas Harold
  - Llangarron
  - Llanveynoe
  - Maes-coed
  - Pontrilas
- Shropshire: Numerous villages, parishes and farms, notably in the Oswestry area adjacent to Wales, including:
  - Bettws-y-Crwyn
  - Brogyntyn
  - Bryn-y-Cochin
  - Coed-y-Go
  - Craigllwyn
  - Croesau Bach
  - Hengoed
  - Llanforda
  - Llanyblodwel
  - Llawnt
  - Llynclys
  - Nant-y-Gollen
  - Pant
  - Pant Glas
  - Pentre Pant
  - Rhyn
  - Selattyn
  - Trefonen
  - Wern Ddu
- Worcestershire:
  - Malvern
  - Pensax

== Jamaica ==
Welsh settlers arrived on the island, most notably the infamous Welsh governor, Henry Morgan, and influenced placenames.

- Bangor Ridge (Portland)
- Llandilo (Westmoreland)
- Llandovery (St Ann)
- Llandewey (St Thomas)

== Nepal ==
- Western Cwm - a glacial valley on the face of Mount Everest (cwm is Welsh for 'valley')

== New Zealand ==
- North Island
  - Brynderwyn Range
  - Cardiff
- South Island
  - Bryndwr (Christchurch)
  - Milford Sound

== South Africa ==
- Llandudno, Cape Town

== United States ==
- Alabama
  - Bangor
  - Cardiff
  - Powell
- Arizona
  - Swansea - a former copper mining town.
- California
  - Bryn Mawr
  - Cardiff-by-the-Sea
  - Swansea - a former mining town.
- Illinois
  - Bryn Mawr
  - Cardiff - formerly a coal mining town
  - Swansea
- Kansas
  - Powell Observatory in Wea Township, Miami County
- Kentucky
  - Owensboro - named for Abraham Owen.
- Maine
  - Bangor
  - Pembroke
- Maryland
  - Berwyn Heights
  - Cardiff - formerly a slate mining town
- Massachusetts
  - Pembroke
  - Swansea
- Michigan
  - Howell
  - Howell Township, Livingston
- Minnesota
  - Bryn Mawr
- Missouri
  - Howell
  - Howell County
  - Powell, Cass County
  - Powell Gardens in Kingsville
  - Powell Hall, St. Louis
  - Powell, McDonald County
- Nebraska
  - Powell
- New Jersey
  - Howell Township, Monmouth County
  - Monmouth County
- New York
  - Bangor
  - Pembroke
- Ohio
  - Powell
- Pennsylvania See Welsh tract for more information
  - Bala Cynwyd
  - Bangor - the first Chief Burgess an emigrant from Wales.
  - Berwyn
  - Bryn Athyn
  - Bryn Mawr - founded by Welsh Quakers.
  - Caernarvon Township
  - Upper Gwynedd and Lower Gwynedd Townships.
  - Haverford
  - Montgomery County
  - Narberth
  - Nanty Glo - from the Welsh nant y glo, stream of coal.
  - North Wales
  - Radnor Township
  - Tredyffrin Township
- South Carolina
  - Swansea
- South Dakota
  - Powell, Edmunds County
  - Powell, Haakon County
- Tennessee
  - Cardiff - an iron and coal mining town
  - Powell
- Texas
  - Powell
- Utah
  - Howell
  - Lake Powell on the border between San Juan & Kane counties
- Wisconsin
  - Powell
- Wyoming
  - Powell

== See also ==
- Welsh exonyms
- Welsh placenames
- Welsh settlement in the Americas
- Welsh settlement in Argentina
- Welsh Tract, Pennsylvania
