= Nant-y-Gollen =

Village in Shropshire, England

Coordinates: 52.852°N 3.122°W

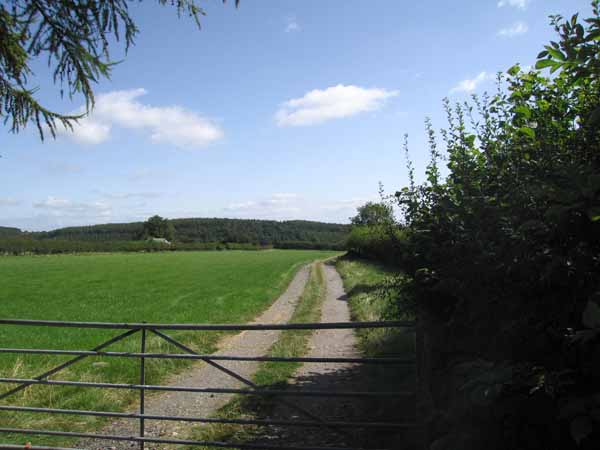
Farm access track near Nant-y-gollen

Nant-y-Gollen is a village in Shropshire in England.
