= Paso de Indios =

Paso de Indios Rhyd yr Indiaid
- Town
- Location of Paso de Indios in Argentina
- Coordinates: 43°51′50″S 69°02′50″W
- Country: Argentina
- Province: Chubut
- Department: Paso de Indios

Government
  - Intendant: Héctor Eduardo Méndez
- Elevation: 575 m (1,886 ft)

Population
  - Total: 1,087
- Time zone: UTC−3 (ART)
- CPA base: U9207
- Dialing code: +54 2965
- Climate: BSk

Paso de Indios (Welsh: Rhyd yr Indiaid) is a town in Chubut Province, Argentina. It is the head town of the Paso de Indios Department.

== Climate ==
Climate data for Paso de Indios (1971–1990, extremes 1969–2016)
Month	Jan	Feb	Mar	Apr	May	Jun	Jul	Aug	Sep	Oct	Nov	Dec	Year
Record high °C (°F)	39.9 (103.8)	38.4 (101.1)	36.0 (96.8)	32.6 (90.7)	29.4 (84.9)	23.6 (74.5)	21.0 (69.8)	23.3 (73.9)	27.6 (81.7)	32.4 (90.3)	35.8 (96.4)	38.8 (101.8)	39.9 (103.8)
Mean daily maximum °C (°F)	26.4 (79.5)	25.8 (78.4)	22.6 (72.7)	17.6 (63.7)	12.6 (54.7)	8.9 (48.0)	8.7 (47.7)	11.1 (52.0)	15.1 (59.2)	18.7 (65.7)	22.1 (71.8)	25.0 (77.0)	17.9 (64.2)
Daily mean °C (°F)	18.6 (65.5)	18.0 (64.4)	15.2 (59.4)	11.4 (52.5)	7.3 (45.1)	4.3 (39.7)	3.7 (38.7)	5.7 (42.3)	8.7 (47.7)	11.4 (52.5)	14.7 (58.5)	17.4 (63.3)	11.4 (52.5)
Mean daily minimum °C (°F)	10.1 (50.2)	9.6 (49.3)	7.0 (44.6)	4.0 (39.2)	0.9 (33.6)	−1.3 (29.7)	−2.1 (28.2)	−0.8 (30.6)	1.1 (34.0)	3.8 (38.8)	6.5 (43.7)	9.0 (48.2)	4.0 (39.2)
Record low °C (°F)	−3.5 (25.7)	−1.2 (29.8)	−10.7 (12.7)	−13.5 (7.7)	−17.6 (0.3)	−24.2 (−11.6)	−22.1 (−7.8)	−17.9 (−0.2)	−18.1 (−0.6)	−12.0 (10.4)	−8.1 (17.4)	−4.6 (23.7)	−24.2 (−11.6)
Average precipitation mm (inches)	7.6 (0.30)	12.7 (0.50)	11.5 (0.45)	16.4 (0.65)	26.0 (1.02)	22.9 (0.90)	23.9 (0.94)	18.0 (0.71)	17.4 (0.69)	13.7 (0.54)	8.0 (0.31)	9.2 (0.36)	187.3 (7.37)
Average precipitation days (≥ 0.1 mm)	2	3	4	5	8	8	7	6	6	5	4	3	61
Average relative humidity (%)	40.0	43.0	47.5	53.0	64.5	69.5	68.5	61.5	54.5	47.5	44.0	41.5	52.9
Mean monthly sunshine hours	282.1	257.1	223.2	159.0	133.3	108.0	120.9	148.8	171.0	229.4	249.0	263.5	2,345.3
Percentage possible sunshine	61.0	65.5	57.0	48.0	44.5	39.5	41.0	45.5	47.5	55.0	56.5	54.5	51.3
Source 1: Secretaria de Mineria
Source 2: Servicio Meteorológico Nacional (precipitation days 1961–1990 and extremes)
