= Tecka =

- Town
- Location of Tecka in Argentina
- Coordinates: 43°28′S 70°47′W
- Country: Argentina
- Province: Chubut
- Department: Languiñeo

Government
  - Intendant: Jorge Seitune
- Elevation: 912 m (2,992 ft)

Population
  - Total: 955
- Time zone: UTC−3 (ART)
- CPA base: U9201
- Dialing code: +54 2945
- Climate: BSk

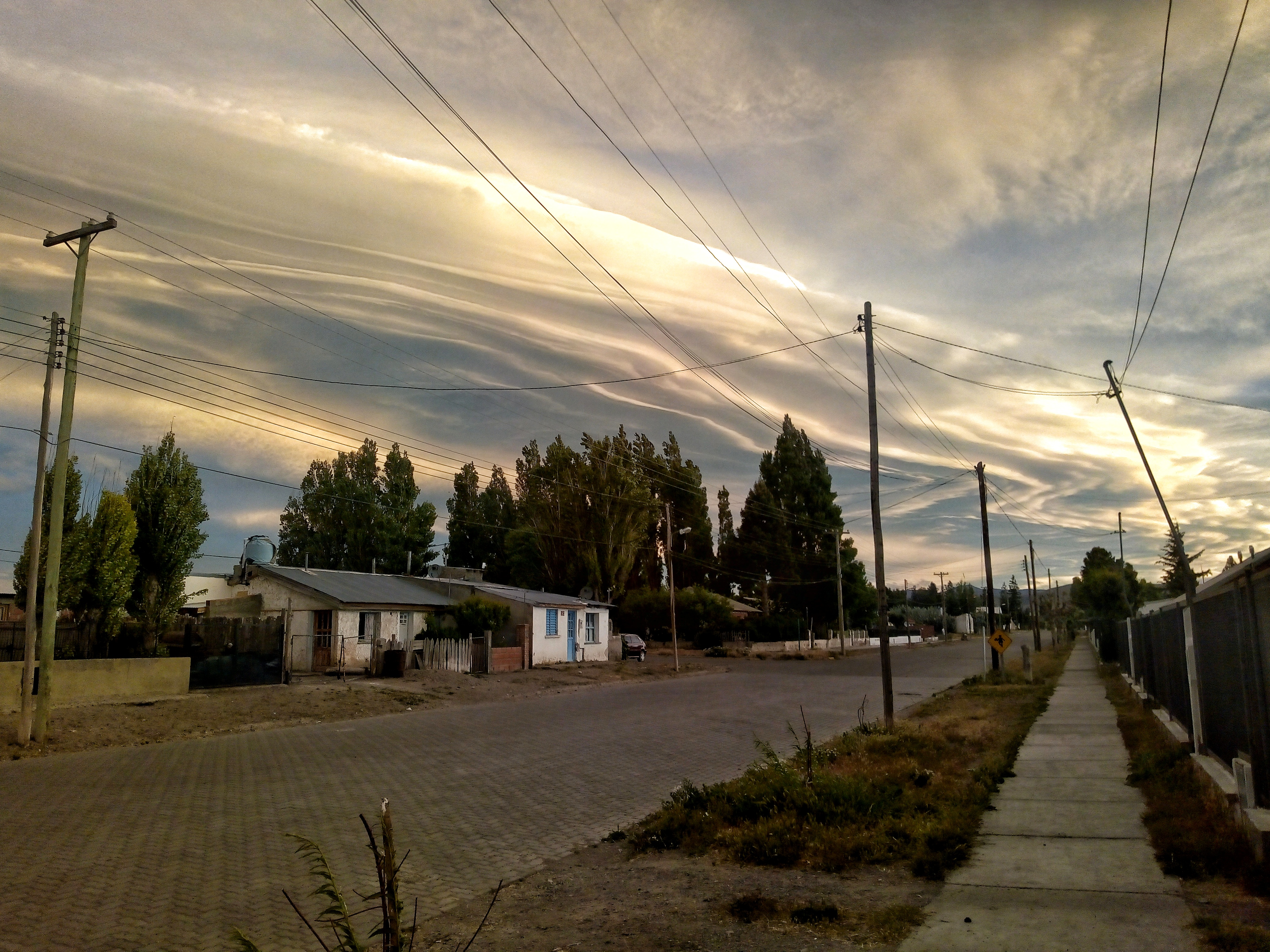
Tecka

Tecka is a town in Chubut Province, Argentina, located 100 kilometres (62 mi) south of Esquel and around 500 kilometres (310 mi) west of Rawson along National Route 25. It is the seat of the Languiñeo Department.

== History ==
Tecka was a winter settlement of nomadic indigenous peoples, especially Tehuelche people; it was later an important Mapuche encampment. One of the principal sites of interest in Tecka is the tomb of the cacique Inacayal (1835–88). Though Inacayal died in La Plata after being imprisoned by the national government as part of the Conquest of the Desert, his remains, which are displayed in a glass case, were brought many years later to Tecka, his place of origin.

The town of Tecka was officially founded on July 11, 1921.

== Economy ==
Tecka has a predominantly agricultural economy, where there is extensive raising of sheep and pastures for the grazing of cows. In the surrounding area there are important ranches. Mining is a possibility for economic development in the future; there are prospected deposits of platinum, gold, basalt, semiprecious stones, and decorative rocks nearby. In terms of tourism, there is fishing in the Pescado River, the Tecka River basin, and nearby lakes. There is also horseback riding and trekking.

== Demographics ==
Tecka had 955 inhabitants at the 2001 census, a decrease of 5.8% from the population of 1,014 recorded in the previous census in 1991.
