= Alejandro Bulgheroni =

Argentine billionaire businessman

- Born: Alejandro Pedro Bulgheroni; 24 October 1943 (age 83); Rufino, Santa Fe Province, Argentina
- Education: University of Buenos Aires
- Occupation: Businessman
- Title: Vice president, Bridas
- Spouse: Bettina Bulgheroni
- Children: 7
- Relatives: Carlos Bulgheroni (brother)

Alejandro Pedro Bulgheroni (born 24 October 1943) is an Argentine billionaire businessman in the oil and gas sector. Following his education at the University of Buenos Aires, he joined his father's company, the Bridas Corporation, founded by the Bulgheroni family in 1948. Following expansion by the company, half of it was sold to the Chinese state-run CNOOC Group in 2010. As of March 2022, his net worth is estimated at US$1.9 billion.

== Early life ==
Alejandro Bulgheroni was born in Rufino, Santa Fe Province, to a Spanish mother and an Italian father, also called Alejandro Bulgheroni. He was educated at the University of Buenos Aires, from where he obtained a degree in Industrial Engineering. His younger brother was Carlos Bulgheroni (1945–2016).

== Career ==
Bulgheroni joined his father Alejandro in the Bridas Corporation, in 1965 when he was 22 years old. Bridas founded by the Bulgheroni family in 1948 and by the 1970s one of the largest private firms in the Argentine energy sector. The senior Bulgheroni died in 1985 and left a controlling stake in the firm to Alejandro and his younger brother Carlos.

Bulgheroni obtained, in 1992, some of the first gas exploration concessions granted in Turkmenistan to a foreign energy company. He was further involved during 1997 in negotiations between Bridas and the ruling Taliban faction in Afghanistan to build the Trans-Afghanistan Gas Pipeline from Turkmenistan to Pakistan. These negotiations were in competition with those undertaken by Unocal, and although an agreement with Unocal-led corporation CentGas was reached, the deal was forfeited in January 1998 in favor of one with Bridas. Instability in Afghanistan delayed construction of the pipeline, however, and following the United States Invasion of Afghanistan in October 2001, the Bridas contract was rescinded in favor of the former one with Unocal. In 2006, Bulgheroni indicated interest in Bridas' involvement with the Trans-Afghanistan Pipeline project, which continued to be hampered by the ongoing chaos in the Central Asian nation.

In 2010, Bulgheroni sold 50 percent of Bridas to the Chinese state-run CNOOC Group, which was followed by the acquisition of Axion Energy Argentina in 2012, along with ExxonMobil’s crude-oil refineries and fuel and lubricants trading assets in Paraguay, Argentina and Uruguay.

== Personal life ==
He is married, with seven children, and resides in Manantiales, Uruguay. According to Forbes, he is Uruguay's only billionaire.

In 2016, his brother Carlos died of cancer at the age of 71.

As of March 2022, Forbes estimates his net worth to be $1.9 billion.

Bulgheroni also possesses several vineyards around the world, despite the fact that he stopped drinking upon marrying his second wife Bettina. One of his vineyards, Bodega Garzón, won the New World Winery of The Year for 2018 by the magazine, Wine Enthusiast.
