= Carlos Bulgheroni =

Argentine businessman

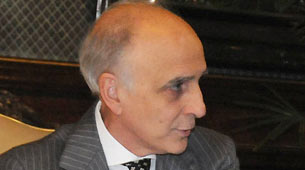
- Born: Carlos Alberto Bulgheroni; March 9, 1945; Rufino, Santa Fe, Argentina
- Died: September 3, 2016 (aged 71); Washington DC, US
- Education: University of Buenos Aires
- Occupations: CEO, Bridas
- Relatives: Alejandro Bulgheroni (brother)

Carlos Alberto Bulgheroni (March 9, 1945 – September 3, 2016) was an Argentine businessman prominent in the nation's energy sector, and the country's richest man at the time of his death.

== Early life ==
Carlos Bulgheroni was born in Rufino, Santa Fe Province, to a Spanish mother and an Italian father. He enrolled at the University of Buenos Aires, and earned a juris doctor in 1970. Bulgheroni developed lymphoma at age 24, but recovered.

== Career ==
He joined his father Alejandro in Bridas Corporation, founded by the Bulgheroni family in 1948 and by the 1970s one of the largest private firms in the Argentine energy sector. The senior Bulgheroni died in 1985 and left a controlling stake in the firm to Carlos and his elder brother, Alejandro. Carlos Bulgheroni became the firm's chief political point man, establishing good working relationships with the various administrations in power since 1983. He was named president and chairman in 1993; president of the BP-controlled PanAmerican Energy in 1997; of Allis-Chalmers's energy unit in 2006; and of EDIC, a company specializing in the exploration and production of oil and natural gas in the North African, Russian, Central Asian, and Middle and Far Eastern markets.

Bulgheroni obtained, in 1992, some of the first gas exploration concessions granted in Turkmenistan to a foreign energy company. He was further involved during 1997 in negotiations between Bridas and the ruling Taliban faction in Afghanistan to build the Trans-Afghanistan Gas Pipeline from Turkmenistan to Pakistan. These negotiations were in competition with those undertaken by Unocal, and although an agreement with Unocal-led corporation CentGas was reached, the deal was forfeited in January 1998 in favor of one with Bridas. Instability in Afghanistan delayed construction of the pipeline, however, and following the United States Invasion of Afghanistan in October 2001, the Bridas contract was rescinded in favor of the former one with Unocal. In 2006, Bulgheroni indicated interest in Bridas' involvement with the Trans-Afghanistan Pipeline project, which continued to be hampered by the ongoing chaos in the Central Asian nation.

Bulgheroni is a co-founder of the Colón Theatre Foundation (1978) and of the Federal District Police Foundation (1989); the latter helps maintain the Churruca Police Officers Hospital, in Buenos Aires. He is also a member of the Buenos Aires Stock Exchange, the Foundation for Latin American Economic Research (FIEL), the Peres Center for Peace, the Argentine Russian Business Council, and the Center for Strategic and International Studies (CSIS). At CSIS, in addition to acting as a trustee, he also serves as an international councillor and a senior adviser to the Space Exploration Initiative.

He served as co-chairman of the International Committee at the Kennedy Center for the Performing Arts. He is the founder and current partner of the U.S. & Argentine Caucus. He was named Grand Officer of the Order of Merit of the Italian Republic. Previously, Bulgheroni served as president of the Argentine Business Council, as a member of the Business Advisory Board of the World Trade Organization in Geneva, as president and representative for Mercosur from 1990 to 2002 for the Mercosur European Business Forum, and as a member of the Executive Board of the ICC in Paris. The Bulgheroni brothers sold a 50% stake in Bridas to Chinese oil giant CNOOC in 2010 for US$3.1 billion. They retained a 20% stake in PanAmerican Energy (whose operations in Argentina had grown to become the nation's second-largest) through Bridas.

== Death ==
Bulgheroni died in Washington DC, on 3 September 2016.
