= Bulgheroni =

Bulgheroni is a surname of Italian origin. Notable people with this surname include:

- Alejandro Bulgheroni (born 1943), Argentine businessman in the oil and gas sector
- Carlo Bulgheroni (1928–1971), Italian ice hockey player
- Carlos Bulgheroni (1945–2016), Argentine businessman in the nation's energy sector
