= Bettina Bulgheroni =

Argentine businesswoman

- Born: Mendoza, Argentina
- Occupation: Businesswoman
- Spouse: Alejandro Bulgheroni (m. 1996)
- Children: 3 [citation needed]

Bettina Bulgheroni is an Argentine businesswoman, investor, and philanthropist. She is the president of Fundación Educando, an NGO with special consultative status in education and skill development for vulnerable communities in Argentina. In March 2024 Bulgheroni was appointed as Ambassador for the state-led 'Marca País Argentina' initiative. In May 2025 she became the first woman elected to lead the Argentine branch of the Inter-American Council for Trade and Production (CICyP), representing the Argentine Chamber of Commerce (CAC).

== Early life ==
Bettina Bulgheroni was born in Mendoza, Argentina. In 1996 she married Argentinian billionaire businessman Alejandro Bulgheroni.

== Career ==
In the 1990s, Bettina Bulgheroni worked in public administration as chief of staff to Interior Minister Carlos Corach during the presidency of Carlos Menem. She left public service after marrying businessman Alejandro Bulgheroni, chairman of Pan American Energy Group.

Following her marriage, Bulgheroni became involved in the family's business ventures, contributing to the diversification of their holdings into agriculture and agribusiness. This included the development of Agroland in Uruguay, which produces wines, olive oil, and renewable energy, as well as vineyards in Mendoza and Chubut. She has served since 2003 as president of Samconsult S.A., a consulting and corporate services company.

In March 2024, the Ministry of Foreign Affairs appointed Bulgheroni as Ambassador of Marca País Argentina. The initiative, led by the Office of the Chief of the Cabinet of Ministers, promotes Argentina's international brand. Daniel Scioli, Secretary of Tourism, Environment, and Sports, acknowledged Bulgheroni's global influence and life-long service in accreditation of her role as ambassador.

In May 2025, Bulgheroni was unanimously elected president of the Inter-American Council for Trade and Production (Consejo Interamericano de Comercio y Producción) CICyP), which represents major Argentine business chambers including the Sociedad Rural Argentina, the Unión Industrial Argentina, and the Bolsa de Comercio de Buenos Aires. She succeeded Marcos Pereda, vice president of the Sociedad Rural Argentina, becoming the first woman to lead the organisation since its founding in 1941. Her appointment was reported as a move that could improve relations between the business sector and the government, supported by her cordial relationship with Presidential Secretary General Karina Milei.

Bulgheroni also holds leadership roles in other organisations, including the presidency of LIDE Mujer Argentina, the women's leadership division of LIDE (Leaders in Business), and the Fundación Granaderos General San Martín, which supports the Argentine Presidential Horse Guards Regiment.

In May 2025, Argentine media reported that she acquired a majority stake in the Buenos Aires radio station FM Milenium 106.7, alongside its founder Santiago Pont Lezica.

== Philanthropy ==
=== Fundación Educando ===
Bulgheroni has presided over Fundación Educando since 1999. The organisation promotes non-formal education, inclusion, and skill development nationwide, with special consultative status at ECOSOC (2018) and registration with the OAS (2019).

In 2018, Bettina Bulgheroni sponsored a Latin GRAMMY Talent Tuition Scholarship through the Latin GRAMMY Cultural Foundation. The scholarship, valued at up to US$100,000, supported Puerto Rican student Gilmarie Villanueva, whose family had been affected by Hurricane María, in pursuing a four-year degree at the Berklee College of Music.

=== Arts and education ===
In 2024, Ben-Gurion University of the Negev and its international friends’ associations recognised Bulgheroni's contributions to education and social action during a ceremony held in Buenos Aires.

== Selected awards and honours ==
- 2025 — CEAPI Medal of Honor (Consejo Empresarial Alianza por Iberoamérica).
