= Afghanistan Oil Pipeline =

Oil pipeline project in Asia

Location
- Country: Turkmenistan, Afghanistan, Pakistan, India
- Direction: north–south
- Start: Türkmenabat, Turkmenistan
- Passes through: Afghanistan
- To: Pakistan's Arabian Sea Coast
- Runs alongside: Trans-Afghanistan Gas Pipeline

General information
- Type: Oil
- Owner: Unocal Corporation

Technical information
- Length: 1,000 mi (1,600 km)
- Maximum discharge: 1 million barrels per day (~5.0×10^{7} t/a)

The Afghanistan Oil Pipeline was a project proposed by several oil companies to transport oil from the Caspian region and Central Asia through Afghanistan to Pakistan.

== History ==
In the 1990s, the American Unocal Corporation, in addition to the Trans-Afghanistan Gas Pipeline, considered building a 1,600-kilometre-long (1,000 mi) 1,000,000 barrels per day (~5.0×10^{7} t/a) oil pipeline to link Türkmenabat in Turkmenistan to Pakistan's Arabian Sea coast. Through the Omsk (Russia) – Pavlodar (Kasakhstan) – Shymkent – Türkmenabat (Turkmenistan) pipeline, it would provide a possible alternative export route for regional oil production from the Caspian Sea. The pipeline was expected to cost US$2.5 billion. However, due to political and security instability at that time, the project was dismissed.

== Disputed theory ==
Some have proposed that the actual motive for the United States invasion of Afghanistan was Afghanistan's importance as a conduit for oil pipelines to Afghanistan's neighbouring countries, by effectively bypassing Russian and Iranian territories, and breaking the Russian and Iranian collective monopoly on regional energy supplies. Others have argued that the theoretical pipeline was not a significant reason for the invasion because most Western governments and their respective oil companies preferred an export route that went through the Caspian Sea to Azerbaijan then to Georgia and on to the Black Sea instead of one that goes through Afghanistan.

== See also ==
- Ashgabat Agreement
- International North–South Transport Corridor
