= Carolodarwinia =

Carolodarwinia Temporal range: Eocene (Mustersan) ~48–42 Ma

Scientific classification
- Kingdom: Animalia
- Phylum: Chordata
- Class: Mammalia
- Order: †Notoungulata
- Genus: †Carolodarwinia; Ameghino, 1901

Type species
- Carolodarwinia pyramidentata Ameghino, 1901

Extinct genus of indeterminate Notoungulate

Carolodarwinia is an extinct genus of indeterminate Notoungulate, who lived during the Mustersan stage of the Eocene in what is today Argentina. Its fossilized remains have been found near the Lake Colhué Huapí.

== History ==
Carolodarwinia was first described in 1901 by Florentino Ameghino, based on M.A.C.N. No. 10900, a right upper posterior premolar found in the Couches à Astraponotus, near what is today the Lake Colhué Huapí in Argentine Patagonia. Ameghino associated with this unique premolar several canines, now presumably lost. He considered the genus as belonging to the family Leontiniidae, and as a direct ancestor of the genus Leontinia. More recently, in 1967, George Gaylord Simpson acknowledged the loss of the fossilized canines, and preferred recovering as Notoungulata incertae sedis, based on the fragmentary and almost dubious status of the genus, on its dating and on slight differences between the premolar of the genus and those of later leontiniids.
