= Chico River (Lower Chubut) =

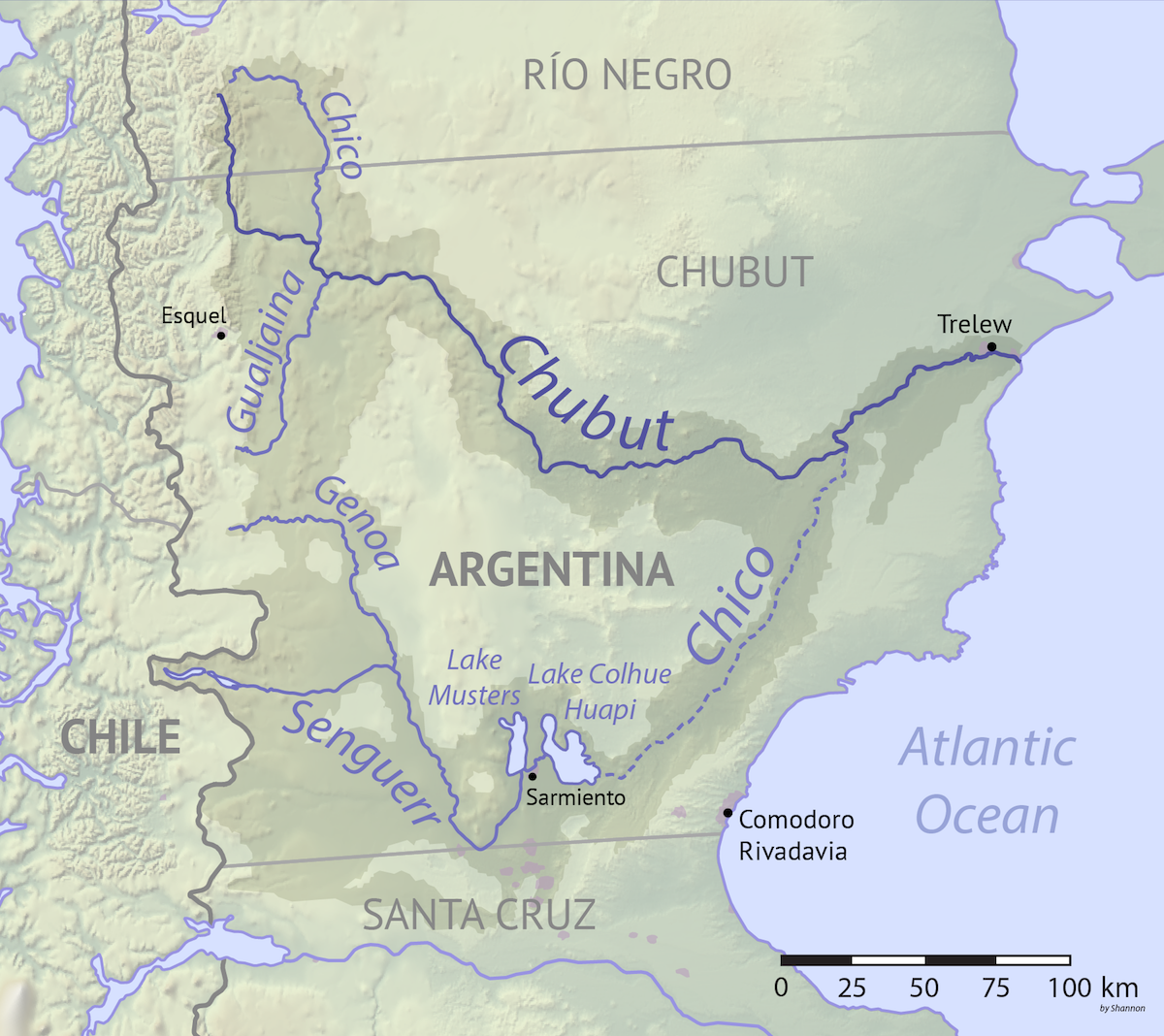
- Map of the Chubut drainage basin. Chico River is shown by the dotted line (lower right).

Location
- Country: Argentina

The Chico River is a river of Chubut Province, Argentina. It is about 300 kilometres (190 mi) long, flowing in a northeasterly direction from the vicinity of Lake Colhue Huapi. It is a tributary of the Chubut River, joining it at the Florentino Ameghino Dam.

Before 1939 water from the Senguerr River entered the Chico via an outlet on the east side of Lake Colhue Huapi, but heavy use of water for irrigation has lowered the lake level and led to desiccation of the Chico river. The wide valley of the Chico is mostly dry today, except during periods of especially heavy snowmelt in the Andean headwaters of the Senguerr.

== See also ==
- List of rivers of Argentina
