= Lake Colhué Huapi =

Lake in the Patagonian region, Argentina

- Lago Colhué Huapi
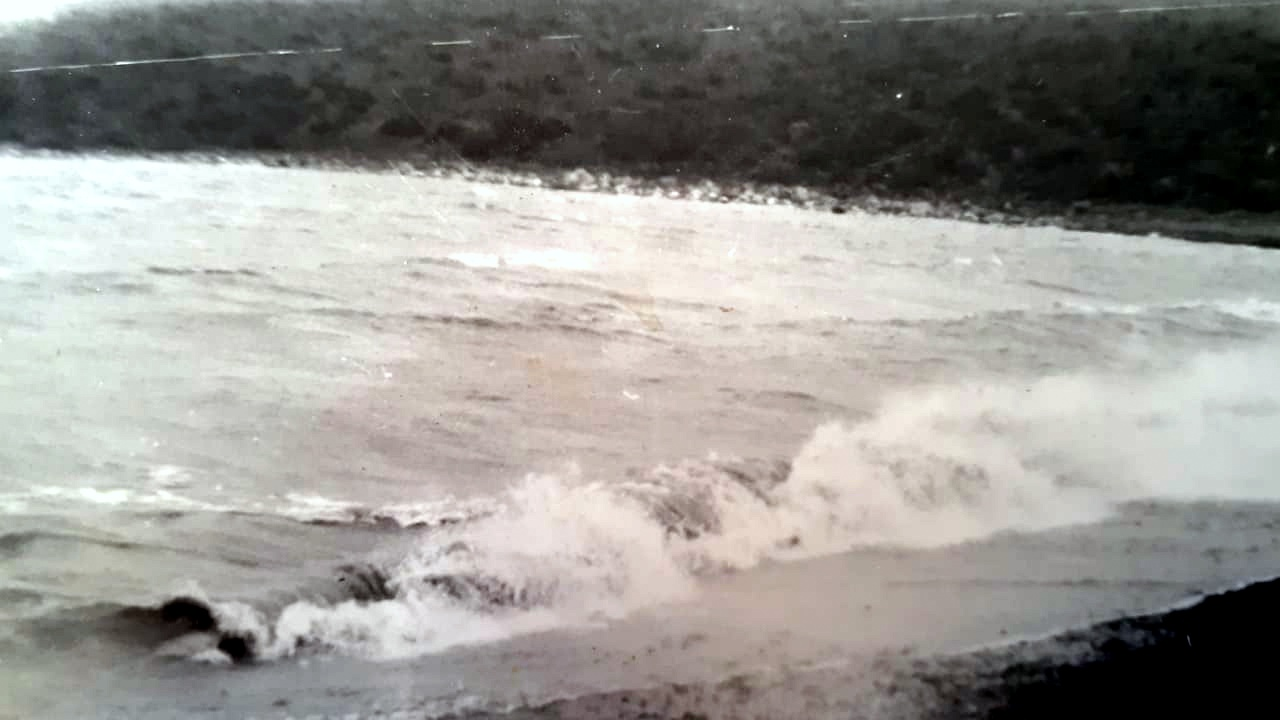
- The lake at full water in the past
- Interactive map of Lake Colhué Huapi
- Location: Valley of Sarmiento, Patagonian Andes, Argentine Patagonia, South America
- Coordinates: 45°30′S 68°45′W
- Etymology: Mapuche language: Colhué means "red or reddish place" and Huapi means "island"
- Part of: Now endorheic, exceptionally by the Chico River
- Primary inflows: Senguerr River
- Primary outflows: Chico River (Lower Chubut) (exceptional)
- Max. length: 51.2 kilometres (31.8 mi)
- Max. width: 24.8 kilometres (15.4 mi)
- Surface area: 810 square kilometres (310 mi^{2})
- Average depth: 2 metres (6.6 ft)
- Max. depth: 5.5 metres (18 ft)
- Water volume: 1,620 cubic hectometres (1,310,000 acre⋅ft)
- Shore length^{1}: 220 kilometres (140 mi)
- ^{1} Shore length is not a well-defined measure.

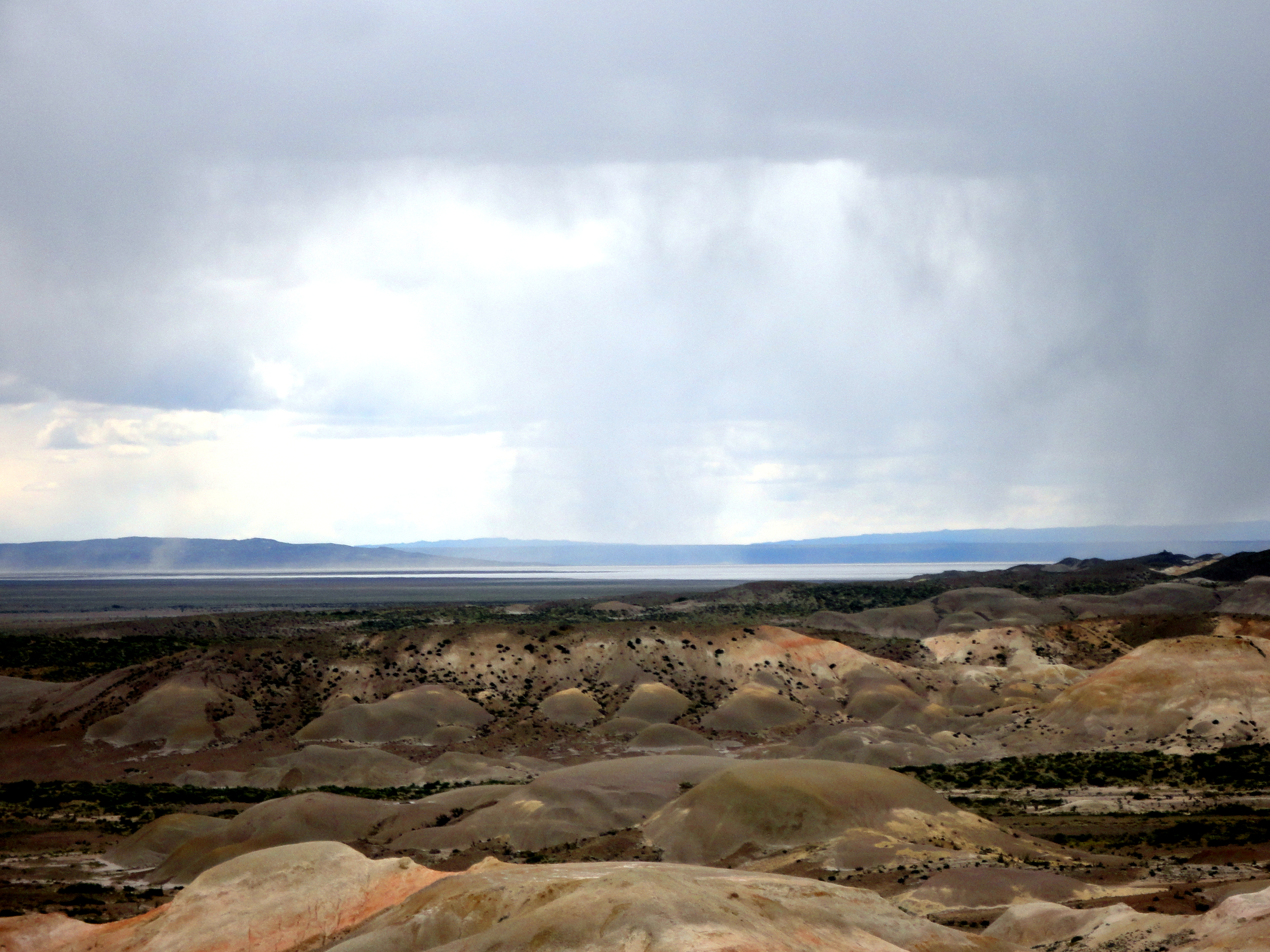
View of the lake from National Route 26, still with water in 2013. Note the advanced evaporation process of the body of water and its retreat.

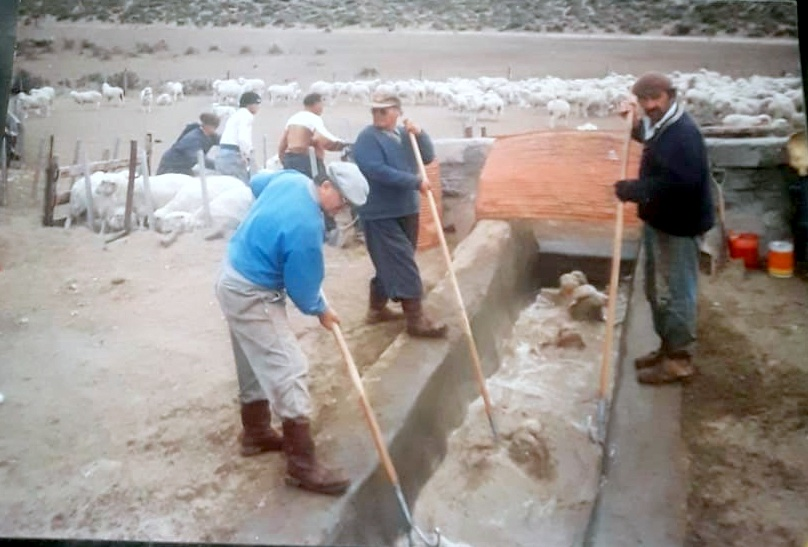
Intensive sheep farming that was exploited on the shores of the lake

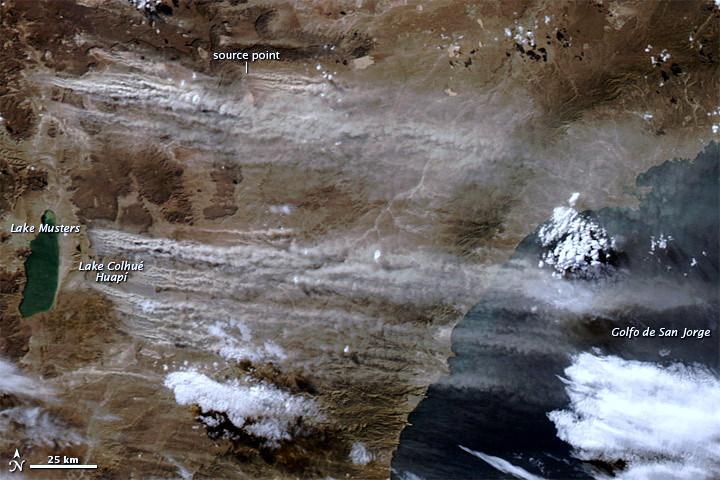
First image, captured by NASA, of the intense drought in the area in 2013. It captured the first large dust clouds.

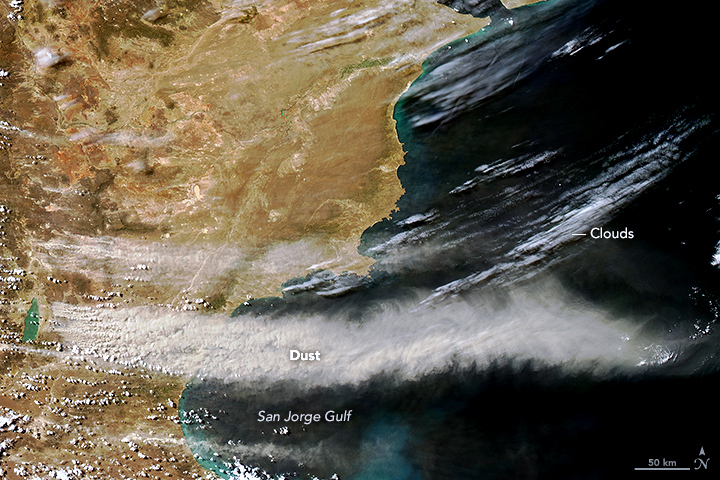
NASA image taken in 2016. It shows the great extension of the dust cloud from the lake to the Argentine Sea and the Comodoro area being hit.

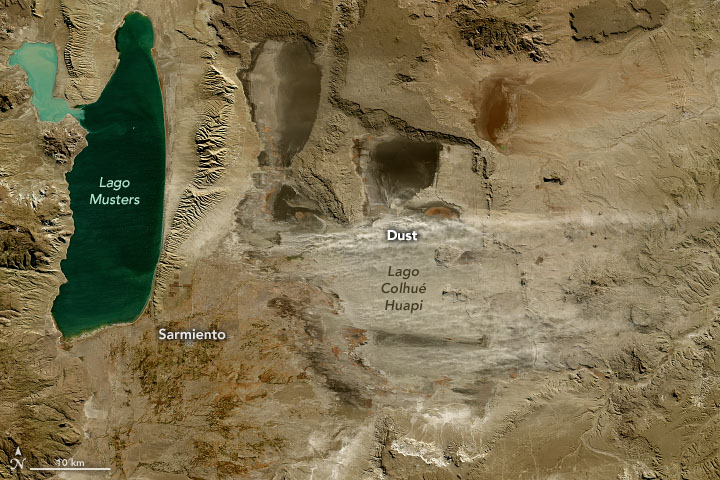
Image taken in 2021 by NASA. The Colhué Huapi completely dry and the Musters with low level and many receding shores.

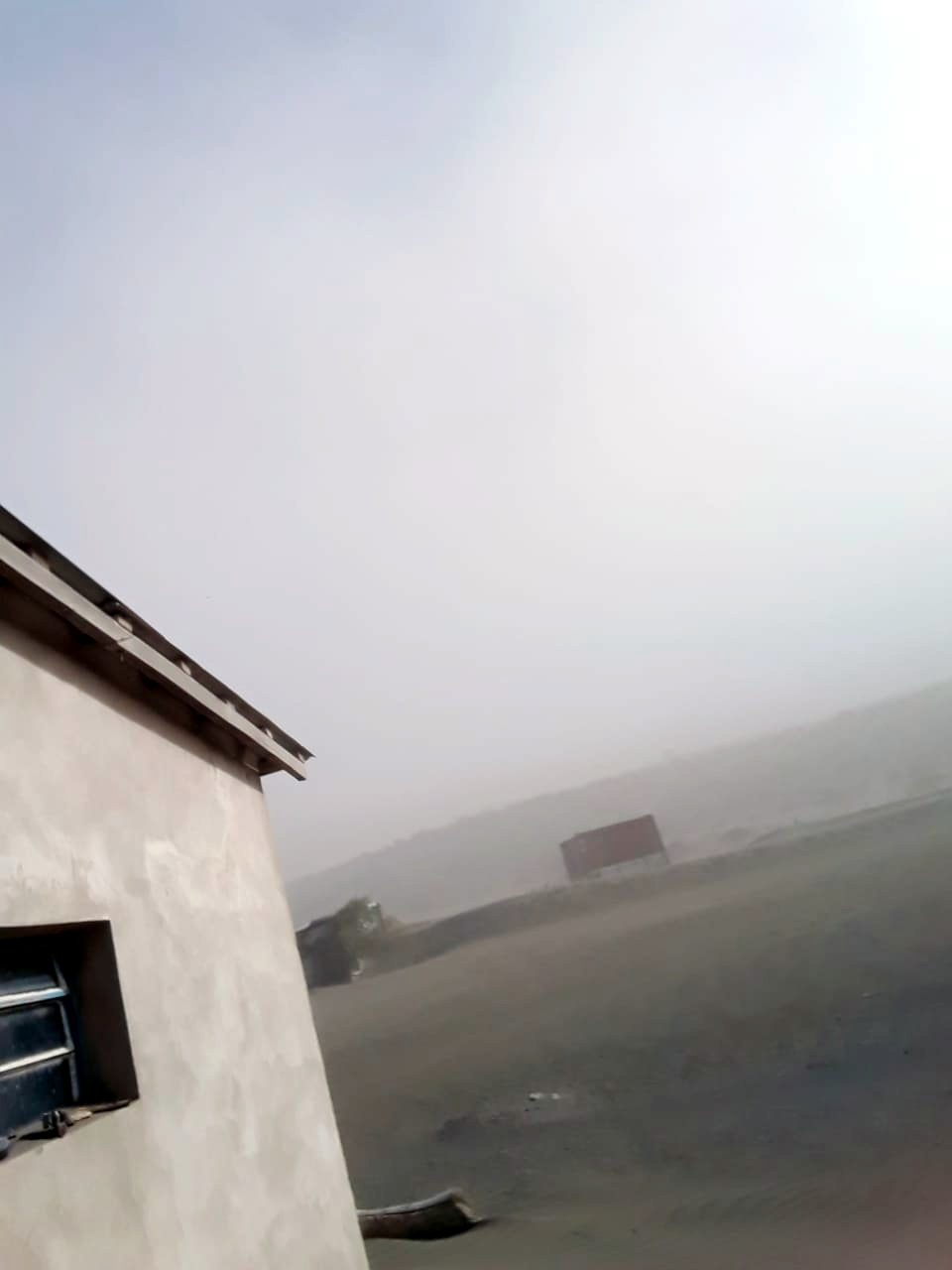
Sandstorm and wind on the lake.

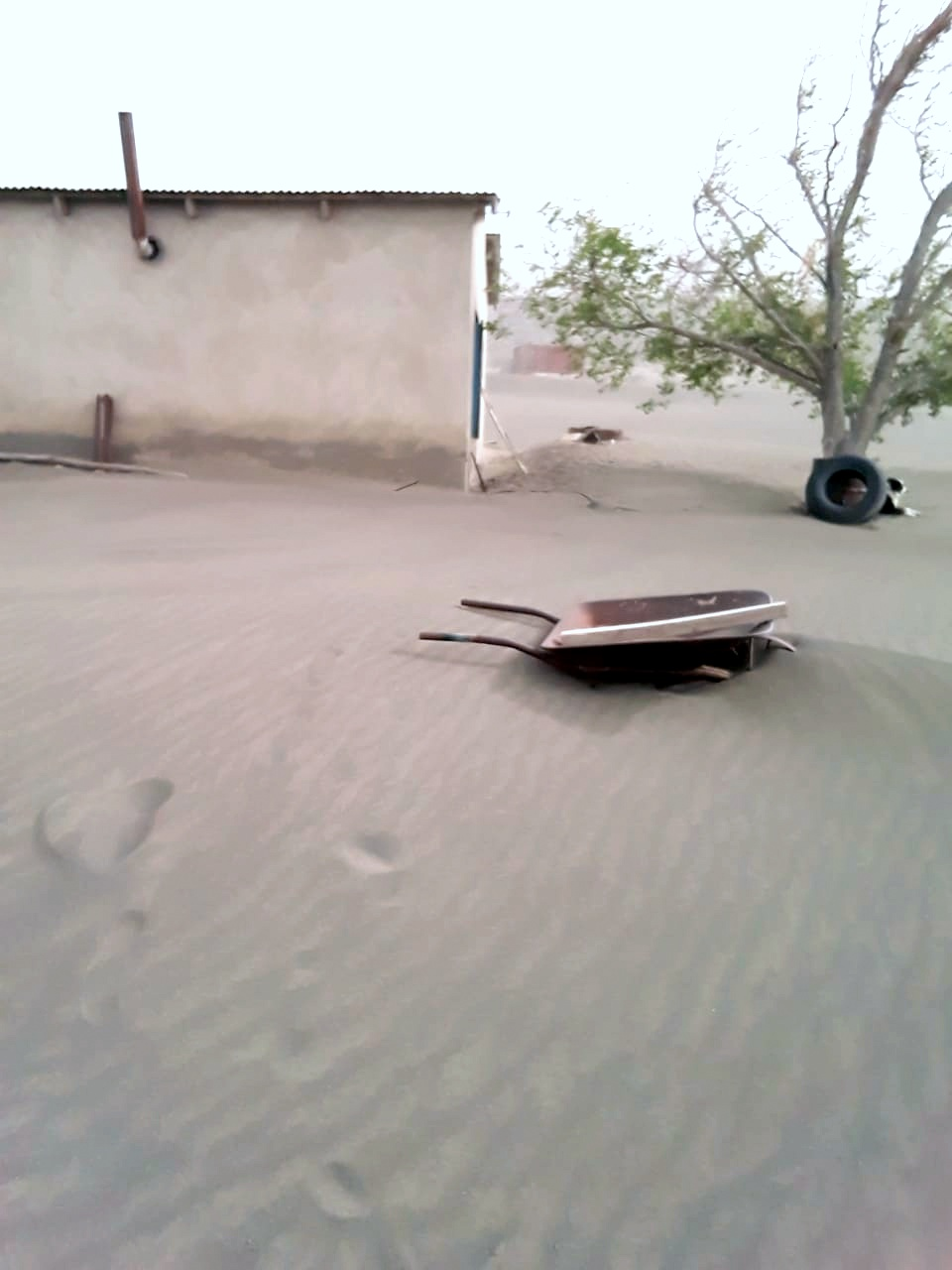
Dune originating from the silt at the bottom of the lake. They bury everything in their path.

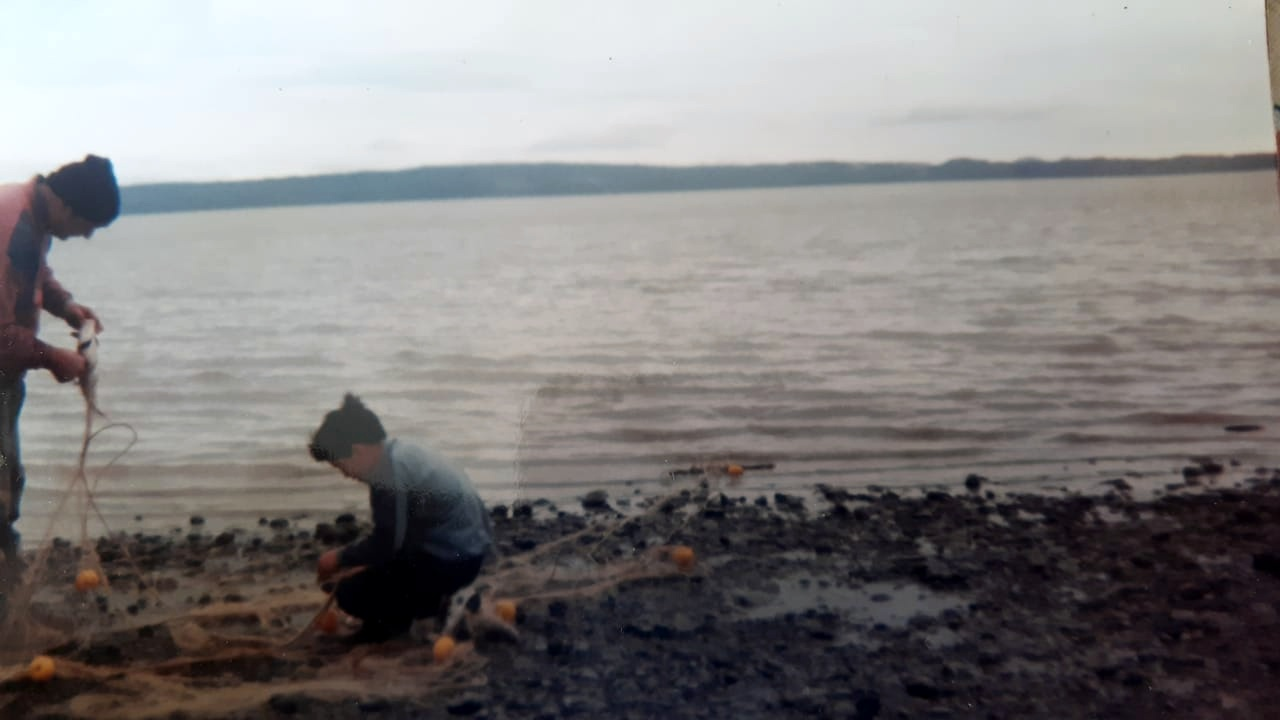
Former artisanal fishing production

Colhué Huapi is an intermittent lake located in the central Patagonian region of the Argentine Republic, south of the province of Chubut, and together with Lake Musters forms the terminal phase of the current endorheic basin of the Senguerr River. Both lakes are located in the Sarmiento Basin.

In March 2017 the lake was almost completely dry, mainly due to the artificial diversion of water from the Senguerr River and, to a lesser extent, to the drought that has been raging since 2000. It lies at an altitude of 310 m a.s.l. and the greatest width is 35 to 40 km from northwest to southeast.

Despite its large surface area when full, the lake is considered by many to be a giant lagoon because of its shallow depth. In the last 30 years the lake and the whole area around it have been experiencing a period of severe drought. This is a product of evaporation due to natural causes and undoubtedly human action was a factor that contributed to the watercourse disappearing faster. As the lake suffers the absence of liquid due to the great droughts, it leaves its bottom uncovered; then the winds form dunes that further erode the environment. As a major consequence this wind lashes the entire surrounding rural area and distant points such as the metropolitan area of Comodoro Rivadavia on the Argentine Sea.

The lake remains dry most of the year, with the exception of the few wetter months, which together with improvements in water abstraction policies means that the Falso Senguer drains part of its flow into the lake. This causes the fields near the lake to see a small lake intermittently until the summer season.

== Toponymy ==
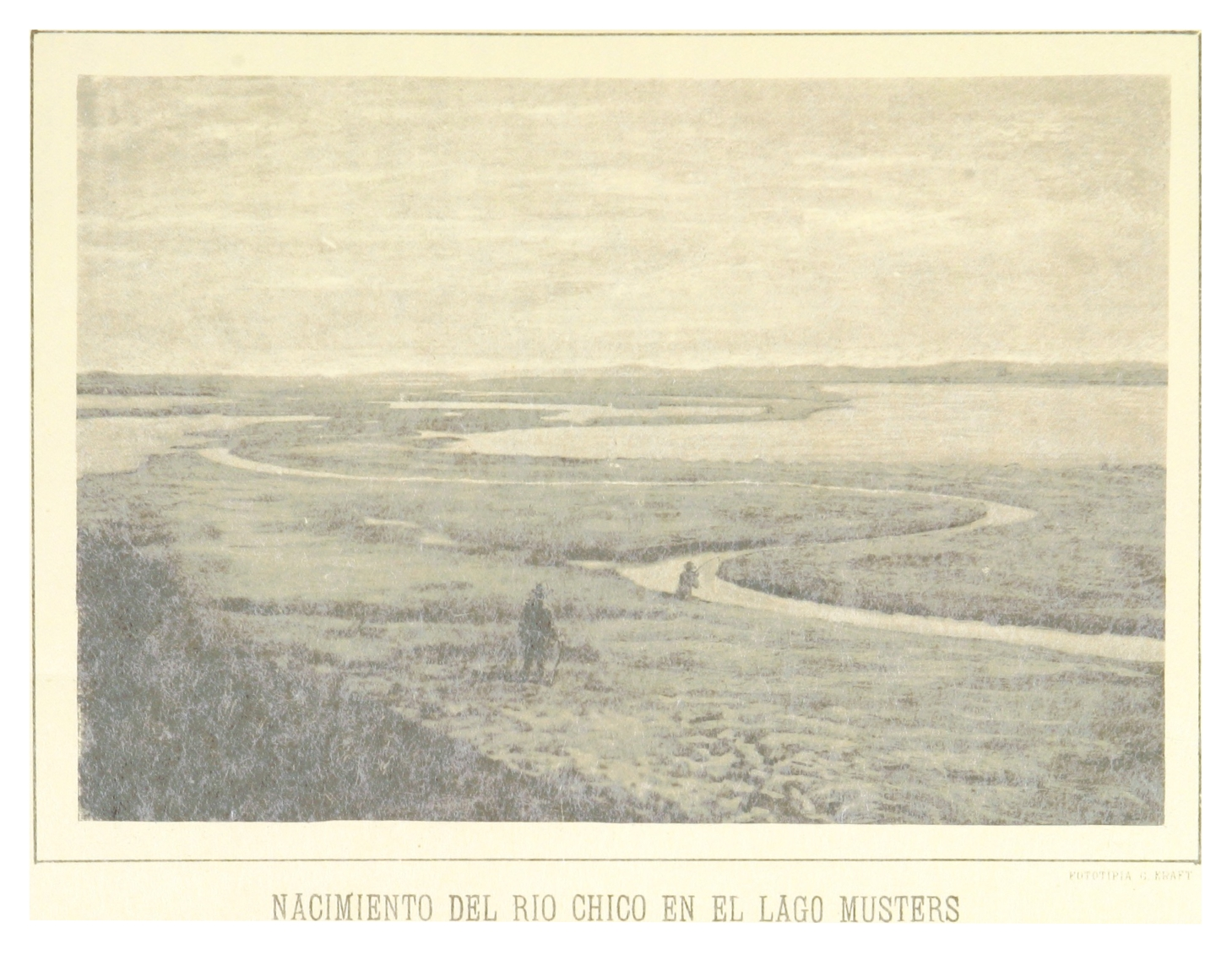
The headwaters of the Chico River next to the Colhué Huapi, captured by Luis Jorge Fontana in the expedition of the Riflemen of Chubut in 1886.

The name of this great water mirror comes from the Mapuche language (Mapudungun). The word Colhué means "red or reddish place". On the other hand, Huapi refers to "island". Thus, it can be assumed that the ancient inhabitants of the region called this lake this way in allusion to one of its rocky islands, or because of the clay colour of the water. It may also be a Mapuche expression meaning lake of the brown island. The same name was given to a nearby oil field and to an old Comodoro Rivadavia Railway station near the lake, which served the homonymous spot.

== Geography ==
The lake used to be an orchard in the middle of the deserted Patagonian Steppe. The San Bernardo mountain range separates it from the neighbouring Lake Musters and the entire area around it is riddled with hills of low and high altitudes. The landscapes surrounding the lake are also accompanied by ancient extinct volcanoes.

The lake is criss-crossed by several peninsulas and headlands. However, the most prominent is the Grande or Namuncurá peninsula. This peninsula divides the northern part of Colhué Huapi in two. It runs in a straight line from north to south for about 20 kilometres and rises 500 metres above sea level at its highest point and is the most prominent coastal feature in sight from all sides. In terms of size, the Grande peninsula, seen from a distance from the lake shores, appears to be very high and rocky at the top. However, it consists of a superposition of sand and clay hills no more than 300 metres high in relation to the lake. At its southern end it decreases in height until it culminates in coarse sandy beaches, on which there is a scattering of medium-sized rocks, polished by the earthy wind.

Other highlights on the shores of the lake are the Chica peninsula and the Mocha peninsula with its high stone cliffs.

The lake used to have many islands, now reduced to sandy, wind-worn hills and two large, flat-roofed cliff islands. Today some of them still have vegetation.

The extensive drought has now caused the ruin of all the surrounding estancias, as well as the accumulation of extensive sand dunes that are spread over large distances for kilometres. The size of the sand dunes resulted in the creation of a Sahara-like desert with mounds of sand similar in size and shape to pyramids. The dunes have sand that was at the bottom of the lake as sediment and are moved with every wind, burying everything in their path.

== Palaeontology ==
Both the river and lake areas are important dinosaur sites with dinosaur specimens found and dinosaur egg remains. The area includes Cretaceous rocks, about 70 million years old, and a large number of hadrosaur remains.

== History ==
Ten thousand years ago, the Colhué Huapi and the neighbouring lake Musters formed a single lake. As a result, today's Mocha and Chica peninsulas were large islands. The ancient body of water was called Paleolake Sarmiento and its elevation reached over 326 m.a.s.l. (60 metres above the present level of Lake Musters). Subsequently, it declined and it is estimated that before 1600 BC the lakes were still connected and the bottom of the lower Sarmiento was almost entirely occupied by water. By 1500 BC the lakes would have reached a level similar to the present day and separated.

It is believed that the arid conditions that persist today, with certain variables, have been maintained from the last 5,000 - 6,000 years to the present.

The lake area was inhabited by aborigines throughout time. Because of this continuous presence, there are material records of hunter-gatherer peoples. Their presence was recorded in chenques (tombs), rock art and elements of their daily life. The lake enjoyed human preference over neighbouring Lake Musters, as evidenced by the large number and variety of archaeological features and indigenous burial sites that have been found there for decades. Recent studies have verified that hunter-gatherer groups practised intensive and continuous fishing since 1500 years ago.

It was the Tehuelches who gathered the oldest accounts of the lake. They claimed that its waters were inhabited by a monster known as lemisch (Yemis-che). The translation is water tiger. For the Indians it was a supernatural being of which they were superstitiously terrified, because of its ferocious appearance, its nocturnal habits, its strength and bellowing, and its complete invulnerability to remington shots. Carlos Ameghino, who was travelling through Chubut and Patagonia in search of fossil bones for his brother Florentino, mentioned to the latter in a letter that he had obtained from the Tehuelche Indians, some precious data about the famous lemisch. The scientist affirmed its veracity since he had seen in the possession of an Indian, a piece of lemisch leather, in which the small bones are embedded. These were sent to Florentino Ameghino and were found to resemble fossilised pieces of Mylodon remains. Until the 20th century, before the great droughts that left the lake empty, tales of the monster were still heard.

The lake was explored by the Rifleros del Chubut in 1886.

Western civilisation occupied the margins of the lake in the late 19th and early 20th centuries. Thus, the colonists settled where other past civilisations had previously developed. The children of the peoples of the past, still present at that time, within a few decades were incorporated into the western way of life. The old way of life became extinct within a few years.

In a report written by the German explorer Wilhelm Vallentin, during his tour of the region in 1904 and 1905. He described it as a lake about 50 kilometres long and just over 20 kilometres wide. It had been completely dry in former times.

In an essay on Sarmiento's colony in the 1968 Cuadernos de Historia del Chubut he states:

"This lake presented an unknown, because of which it was always surrounded by mystery. What happened to its waters? Did they infiltrate? [...] as soon as the flows of the Senguer diminished, in Lake Colhué Huapi its great downpours began again, leaving enormous sandbanks uncovered".

In 1914, the Colhué Huapi station was established only 20 km from the lake. It promoted an agricultural settlement that used the waters of the river that feeds the lake. With the closure of the Comodoro Rivadavia to Colonia Sarmiento Railway in 1977, the village declined rapidly. However, even today it is still a place with agricultural production.

At the end of the first half of the 20th century, the lake was already suffering from recurrent low water levels. However, it never dried up completely. When the lake recovered, it grew to such an extent that in parts it covered the old route to Sarmiento. To combat the frequent floods, the inhabitants of the farms dug wells close to the shore.

Even in the 1950s, the river that carried its waters to the Chubut River was still flowing and had its last activity. Moreover, by that time the whole area adjacent to the lake had abundant water, farms, fruit trees, trees, plantations, it was a very green place, a place with a lot of vegetation. The 1950s are fundamental for the comparisons of the different levels of the lake over time. The Topographic charts from the 1950s and satellite photos from the early 2000s reveal the change in elevation and the successive recession of the lake. In those years, the Mocha peninsula was connected to the mainland by a narrow strip of land. Then, as the water receded, the plain became a lagoon linked to the lake by a channel, before finally becoming an independent lagoon that eventually mutated into the parched plain that we walk across.

By the 1960s the area adjacent to the lake had a large amount of sheep production with productive fields. The production was such that the estancia was able to produce cheese for sale in the now extinct Parada km 162, a former railway station town located in the southeast of the Sarmiento valley.

The Colhué in the 1970s was a great place for sport fishing and also for commercial fishing, the fishermen who sold in the village took their livelihood from the Colhué. The lake gradually lost its commercial fishing, which used boats. The economic activity originated by fishing became important despite the fact that it was carried out in a swampy body of water, with murky, shallow waters, which froze during the winter and suffered great drops. The reasons for the success of the fishing activity were due to the fact that the lake was navigable most of the year with simple boats, as it was not very dangerous due to its shallowness. This meant that during windstorms, the lake did not generate the strong swell of its neighbouring Musters, which, despite its smaller size, is deeper. Another factor in the success of the fishery is explained by scientific studies that analysed the silt and zooplankton in the lake in the 1980s. The findings led to it being labelled as an oasis of productivity around an arid territory. Being shallow (an average of two metres during the studies), the wind caused the soil to be stirred up, so the water had more nutrients, which in turn generated a large amount of zooplankton of a significant size (among the largest of the Argentinean lakes). This contributed to the abundance of food for perch and silversides, which in turn prevented them from preying on each other.

In the 1990s the lake could be seen to be moving further and further away. When the drought hit in the 2000s, the nearby ranches were gradually covered with sand from the lake, depopulating the area. Fishing, which had flourished in the 1970s, continued towards the end of the 1990s with exports to other cities in the region. It ceased to be received because the fish tasted muddy due to the continuous lowering of the lake. Thus, the modern fishing that began among the settlers shortly after arriving and settling on its banks and nearby came to an end. However, it left numerous traces of its activity all along the shore: boats, old moorings, settlements and some houses. The last fishing activities were carried out in the year 2000 during a great low water. Today, many of its fishermen have moved to the neighbouring lake.

In May 2016, a ranch hand discovered a light aircraft that had crashed in 1964 in a swamp at the bottom of the lake, which was dry. The aircraft was carrying four passengers, had departed from Comodoro Rivadavia and crashed into Lake Colhué Huapi, killing all the crew. Although the bodies were quickly found, the aircraft had never been recovered.

Despite having no aboriginal presence for a long time, even in recent years the shores of the lake still provide archaeological remains of the tribes that inhabited the area. Nowadays, the prolonged drought has ruined all the production in the area and closed many of the estancias and boliches that catered to travellers along the route that runs along part of the lake shore. The route forks in two: to the west towards the towns of Buen Pasto and Paso de Indios, and the other towards Chico River and Comodoro Rivadavia.

== Hydrological considerations ==
Lake Colhué Huapi occupied a shallow depression, presumably originated by wind deflation in an area occupied predominantly by fine clays. Its only indirect tributary is the Senguerr River, which is fed by Andean meltwater regulated at its headwaters by the Fontana and La Plata lakes. After travelling 350 km from these mountain slopes through the central plateau of the province of Chubut, this river brings an average annual flow of 54 m^{3}/s to the entire lower Sarmiento basin.

Upon entering this alluvial and eolian plain, the Senguerr subdivides into numerous secondary branches (generally dry) in the form of a fan that runs northeastward. Its main channel flows towards the tectonic trench of Lake Musters, entering it on its southern shore, and, shortly before reaching it, it splits again to also contribute to Lake Colhué Huapi, located a few kilometres to the east.

This branch of the river that connects both lakes has been called "Falso Senguerr", and its meandering course passes to the north of the town of Sarmiento (Chubut). The southernmost branch of the Senguerr River is the Cerro Negro ditch. It also forms meanders and lagoons, but reaches Lake Colhué Huapi only during extraordinary floods. Thus in the past the Colhué Huapi was fed by the Senguer in three sections. The first and best known is the Falso Senguer branch, which today is named as the only tributary of the lake. However, maps from the late 19th and early 20th centuries clearly show the channels of the Zanjón del Cerro Negro and a kind of delta that drained into the central western shore of the Colhué Huapi, which was obstructed by National Route 26. According to satellite images, the Zanjón del Cerro Negro loses most of its water between kilometres 6 and 23 of its course. Thus, it does not usually drain into the lake despite being 40 kilometres long. It is commonly diverted to irrigate farms in the south of the Sarmiento valley. This, together with the fact that the asphalt road blocked an old delta that drained into the centre of the Colhué Huapi, contributed to the drying up of the lake.

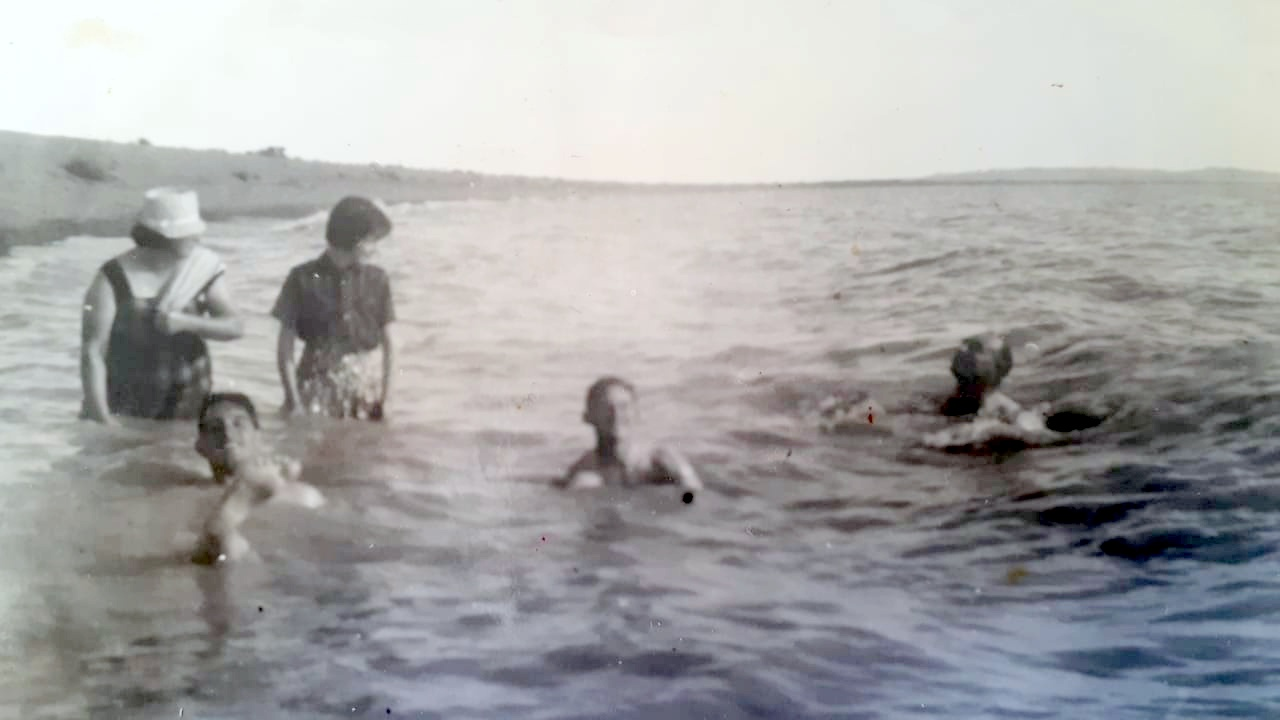
Family visiting a beach on the lake

Lake Colhué Huapi has extensive shoreline mudflats, mainly along the entire range of channels and inlets provided by the Falso Senguerr River. It is separated from Lake Musters by an isthmus of land about 12 km wide and 695 m above sea level.

Although these two great lakes of the Patagonian plateau present notorious geo-hydrological differences between them, it is inevitable to study them together, since they are part of the same chained water system.

While the Musters is of tectonic origin and has an average depth of 20m, Lake Colhué Huapi is very shallow (2m average), has a very high turbidity in its waters due to a high concentration of suspended sediments, mainly due to wind action, and can be considered an argylotrophic lake due to its level of nutrients and inorganic sediments.

In the past, the entire Senguerr basin had a natural and intermittent drainage towards the Atlantic slope, as the excessive floods and flows towards the Colhué Huapi reached the mouth of the Chico river, whose headwaters are located at the south-eastern end of the flood zone of this lake. Thus, through the long course of the Chico River to the northeast, the discharge occasionally reached its mouth at the Chubut River. This intermittent natural regulating process occurred for the last time in 1939, and since then the Chico River has been a large watercourse practically dry along most of its course.

== Fish fauna ==
In spite of the extreme turbidity of its waters, the Colhué Huapi has an abundant aquatic fauna composed mainly of perch (Percichthys trucha) and Patagonian silverside (Odontesthes microlepidotus). Likewise, this unique environment is of special interest from the point of view of biodiversity conservation, due to the presence of three autochthonous species of fish, the first two in danger of extinction: the toad catfish (Diplomystres viedmensis mesembrinus), the puyén (Galaxias platei), and the large-mouthed perch (Percichthys colhuehuapensis).

In addition, its coasts were once covered with thick reed beds that were home to otters and a very diverse fauna.

== Environmental situation ==
=== Drought ===
The lake was in good health with almost its entire surface covered by water from 2004 to 2010. A scientific study by S. Gasso and O. Torres found a series of periods of dust storm activity lasting approximately 2 to 10 years each, with the most dusty years being 1970-1976, 1989-1994, 1996-1997 and 1999-2017.

In 2002 the lake farms were active and the lake had not yet completely disappeared. In the area there were several rural boliche alleys, which no longer exist. When the lake was in full flow, its waters could flood the provincial route 24. The image of the lake was gloomy with dark waters and several islets a short distance from the shore.

Due to its large surface area and shallow depth, Lake Colhué Huapi is naturally subject to a severe evaporation process, both by wind and solar radiation. In addition, and as a result of several human interventions in this basin, intake works have been carried out to feed drinking water aqueducts from Lake Musters, and irrigation canalisations and the transfer of large volumes of water from the Senguerr River to the secondary phase exploitation of the numerous oil wells in the region. All this aggravated the already compromised hydrological balance of the system to the limits of quasi-collapse in the Colhué Huapi, in which there is an increasing decrease of its historical levels, and an accelerated process of retraction and drying up in its periphery. The water balance of the entire basin has been negative for the last seventy years. The current situation could be defined as highly compromised, and constitutes the main environmental threat to maintain the precarious hydro-biological balance of the system.

In 2003, the lake showed its last remnants of water 10 kilometres south of the Jerez boliche.

The lake began its slow drought since the Falso Senguerr, its main source of nourishment, was severely touched by human hand in recent years, despite its important role as a supplier of water to the Colhué Huapi. An INTA report issued in 2016 indicated that the largest area covered by water in the Colhué Huapi was in 2006 with almost 77,000 hectares. By 2015 it had lost 70% of that area. The situation worsened since 2006 as a work was built to prevent the Senguerr River from flowing into the Falso Senguerr, forcing it to contribute almost all of its flow to Lake Musters and feed the Falso Senguerr with ecological flows to keep it active. In late 2013 a project was announced to regulate the source of the Falso Senguerr in order to keep Lake Musters at its maximum reserve level.

With much of the lake dry in 2011 the wind swept across the lake bed and formed dunes up to 14 m^{2} high that move towards the shore and affect all coastal populations on windy days from Camarones to Caleta Olivia in the south. The populations in this strip are covered on windy days in an apparent sort of mist, but this is actually what the wind erupts from the lake bed. As a result, the population suffers constantly from allergy, respiratory and eye problems.

Since 12 May 2013, the intense clouds of dust that rise from the lake, pass through the agglomeration of Comodoro Rivadavia and culminate in the San Jorge Gulf have attracted the attention of NASA. In the meantime, by means of its Aqua satellite, a dying lake was captured almost dry. In its analysis, the space agency described the Colhué as a very shallow lake to the point of disappearing into a beige and brown landscape. Finally, a series of data was provided, such as the increase in dust deposition on the Antarctic Peninsula correlated with the introduction of sheep to Patagonia around 1935 and the nutritional benefit of dust to marine waters.

In 2016 it dried up completely thanks to basin drought and overuse for irrigation (that of the Senguer River and its tributaries). The problem became nationally known, due to the discovery of a missing plane in the dry riverbed in 1964. In the same period its two tributaries were dry: the Falso Senguer and the Zanjón del Cerro Negro (which is an arm of the Senguer and drains into the southern shore of the lake). Faced with this situation, Alfredo H. Luenzo, then national senator, made a draft declaration. He presented data to warn of the dramatic situation. It was reported that in 1996 the extension of the lake was 55,312 hectares. In 2016 it only reached 21,431, according to a report prepared by the Environmental Management Group of the INTA Experimental Station, Chubut headquarters. The senator explained that the water deficit is partly due to natural characteristics that cause the evaporation process by wind action or solar radiation. In addition, there is a shortage of rainfall and environmental humidity. However, he called for recognition of the serious impact of anthropic actions on these freshwater mirrors, damaging the ecological balance of the area. It is necessary to recognise human responsibility and be aware of the negative consequences of the irrational use of water, contributing to the fact that the conditions of the lakes are becoming increasingly extreme, putting at risk the survival of the different species of native flora and fauna, threatening not only the regional economies, but also the health and quality of life of their inhabitants.

On 3 November 2016, NASA's Aqua satellite again captured the vast cloud of dust that Colhué releases into the Atlantic. According to the scientific body, the abundance of fine sediments was large enough to be recorded by satellites.

By 2017 the lake had completely disappeared. That year the situation showed that in only three months it had disappeared, after months before it had maintained 30% of its water volume. By the middle of that year a flood revived it for a while. This climatic phenomenon was unprecedented and was not recorded in any record. Thanks to this, the Lake Musters recovered the level that had dropped by 1.45 m and the Chico River flowed again to reach the Chubut at the Ameghino dam.

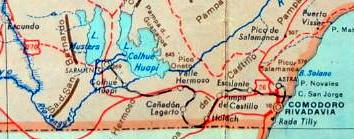
Map of the points that maintained relevant population in 1962. It also provides a historical image showing the railway line crossed by several branches of the Senguer River that discharged into the Colhué Huapi.

In recent years, with the authorisation of the Provincial Water Institute of the Province of Chubut (IPA), the waters of the Senguerr River were almost completely diverted by means of clandestine embankments to irrigate fruit crops. This caused the watercourse to dry up: the embankments took almost all the flow, and hardly any water reached the Colhué Huapi. At the beginning of 2017, a group of self-organised neighbours complained about the environmental deterioration to the IPA, which refused to recognise the seriousness of the problem. According to the neighbours of Sarmiento, the main reason for the drought of the Senguerr River and Lake Colhué Huapi is the diversion made by a fruit production establishment for export belonging to the Bulgheroni family (known for its majority stake in the company Bridas and for controlling, together with British Petroleum, the oil company Pan American Energy (PAE), the main oil company in Chubut). By March 2017, the IPA decided not to fine or take action against anyone, and even refused to verify the existence of the illegal embankments. Faced with the prospect of the imminent disappearance of the lake, the residents of Sarmiento, alarmed by the falling water level, gathered in marches and demanded measures. Political inaction led the protesters to camp in front of the IPA and to dismantle part of the illegal embankments that divert the flow of the river themselves.

Since 2017, the Colhué Huapi has been slowly drying up again, and by December 2019 it had 20% of its original surface area left.

By 2020, a vast cloud of dust plaguing the region was photographed by an astronaut as the International Space Station passed over South America. NASA described such weather events in this region as surprising and common. It also revealed that the dust storm moved its dust more than 120 kilometres east over land and eventually into the Atlantic Ocean. Finally, he compared it to the dust scattered over the surface that is also observed on Mars.

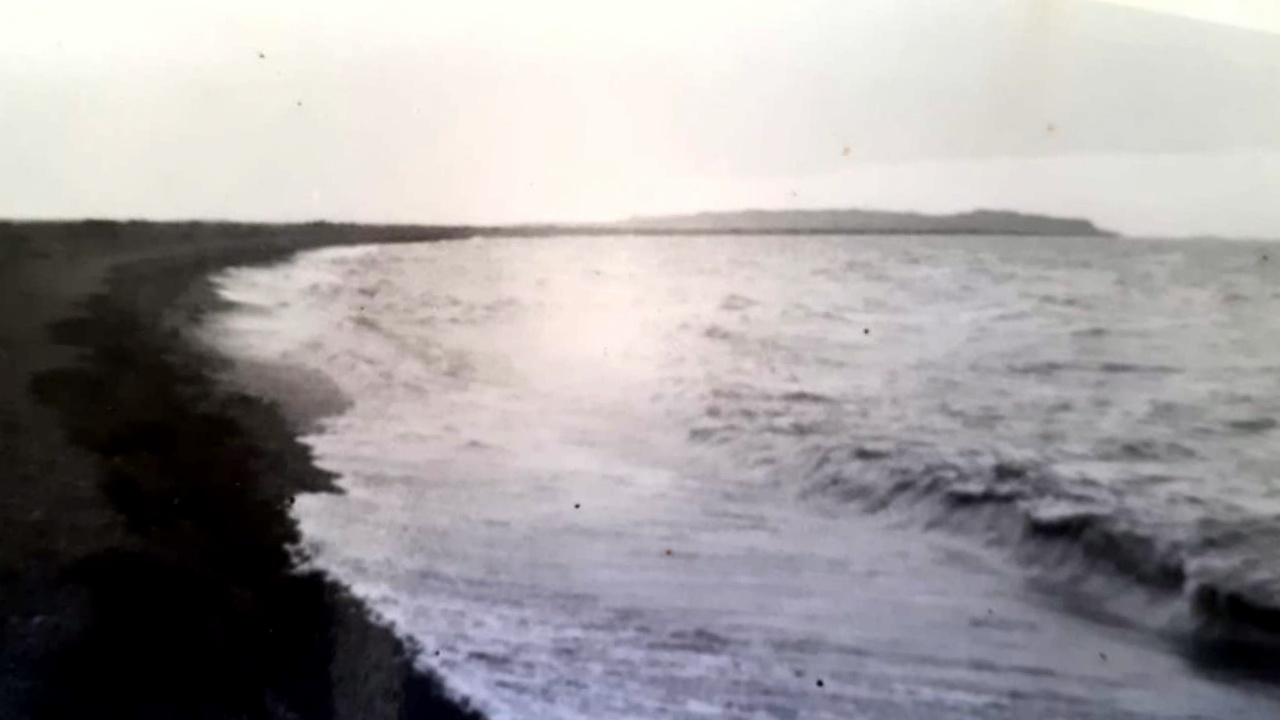
Large size of the lake. An intense swell can be seen with a view towards a peninsula.

Again, in 2021 NASA with its Landsat 8 satellite took a new image. While cataloguing the dry lake as: "the largest and most active source of dust storms in the region". Dust storms are caused by strong northwesterly winds that routinely blow across the eastern side of the Andes Mountains and whip across the central Patagonian desert. In the process, they stir up abundant sediment from Lake Colhué Huapi. NASA claimed through its studies that the winds can carry dust from Colhué Huapi as far east as Antarctica, where it could have consequences for the speed at which snow and ice melt. In addition, the claim that the sediment is beneficial to phytoplankton was continued, and the intensity of the phenomenon in the region prompted studies based on satellite and surface meteorological data from the last five decades. These state that dust storms peak during the summer (December to March), although winter events (May to August) are also common. Most years have brought 15 to 30 moderate to large events. Also, there has been a steady increase in the number of dusty days observed since the 1970s.

Currently the erosion of the terrain is of great magnitude, and the terrain is being reshaped with every major windstorm that hits the area on a regular basis. Strong storms blow dust up to 120 kilometres to the northeast and then blow it out over the Gulf of San Jorge and into the Atlantic Ocean. As with Saharan sand blown into the Caribbean Sea, dust from such storms is an important source of nutrients in the adjacent ocean. Today the lake area is reminiscent of the Sahara with immense dunes making their way to the sea.

By 2022, access to the east coast is described as a challenge, because according to reports from other travellers, dune fields were stretched out in the vicinity and the roads were destroyed by water-logged ditches. At the source of the Chico River the dwellings are besieged by dangerously restless and damaging dunes. The entire area around the lake is hostile to life, devoid of water and constantly beset by sandstorms. As a result of the receding water and the general effect of drought around the lake today, traces of the aboriginal inhabitants' use of the natural resources of the lake and its surroundings abound. Virtually the entire eastern shore is scourged by the wind that whips up vast clouds of dust. The accumulation with each storm causes the sediment to build up and end up forming large dunes that sweep away the homes of the ranchers. This situation started in 2006 and continued until 2017 when heavy rains filled the lake again. However, after a short time the lake and the river dried up again; large dunes formed again, damaging the few inhabitants who still live on the shores of the river and to the east of the lake. They are forced to abandon their homes because of the unstoppable advance of the 7-metre high dunes that engulf their houses.

Also, in the same year, Civil Defence warned that the lack of water in Lake Colhué Huapi causes the flying dust to be dangerous to health. It is composed of silica, a material used in the manufacture of glass. When it comes into contact with the eyes it causes damage to the eyes, and when breathed in it causes damage to the lungs. This phenomenon is similar to the problem of flying volcanic ash. As it is a very fine sand, like volcanic ash, it is advisable to wear a mask and goggles to protect the eyes and respiratory system from damage. The result of prolonged exposure is that because it contains so much silica, it is like breathing in glass.

In December 2022, the satellite's satellite imagery showed only sandbanks and sediment with a completely dry lake.

In January 2023 it was learned that the Minister of Hydrocarbons, Martin Cerdá, stated that the provincial government was working on a tender for the area comprising the missing lake. The area began to be studied in 2012 in an exploratory project initiated by the companies Petrominera Chubut and Petroquímica Comodoro Rivadavia, with an investment at that time in the order of 70 million dollars. The results were 12 punctures at different depths, ranging from 200 metres to 700 metres. They yielded methane-type gas and the presence of a "26 API" oil grade. These lasted until 2016 when they were shut down due to difficulties encountered by the company. However, it is a very marginal field lacking infrastructure; there is nowhere to extract production. Given the area's difficulties, the tender would have an incentive of lower royalties or other alternatives.

The news of the imminent oil exploitation of Colhué brought unrest among Sarmiento's neighbours. Thus, a movement of Autoconvocados por el Agua was organised. The movement held a public meeting in Sarmiento's San Martín square, awareness-raising actions, and other protest activities, such as a music festival planned for early February. However, the main fear of many neighbours is that the eventual activity will also have a negative impact on the drought process that the neighbouring Lake Musters is also suffering. By the end of January, Chubut's Minister of Hydrocarbons assured that the deposit is 60 kilometres from the lake and that confusion was generated by the name of the area. He also confirmed that activities near the lake had been ruled out.

== Gallery ==
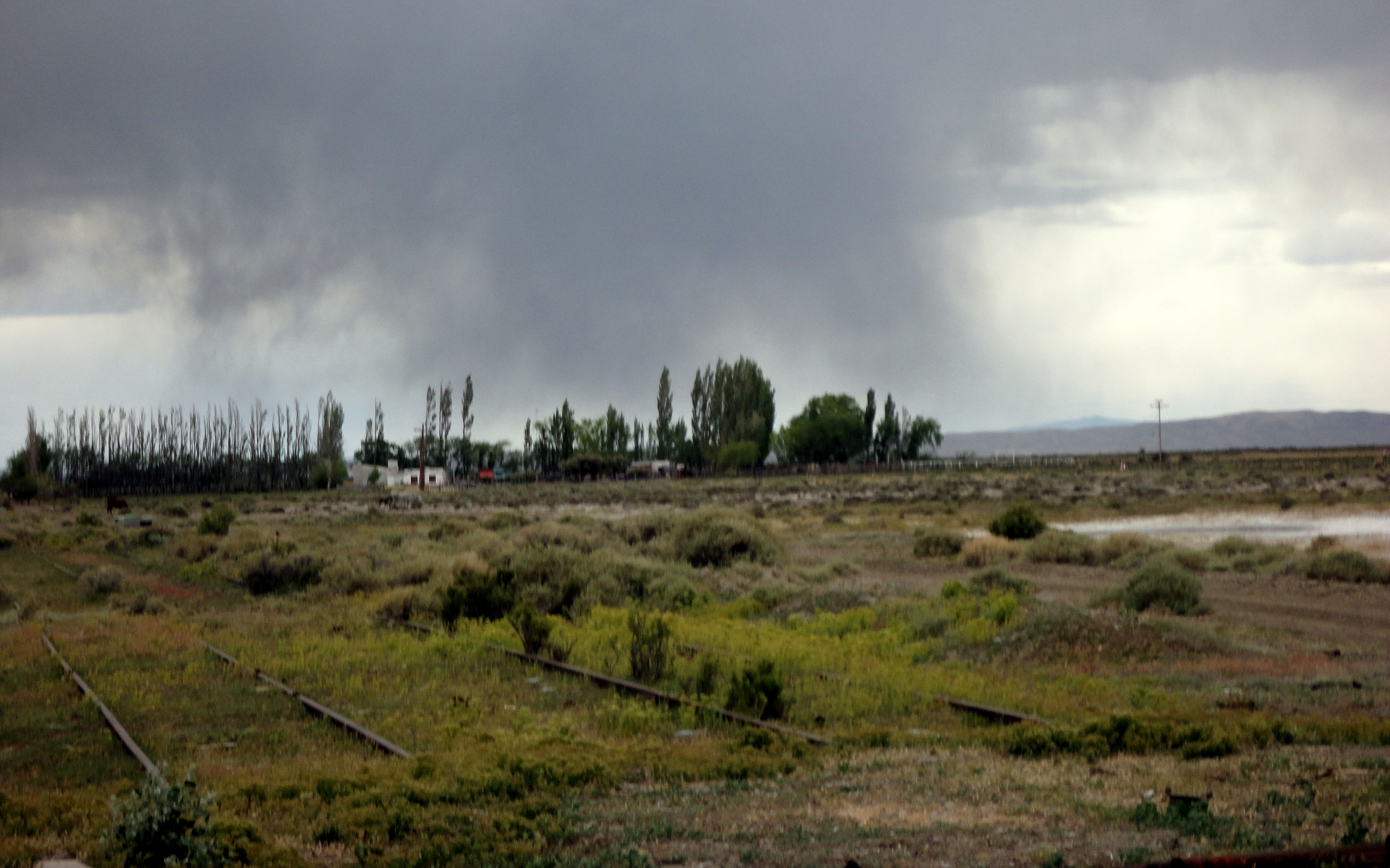
The Colhué Huapi area near the lake and the town of Sarmiento.

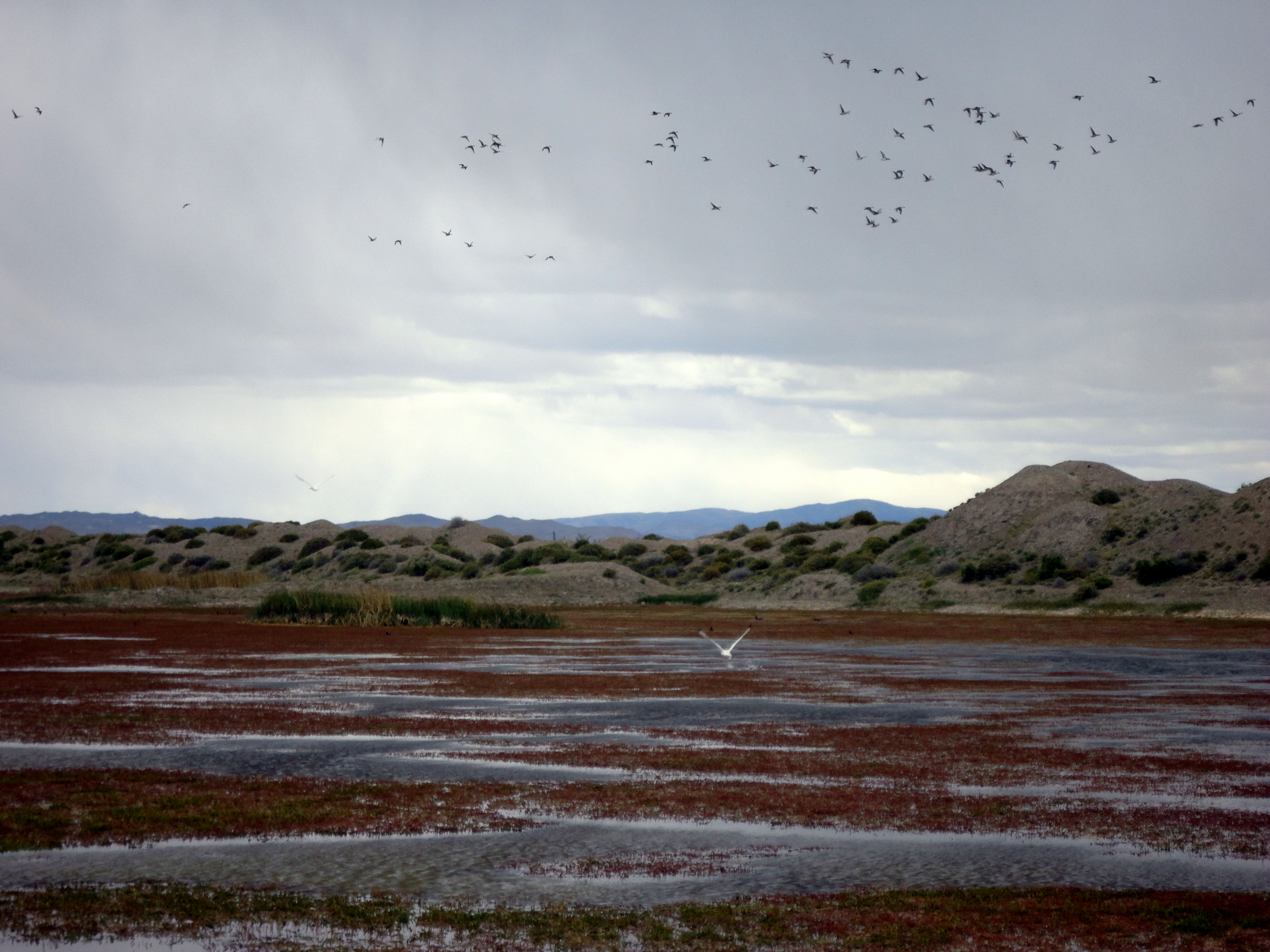
Fauna near the town of Colhué Huapi in the vicinity of the lake.

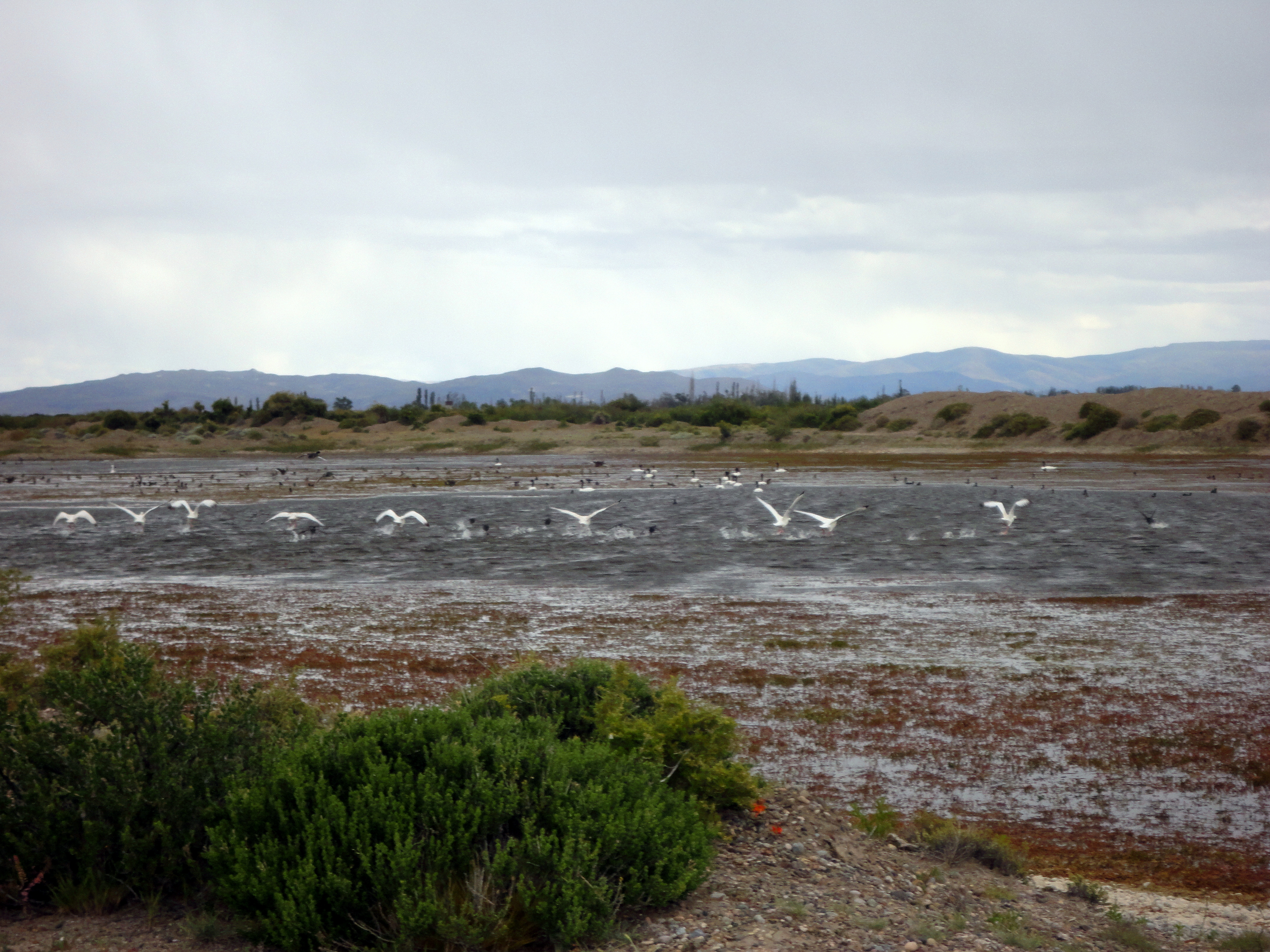
Natural environment surrounding the town of Colhué Huapi near the lake.

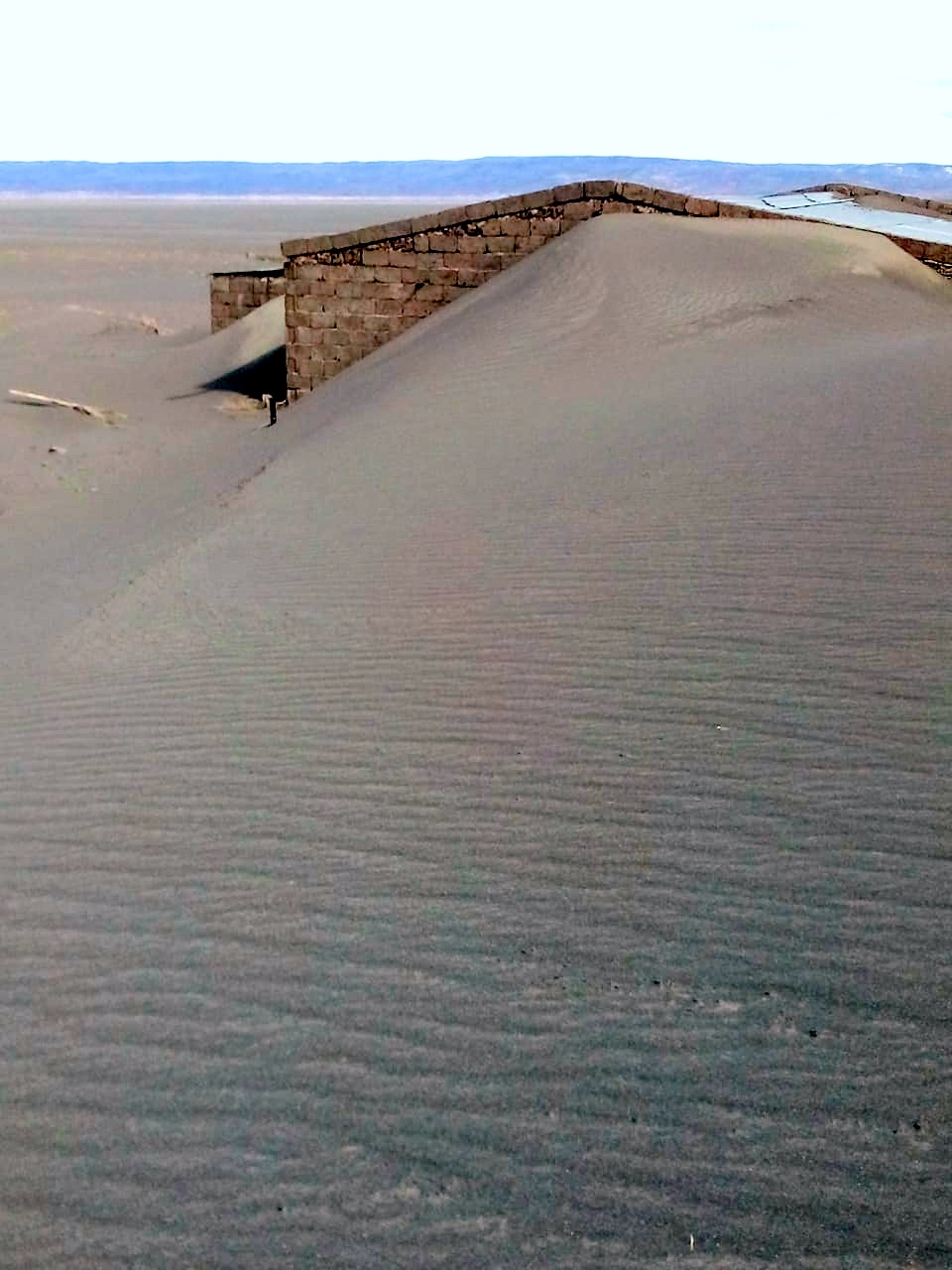
House buried by the dunes that break away from the dry lake in the background.

== See also ==
- Lake Musters

== Additional sources ==
- Catálogo de Lagos y Embalses de la República Argentina» del «Sistema Nacional de Información Hídrica (in Spanish), Undersecretary for Water Resources of Argentina.
- "Colhué Huapí." Microsoft® Student 2008 [DVD]. Microsoft Corporation, 2007.
