= Bruno Báez =

Argentine professional footballer

Personal information
- Date of birth: 6 April 2000 (age 26)
- Place of birth: Rufino, Argentina
- Height: 1.87 m (6 ft 2 in)
- Position: Forward

Team information
- Current team: Arsenal de Sarandí

Youth career
- Club Matienzo
- 2018–2020: Arsenal de Sarandí

Senior career*
Years	Team	Apps	(Gls)
2020–	Arsenal de Sarandí	6	(1)
- * Club domestic league appearances and goals as of 16:29, 20 March 2022 (UTC)

Bruno Báez (born 6 April 2000) is an Argentine professional footballer who plays as a forward for Arsenal de Sarandí.

== Career ==
Báez played for Club Matienzo at youth level, prior to joining Arsenal de Sarandí in 2018. He made the breakthrough into the latter's first-team squad in November 2020, with manager Sergio Rondina selecting him to come off the bench in a home defeat to Unión Santa Fe on 20 November; replacing Gastón Suso in the Copa de la Liga Profesional fixture. After a further appearance against River Plate on 27 December, Báez scored his first goal during a 1–0 home win over Huracán on 10 January.

== Career statistics ==
As of 19 February 2021.

Appearances and goals by club, season and competition
Club	Season	League			Cup		League Cup		Continental		Other		Total	
Club	Season	Division	Apps	Goals	Apps	Goals	Apps	Goals	Apps	Goals	Apps	Goals	Apps	Goals
Arsenal de Sarandí	2020–21 (Note: Soccerway counts 2020 Copa de la Liga Profesional appearances as league appearances.)	Primera División	3	1	1	0	0	0	—		0	0	4	1
Arsenal de Sarandí	2021 (Note: Soccerway counts 2021 Copa de la Liga Profesional appearances as league appearances.)	Primera División	0	0	0	0	—		—		0	0	0	0
Career total			3	1	1	0	0	0	—		0	0	4	1
