= Henry L. Brandon =

Henry Logan Brandon (April 22, 1923 – June 21, 1997) was an American Naval Aviator and attorney. He sat on the Board of Directors of Unocal Corporation of California, and was the company's Vice President of International Development. He also sat on the board of directors of Union Oil in Dahomey (now Benin), West Africa.

== Background and family ==
Henry Logan Brandon was born in Moore County, Tennessee, on April 22, 1923. He died on June 21, 1997, in Pasadena, California.

== World War II ==
Henry L. Brandon enlisted November 19, 1942, and trained at the Naval Air Primary Training Command 1943. He served as a Naval Aviator from 1945 to 1948. Qualified for carrier landings on an FM-2 Wildcat on the USS Guadalcanal, off Jacksonville, Florida. Went through gunnery training on an FG-1D Corsair at US Naval Air Station Alameda. Joined Corsair Fighter-Bomber Squadron VBF-82 in preparation for Operation Downfall.

After his discharge from the Navy he attended the Southern Methodist University, and Vanderbilt University, where he earned a Juris Doctor.

== International business career with Union Oil ==
During his time with the Unocal Corporation, Brandon worked as the company's general manager in Cuba and Guatemala. In 1961 he became the company's Vice President of International Development. That year he participated in Union's entry into the Indonesian oil market, writing a "contract of work" arrangement, which was a first for Indonesia. In a speech on Indonesian Independence Day in August, 1961, then President Sukarno talked at some length about "production sharing", which included some of Brandon's suggestions.

As Vice President of International Development, he negotiated Unocal's entry into the UAE oil market. In the 1960s, he met extensively with Saqr bin Mohammad Al Qasimi, the Emir of Ras Al Khaimah, to craft the legal agreement between his country and Unocal Corporation.

In 1969 he became Vice President, and a member of the Board of Directors of Union Oil Company of Dahomey, West Africa.

== Footnotes ==
- Taylor, F. (1976). Unearthing Buried Riches. In Sign of the 76: The fabulous life and times of the Union Oil Company of California. (1st ed., Vol. 1, p. 362). Los Angeles: Union Oil Company of California.
