= Rufino, Santa Fe =

Rufino
- City
- Click on the map for a fullscreen view
- Location of Rufino in Argentina
- Coordinates: 34°15′43″S 62°42′41″W
- Country: Argentina
- Province: Santa Fe
- Department: General López

Government
  - Intendant: Abel Natalio Lattanzi (PRO)

Area
  - Total: 845 km^{2} (326 sq mi)
- Elevation: 113 m (371 ft)

Population (2022 census)
  - Total: 19,211
  - Density: 22.7/km^{2} (58.9/sq mi)
- Time zone: UTC−3 (ART)
- CPA base: S6100
- Dialing code: +54 3382

Rufino is a city in the province of Santa Fe, Argentina. It has 19,211 inhabitants as per the 2022 census [INDEC]. It lies on the southwest of the province, 260 km (162 mi) from the main metropolitan area of the province Greater Rosario,416 km (258 mi) from the provincial capital Santa Fe, near the borders with Córdoba (west) and Buenos Aires (south), on the intersection of National Routes 33 and 7.

The town was founded by Gerónimo Segundo Rufino in 1886, as the railway line that linked Diego de Alvear, Santa Fe, to Villa Mercedes, San Luis, was inaugurated. The plans for the new town were approved by the governorship of Santa Fe on 29 March 1889, which is acknowledged as the official foundation date.

== Notable people born in Rufino ==
- Guillermo Coria, tennis player
- Miguel Rolando Covian, biomedical scientist
- Amadeo Carrizo, soccer player
- Ernesto Mastrángelo, soccer player
- Bernabé Ferreyra, soccer player
- Carlos Bulgheroni, businessman in Argentina's energy sector
- Federico Sturzenegger
- Santiago Chocobares, rugby player
- Bruno Báez, footballer
