= Bridas Corporation =

Independent oil and gas holding company

Bridas
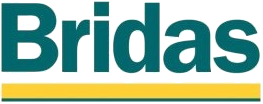
- Type: Private
- Industry: Petroleum, energy
- Founded: 1948; 78 years ago
- Founder: Bulgheroni Family
- Headquarters: Buenos Aires, Argentina
- Key people: Alejandro Bulgheroni (Chairman)
- Products: refined petroleum fuel natural gas electricity
- Revenue: ▲US$600 million (1997)
- Net income: ▲US$310 million (1997)
- Owner: CNOOC (50%)

Bridas Corporation is an Argentine independent oil and gas holding company based in Buenos Aires. Since March 2010 it is 50% owned by China National Offshore Oil Corporation.

== Operations ==
Bridas Corporation was founded by the Bulgheroni family in 1948, and grew to become the second-largest producer of fossil fuels in Argentina (after the state-owned YPF), with production of over 78 million boe in 2004. Bridas has focused in the South America Southern Cone and Central Asia. Its activities includes four principal areas of operations:

- exploration and development of oil and gas reserves and the production of oil and gas;
- marketing and transportation of oil, gas and oil products;
- gathering, treatment, processing and distribution of gas and power generation;
- drilling and well services.

== Trans-Afghanistan pipeline controversy ==
Bridas began expanding into the Central Asian energy sector in 1987, and secured its first large-scale contract (gas exploration rights in Turkmenistan), in 1992. Between 1995 and 1997, CEO Carlos Bulgheroni was personally involved in negotiations between Bridas and the governments of Pakistan and Turkmenistan, as well as the ruling Taliban faction in Afghanistan, to build the Trans-Afghanistan Gas Pipeline. These negotiations were in competition with those undertaken by Unocal, and although an agreement with Unocal-led corporation CentGas was reached, the deal was forfeited in January 1998 in favor of one with Bridas. Instability in Afghanistan delayed construction of the pipeline. In 2006, Bulgheroni indicated interest in Bridas' involvement with the Trans-Afghanistan Pipeline project, which continued to be hampered by the ongoing war in the Central Asian nation.

== Pan American Energy ==
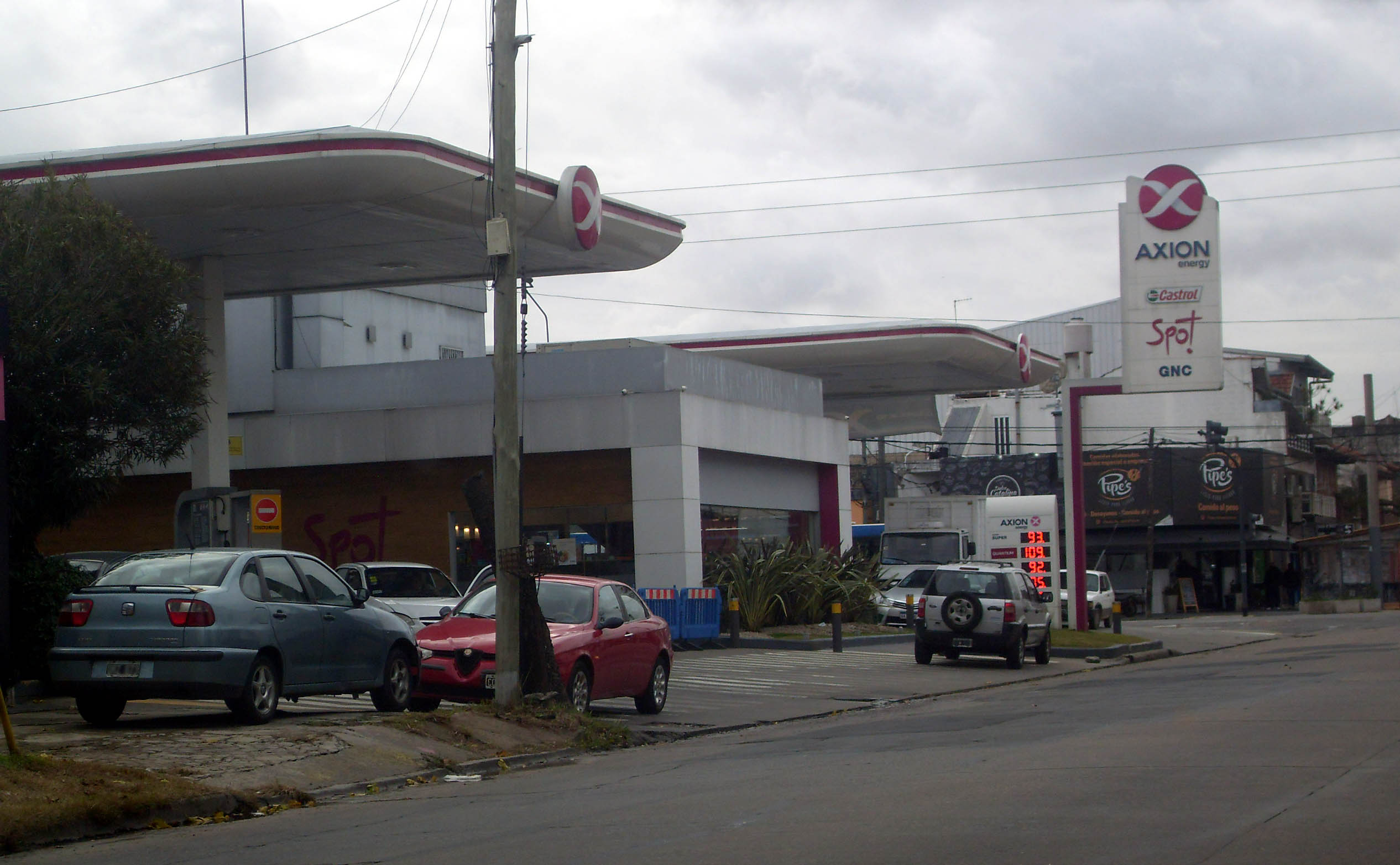
Bridas operates the Axion Energy gas station brand in Argentina after acquiring rights to ExxonMobil

In 1997, Bridas and Amoco (now BP) established a joint venture named Pan American Energy. The stake of BP is 60% and the stake of Bridas is 40%. On November 28, 2010, it was announced that Bridas would acquire the BP's stake for $7.06 billion in cash. In 2011 the deal was cancelled. In September 2017, BP and Bridas agreed to merge their interests in Pan American Energy and Axion Energy to form a jointly owned Pan American Energy Group.
