= Turkmenistan–Afghanistan–Pakistan–India Pipeline =

Natural gas pipeline

Turkmenistan–Afghanistan–Pakistan–India (TAPI) gas pipeline
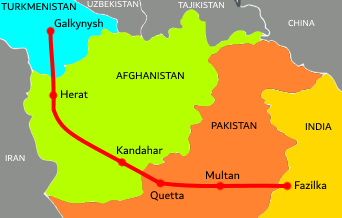
- Map of Turkmenistan–Afghanistan–Pakistan–India (TAPI) gas pipeline

Location
- Country: Turkmenistan; Afghanistan; Pakistan; India
- Direction: North–South
- Start: Galkynysh gas field, Turkmenistan
- Passes through: Herat; Kandahar; Quetta; Multan
- To: Fazilka, India
- Runs alongside: Kandahar–Herat Highway

General information
- Type: Natural gas
- Partners: Türkmengaz
- Construction started: 2015

Technical information
- Length: 1,814 km (1,127 mi)
- Maximum discharge: 33×10^{9} m^{3}/a (1.2×10^{12} cu ft/a)

Turkmenistan–Afghanistan–Pakistan–India (TAPI) is a natural gas pipeline being developed by the Galkynysh – TAPI Pipeline Company Limited with participation of the Asian Development Bank. The pipeline will eventually extend about 1,814 km (1,127 mi) in length and transport natural gas from the Galkynysh Gas Field in Turkmenistan through Afghanistan into Pakistan and then to India.

The TAPI pipeline was completed on the Turkmenistan side in 2024. A year later Kazakhstan showed interest in joining the pipeline project. The project is currently expanding southbound in Herat Province of Afghanistan. Proponents of the project see it as a modern continuation of the Silk Road.

== History ==
The roots of this project lies in the involvement of international oil companies in Kazakhstan and Turkmenistan in the beginning of 1990s. As Russia, who controlled all export pipelines of these countries, consistently refused to allow the use of its pipeline network, these companies needed an independent export route avoiding both Iran and Russia.

The original project started on 15 March 1995 when an inaugural memorandum of understanding between the governments of Turkmenistan and Pakistan for a pipeline project was signed. This project was promoted by Argentinian company Bridas Corporation. The U.S. company Unocal, in conjunction with the Saudi oil company Delta, promoted an alternative project without Bridas' involvement. On 21 October 1995, these two companies signed a separate agreement with Turkmenistan's president Saparmurat Niyazov. In August 1996, the Central Asia Gas Pipeline, Ltd. (CentGas) consortium for construction of a pipeline, led by Unocal, was formed. On 27 October 1997, CentGas was incorporated in formal signing ceremonies in Ashgabat, Turkmenistan, by several international oil companies along with the Government of Turkmenistan.

Since the pipeline was to pass through Afghanistan, it was necessary to work with the Taliban. The U.S. ambassador to Pakistan, Robert Oakley, left his post and was hired by CentGas in 1997. In January 1998, the Taliban, selecting CentGas over Argentinian competitor Bridas Corporation, signed an agreement that allowed the proposed project to proceed. In June 1998, Russian Gazprom relinquished its 10% stake in the project. On 7 August 1998, American embassies in Nairobi and Dar es Salaam were bombed. The United States alleged that Osama bin Laden was behind those attacks, and all pipeline negotiations halted, as the Taliban's then leader, Mullah Omar, announced that bin Laden had the Taliban's support. Unocal withdrew from the consortium on 8 December 1998, and soon after closed its offices in Afghanistan and Pakistan.

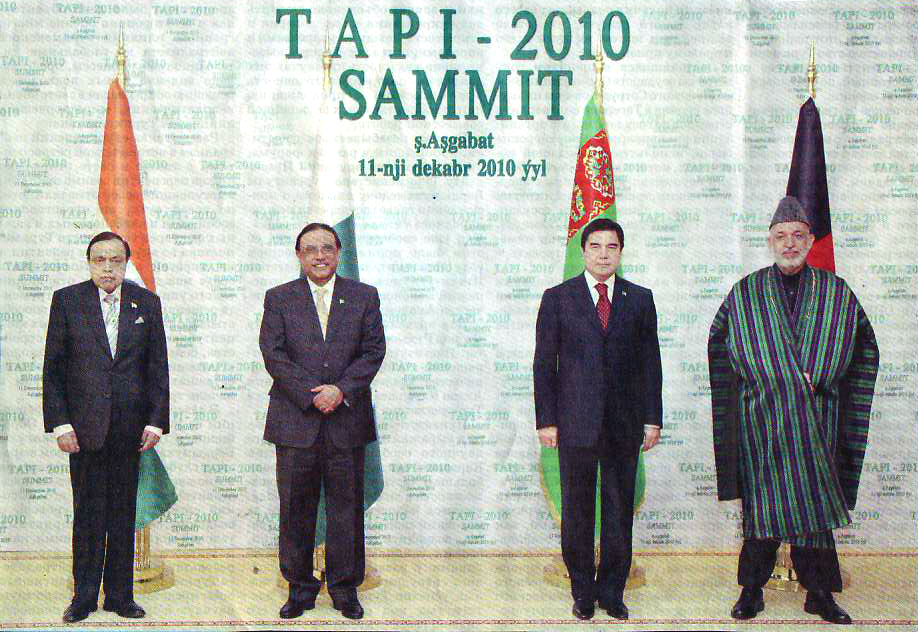
Summit in Ashgabat for the signing of agreement regarding the Turkmenistan–Afghanistan–Pakistan–India (TAPI) pipeline project on 11 December 2010

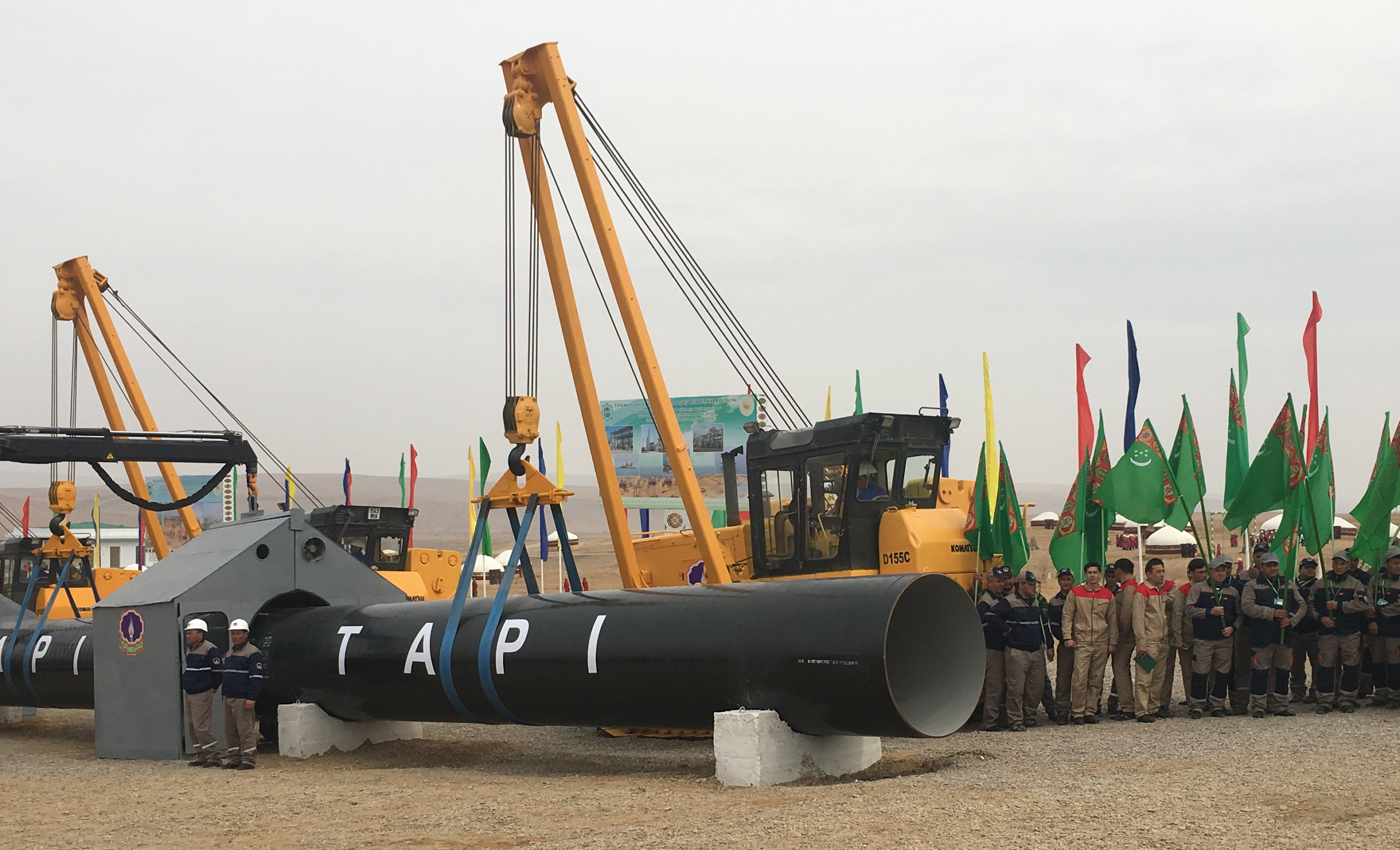
Ceremony on completion of the Turkmen section of the TAPI pipeline

The new deal on the pipeline was signed on 27 December 2002 by government officials in Turkmenistan, Afghanistan and Pakistan. In 2005, the Asian Development Bank submitted the final version of a feasibility study designed by British company Penspen. The project has drawn strong US support as it would allow the Central Asian republics to export energy to Western markets "without relying on Russian routes". Then-US Ambassador to Turkmenistan Tracey Ann Jacobson noted, "We are seriously looking at the project, and it is quite possible that American companies will join it". Due to increasing instability, the project has essentially stalled; construction of the Turkmen part was supposed to start in 2006, but the overall feasibility was questionable since the southern part of the Afghan section ran through territory under de facto Taliban control.

On 24 April 2008, Pakistan, India and Afghanistan signed a framework agreement to buy natural gas from Turkmenistan. The intergovernmental agreement on the pipeline was signed on 11 December 2010 in Ashgabat. However, in April 2012, India and Afghanistan have failed to agree on transit fee for gas passing through Afghan territory. Consequently, Islamabad and New Delhi too could not agree on the transit fee for the segment of the pipeline passing through Pakistan, which has linked its fee structure to any India-Afghanistan agreement. On 16 May 2012, the Afghan Parliament, approved the agreement on a gas pipeline and the day after, the Indian Cabinet allowed state-run gas-firm GAIL to sign the Gas Sale and Purchase Agreement (GSPA) with Türkmengaz, Turkmenistan's national oil company.

The TAPI project started in Turkmenistan on 13 December 2015 and was completed by mid-2019. Work on the Afghan side was scheduled to start in February 2018, but was delayed until late 2024. After securing an implementation plan with Pakistan a year earlier, in August 2024 the Foreign Minister of Turkmenistan Raşit Meredow met virtually with Mullah Abdul Ghani Baradar, Afghanistan's Deputy Prime Minister for Economic Affairs. Following this meeting, Foreign Minister Meredow "said that Turkmenistan is ready to begin work on the TAPI project in Afghanistan with the aim of developing political and economic relations." Work later resumed on the project around the Afghanistan–Turkmenistan border region. It was announced that by the end of 2026 the gas pipeline will reach the city of Herat in Afghanistan.

== Technical features ==
The pipeline will be 1,420 mm (56 in) in diameter with a working pressure of 100 atm (10,000 kPa). The capacity will be 33×10^{9} m^{3} (1.2×10^{12} cu ft) of natural gas per year of which 5×10^{9} m^{3} (180×10^{9} cu ft) will be provided to Afghanistan and 14×10^{9} m^{3} (490×10^{9} cu ft) to each Pakistan and India. Six compressor stations would be constructed along the pipeline.

Originally, the cost of the pipeline project was reportedly estimated at US$7.6 billion, but a more recent estimate was $10 billion. The leading partner of the project is Türkmengaz.

== Route ==
The 1,814 km (1,127 mi) pipeline will run from the world's second largest gas field namely Galkynysh gas fields in Turkmenistan through Afghanistan and Pakistan to India. In Afghanistan, TAPI pipeline will be constructed alongside the Kandahar–Herat Highway in western Afghanistan, and then via Quetta and Multan in Pakistan. The final destination of the pipeline will be the Indian town of Fazilka, near the border between Pakistan and India.

== See also ==
- Afghanistan Oil Pipeline
- Transport in Afghanistan
- Baku-Tbilisi-Ceyhan pipeline (BTC)
- Enron's Dabhol Power Company
- Trans-Caspian Gas Pipeline
- South Caucasus Pipeline
- CentGas
- Port of Chabahar
- Ashgabat Agreement
