= CentGas =

Former natural gas consortium

Central Asia Gas Pipeline, Ltd. (CentGas) was a consortium formed in the 1990s to develop a project to build the Trans-Afghanistan Pipeline from Turkmenistan's natural gas fields to Pakistan. The consortium had also considered an extension of the pipeline to the New Delhi area. Regional and political instability proved too great a challenge to overcome and the project eventually was cancelled after Unocal (the largest CentGas investor) withdrew from the consortium.

== Consortium group members ==
The consortium was led by Union Oil Company of California (Unocal) and Delta Oil Company of Saudi Arabia. Original members of Cent Gas were:

- Unocal Corporation - one of the world's leading energy resource and project development companies
- Delta Oil Company (Saudi Arabia) - privately owned by Badr M. Al-Aiban
- Gazprom (Russia)
- Government of Turkmenistan; Turkmenrusgas
- Indonesia Petroleum, Ltd. (INPEX) (Japan)
- ITOCHU Oil Exploration Co., Ltd. (CIECO) (Japan)
- Hyundai Engineering and Construction (South Korea) - among top global general contractors
- Crescent Group (Pakistan) - premier industrial and financial conglomerate in Pakistan

In June 1998, Gazprom relinquishes its 10% stake in the CentGas pipeline project. On 8 December 1998, Unocal announced that it was withdrawing from the CentGas consortium.
