= Unocal Corporation =

American petroleum company (1890–2005)

Unocal Corporation Union Oil Company of California
- Traded as: NYSE: UCL (1924–2005)
- Industry: Petroleum
- Founded: October 17, 1890
- Founders: Thomas Bard; Lyman Stewart; Wallace Hardison
- Defunct: August 11, 2005
- Fate: Acquired by Chevron
- Headquarters: Union Oil Center, Los Angeles, California
- Brands: 76 (1932–97)
- Number of employees: 6,400 (2005)
- Website: unocal.com (defunct)

Union Oil Company of California, and its holding company Unocal Corporation, together known as Unocal /ˈjuːnoʊkæl/ was a major petroleum explorer and marketer in the late 19th century, through the 20th century, and into the early 21st century. It was headquartered in El Segundo, California, United States.

Unocal was involved in domestic and global energy projects. Unocal was one of the key players in the CentGas consortium, which attempted to build the Trans-Afghanistan Pipeline to run from the Caspian area, through Afghanistan, to the Indian Ocean, at a time after the Taliban siege of Kabul in 1996.

On August 10, 2005, Chevron acquired Unocal for US$17.9 billion (equivalent to $28.3 billion in 2025), making it a wholly owned subsidiary. Unocal then ceased operations as an independent company, but continues to conduct many operations as Union Oil Company of California, a Chevron company.

== History ==
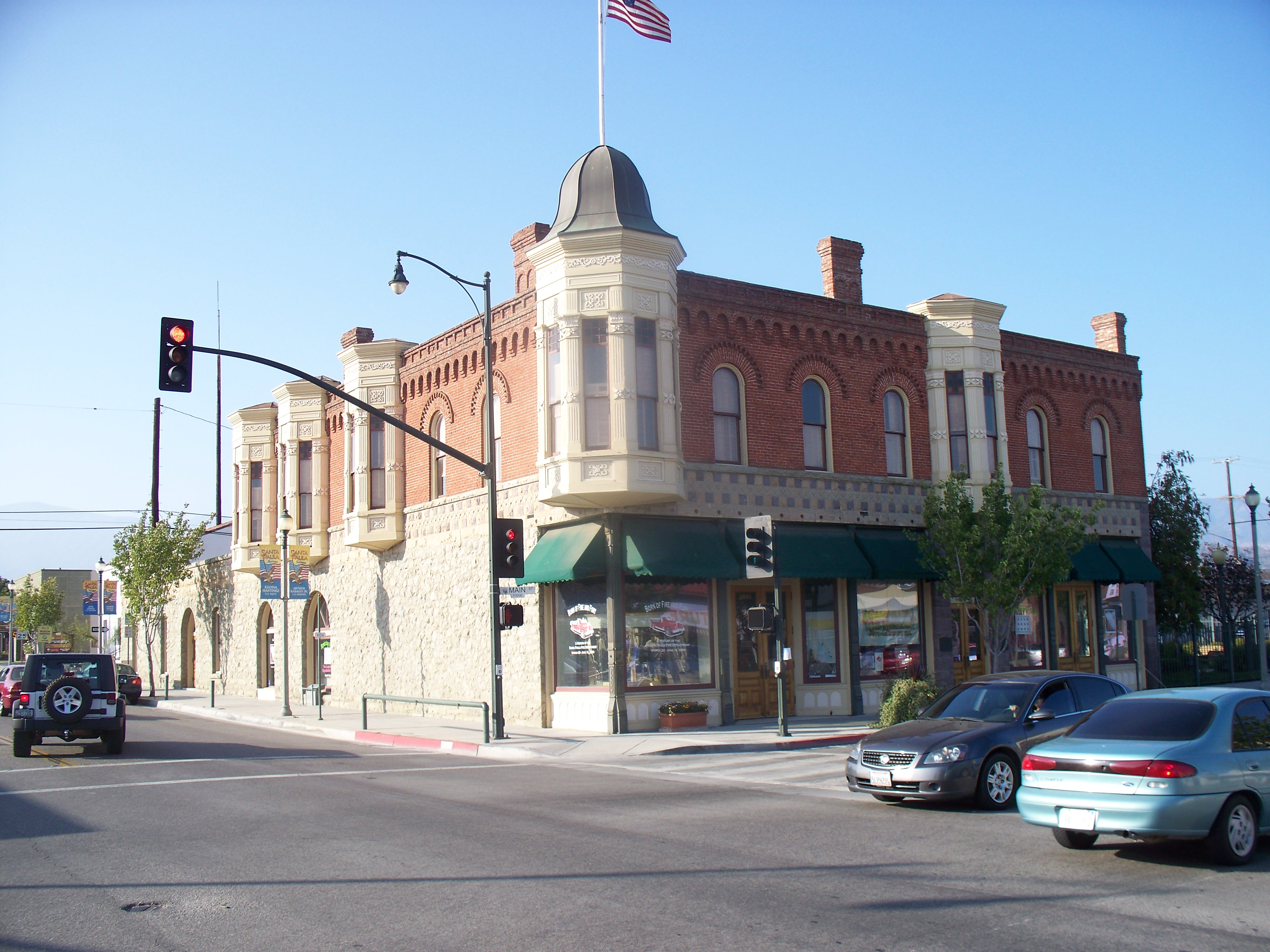
Original Union Oil Co. headquarters in Santa Paula, California, currently the Union 76 Petroleum Museum, pictured in 2009

The Union Oil Company of California was founded on October 17, 1890, in Santa Paula, California, by Lyman Stewart, Thomas Bard, and Wallace Hardison. It was a merger of three Southern California oil companies: the Sespe Oil Company and the Torrey Canyon Oil Company (both owned by Bard) and the Hardison and Stewart Oil Company. All three were notable as being completely unaffiliated with Standard Oil. Union Oil moved its headquarters to Los Angeles in 1901. The original headquarters in Santa Paula is a California Historical Landmark and museum.

About 1910, Union Oil made a strategic alliance with the Independent Producers Agency, a group of small oil producers, to build pipelines from the Kern County oil fields to Union Oil facilities on the Pacific coast. This gave the independent producers an alternative to what they perceived as the low prices paid by Standard Oil and the high freight rates charged by the railroads to move crude oil. It gave Union access to a large volume of crude oil. The situation was later fictionalized in the 2007 film There Will Be Blood.

In 1919, the Union Oil Company of Delaware was incorporated as a holding company for the Union Oil Company of California. In 1920, Union Oil purchased the Central Petroleum Company from the Texas Company. In 1922, the Union Oil Associates, Inc., was incorporated in California as a holding company to prevent control of the Union Oil Company of California passing to foreign interests after the merger of the Union Oil Company of Delaware with two subsidiaries of Royal Dutch-Shell to form Shell Oil Company.

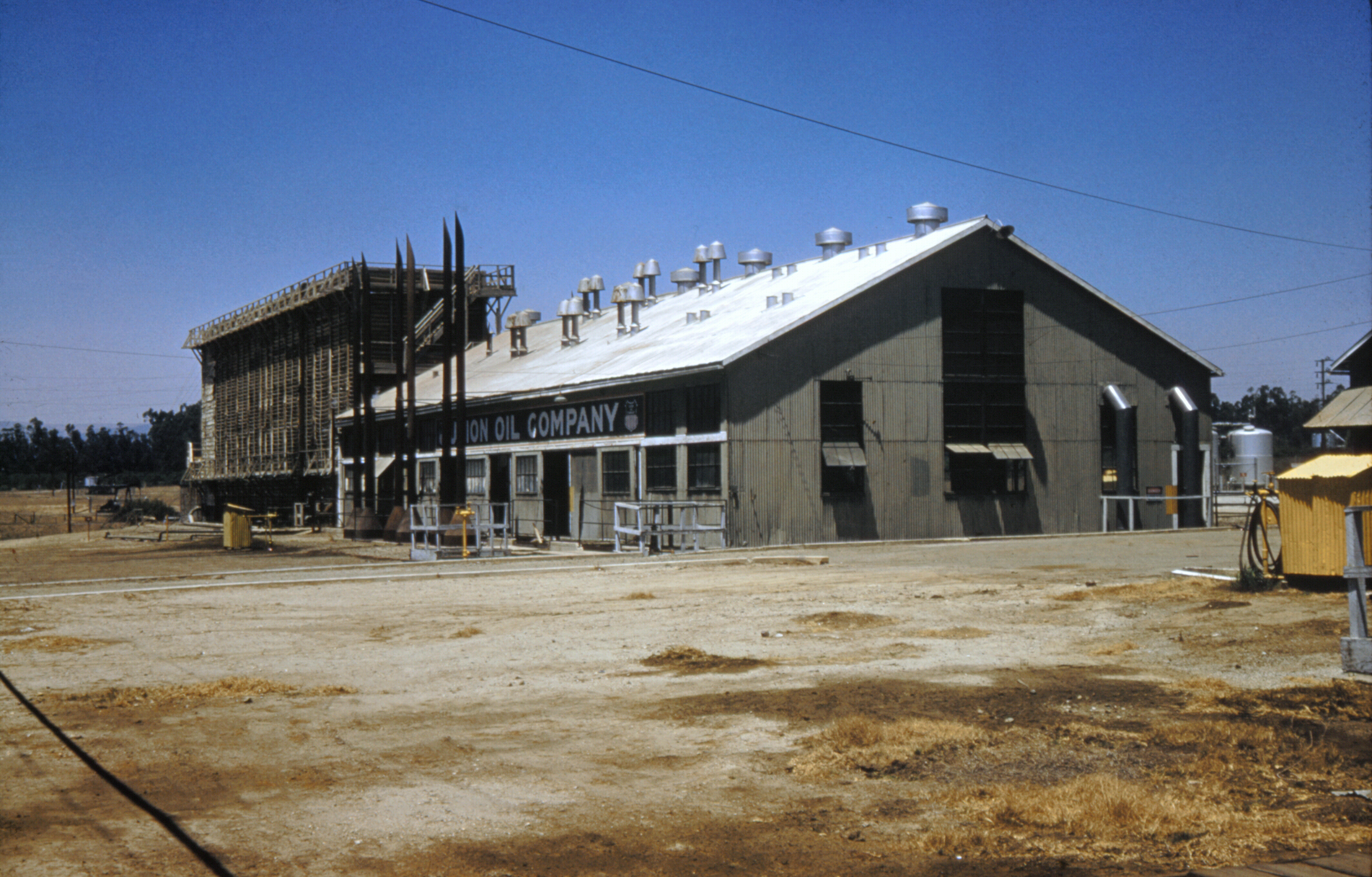
Cracking plant in Orange County, California, 1961

In 1961, Union entered the Indonesian oil market. Henry L. Brandon, Union's vice president of international development wrote a "contract of work" arrangement, which was a first for Indonesia. In a speech on Indonesian Independence Day in August 1961, then president Sukarno talked at some length about "production sharing", which included language written into the contract by Union executives.

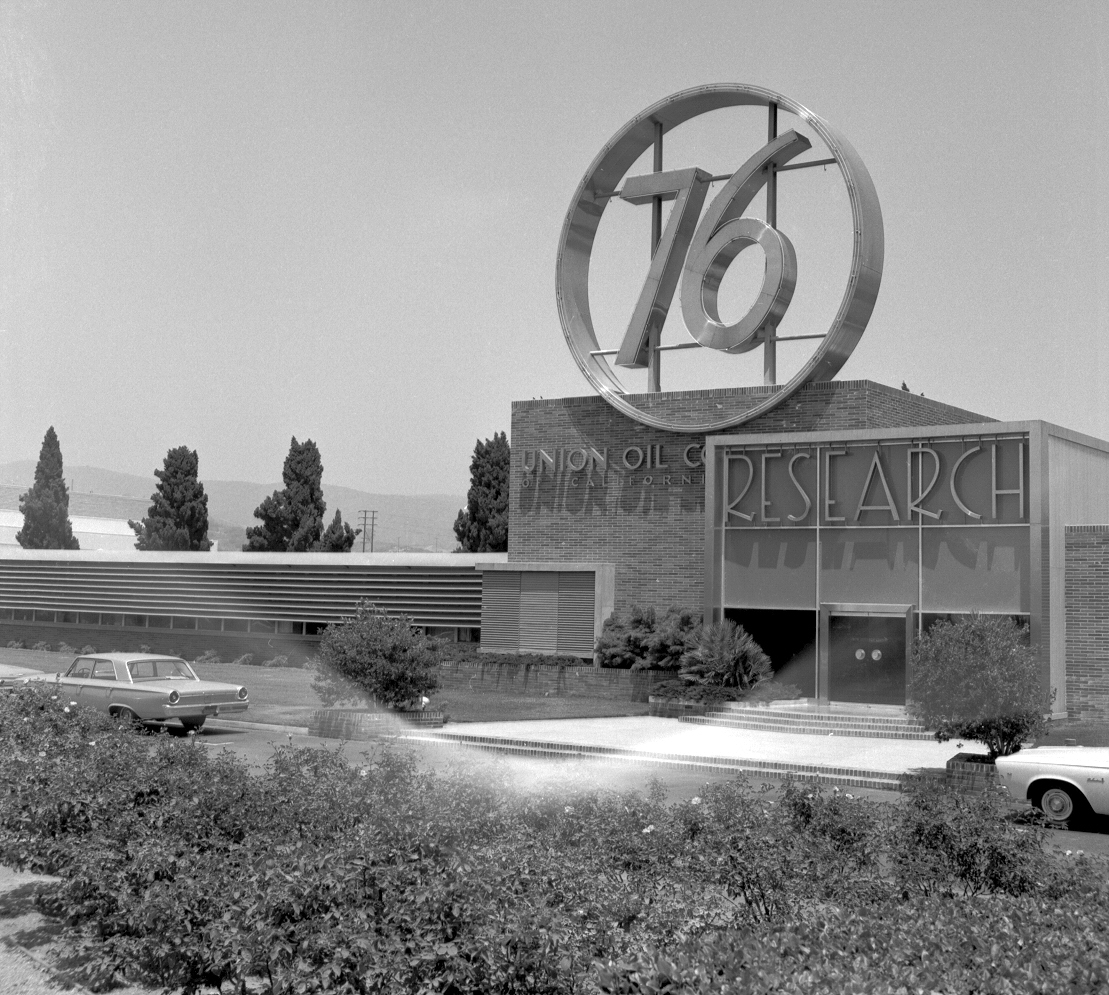
Research facility in Brea, California, circa 1965

The company expanded to national status in 1965, when Union Oil merged with the Pure Oil Company, headquartered in what was then Palatine, Illinois, and now Schaumburg, Illinois. Over the next two decades, Union became the major oil producer in southern Alaska and a major natural gas producer in the Gulf of Mexico. The company was reorganized in 1983, and Union Oil Company of California became an operating subsidiary of a new Delaware-based holding company, Unocal Corporation. In 1985, Mesa Petroleum, controlled by billionaire T. Boone Pickens, attempted a takeover of Unocal Corp. that resulted in the Delaware Supreme Court landmark decision Unocal v. Mesa Petroleum, which upheld Unocal's takeover defense. Virtually all operations are conducted by Union Oil Company of California (Union Oil).

In 1977, Unocal acquired The Molybdenum Corporation of America (now Molycorp). Among the assets acquired was Mountain Pass rare earth mine, then the world's largest producer of rare earth elements.

In 1989, Unocal placed its midwest refining and marketing assets, including Union's 150,000-barrel-per-day (24,000 m^{3}/d) Lemont Refinery in Lemont, Illinois, into a 50/50 joint venture with Petróleos de Venezuela, S.A. (P.D.V.S.A.). The joint venture, known as the Uno-Ven Company, was headquartered in Arlington Heights, Illinois, and primarily comprising employees from Union Oil's then Schaumburg, Illinois, division headquarters and Lemont, Illinois, refinery. The joint venture was dissolved in 1997, with P.D.V.S.A. receiving full ownership. During the life of the joint venture, the familiar Union 76 brand name continued in full force. At the termination of the joint venture, most stations were converted to Citgo, which is controlled by P.D.V.S.A.

In 1997, Unocal sold its western United States refining and marketing operations to Tosco Corporation, including the rights to the Union 76 brand for refining and marketing (except in states where Uno-Ven operated). Tosco was later acquired by Phillips Petroleum, which later merged with Conoco to form ConocoPhillips. As of January 2025, Chevron still maintains a common law trademark of Unocal.com, which redirects to the Chevron webpage.

=== Acquisition ===
In April 2005, the United States oil company Chevron made an offer to acquire Unocal for US$16.6 billion, which was followed, after the companies had agreed to the transaction, by a competing unsolicited bid from the Chinese firm CNOOC Limited of US$18.5 billion on June 22. The final Chevron offer of US$17.9 billion (equivalent to $28.3 billion in 2025) was approved by Unocal shareholders on August 10. The final CNOOC bid was nearly 5% greater than that of Chevron, but faced significant political opposition from the United States Congress and was finally withdrawn by CNOOC August 2 citing the associated political uncertainty. Following a vote in the United States House of Representatives, the CNOOC bid was referred to President George W. Bush, on the grounds that its implications for national security needed to be reviewed. Unocal then ceased operations as an independent company, with its entire upstream petroleum business moved to Chevron, but continues to conduct many operations as Union Oil Company of California, a Chevron company, a wholly owned subsidiary of Chevron.

== Operations ==
=== Central Asia ===
Unocal was one of the key players in the CentGas consortium, an attempt to build the Trans-Afghanistan Pipeline to run from the Caspian area, through Afghanistan and probably Pakistan, to the Indian Ocean. One of the consultants to Unocal at that time was Zalmay Khalilzad, former US ambassador to Afghanistan, Iraq, and the United Nations.

In the 1980s, CIA chief Bill Casey had revived the agency's practice of gaining intelligence from traveling businessmen. Marty Miller, one of Unocal's top executives, conducted negotiations in several Central Asian countries from 1995, and voluntarily provided information gained on these trips to the CIA's Houston station.

In 1996, Unocal opened an office in Kandahar, Afghanistan, while the Taliban were in the process of taking control of the country.

Unocal rented a house in central Kandahar directly across the street from one of [Osama] bin Laden's new compounds. They did not choose this location deliberately. Most of the decent houses in town straddled the Herat Bazaar Road. Also near was the Pakistani consulate, which housed officers from [the Pakistani military Inter-Services Intelligence, the] ISI.

— Steve Coll, Ghost Wars

In 1997,

Robert Oakley [ex-US ambassador to Pakistan, now on Unocal's ad hoc advisory board] advised Miller to reach the Taliban by working through Pakistan's government [then led by Benazir Bhutto]. He also suggested that Unocal hire Thomas Gouttiere, an Afghan specialist at the University of Nebraska at Omaha, to develop a job training program in Kandahar that would teach Pashtuns the technical skills needed to build a pipeline. ... Unocal agreed to pay $900,000 via the University of Nebraska to set up a Unocal training facility on a fifty-six acre site in Kandahar, not far from bin Laden's compounds. ... Gouttiere traveled in and out of Afghanistan and met with Taliban leaders. ... In December 1997 Gouttiere worked with Miller to arrange for another Taliban delegation to visit the United States. ...

— Steve Coll, Ghost Wars

Unocal seems to have had a deeper role. Intelligence "whistleblower" Julie Sirrs claimed that anti-Taliban leader Ahmad Shah Massoud told her he had "proof that Unocal had provided money that helped the Taliban take Kabul [in 1996]". And French journalist Richard Labeviere said, referring to the later 1990s, "The CIA and Unocal's security forces ... provided military weapons and instructors to several Taleban militia[s] ..." US State Department officials openly promoted the pipeline, and former Secretary of State Henry Kissinger served as a Unocal consultant.

The Taliban and Unocal were in negotiations in Texas to discuss arrangements for the gas pipeline from Turkmenistan to Pakistan in 1997 although it faced competition with from the Argentine Bridas Corporation.

While no deal was ultimately agreed with either company, the Taliban were leaning toward making a deal with Unocal as of August 1998. The company suspended work on the project following the U.S. cruise missile strikes on Afghanistan in response to the 1998 U.S. Embassy bombings and completely pulled out in December 1998 citing low oil prices and a need to cut costs in addition to regional instability.

Unocal was also the third-largest member of the Baku-Tbilisi-Ceyhan pipeline from the Caspian Sea to the Mediterranean Sea.

=== Indonesia ===
Unocal entered the Indonesian market in 1961. Under the leadership of Henry L. Brandon (VP of International Development), Union Oil was the first US oil company to sign a production sharing agreement (contract of work) with President Suharto.

== Sponsorships ==
Union Oil was the sponsor of the Major Burnham Bowling Trophy, an annual California bowling event supported by the Boy Scouts of America and named after Major Frederick Russell Burnham.

76 was the official fuel and motor oil of NASCAR from the sport's inaugural season in 1948 until the end of the 2003 season when Sunoco became the official fuel and Mobil 1 became the official motor oil.

76 was an initial sponsor of the Los Angeles Dodgers when the team relocated from Brooklyn in 1958. The 76 logo was the only corporate sponsorship visible in Dodger Stadium for many years after it opened in 1962. 76 logos currently adorn the batter's on-deck circles and the logo is atop the two large scoreboards in right and left field. A 76 gas station was located in the Dodger Stadium parking lot for decades. It is no longer an operating station, but the building continues to stand, serving as an event space. The 76 logo is often seen in other Major League Baseball and National Football League stadiums on the west coast.

== Controversy ==
=== Domestic US criticism ===
In 1969, a blowout on the ocean bottom near Union Oil's Platform "A" on the Dos Cuadras field leaked between 80,000 and 100,000 barrels (16,000 m^{3}) of oil into the water of the Santa Barbara Channel, near Santa Barbara, California. The event led to widespread criticism of both Union Oil and the offshore oil drilling industry, and was one of the events leading to the passage of the 1970 National Environmental Policy Act (NEPA).

Oil pipes under Avila Beach, California, leaked from the 1950s until 1996. A real estate firm determined the soil to be contaminated in 1989 and Unocal agreed to clean up the soil they contaminated. To clean up the massive spill, the crew had to excavate enough soil to fill a football field up to 60 feet (18 m) high.

Between the mid-1950s and 1994, Unocal leaked 18 million US gallons (68,000 m^{3}) of diluent—a petroleum derivative pumped into heavy oil fields to make the oil flow freely—under the Guadalupe-Nipomo Dunes and nearby ocean water, the largest oil spill in California's history. The pipelines had leaks in at least 90 places. Locals had noticed a strange sheen on the ocean surface, and dead seals and sea lions began washing up onto the beach. Although Unocal denied having any problems, records discovered by state fish and game officers disclosed that Unocal had long been aware of the leaks. Unocal has been actively cleaning up the site since the mid-90s, receiving praise from the Sierra Club for their habitat restoration work.

=== Doe v. Unocal ===
In the Doe v. Unocal case, Burmese villagers sued Unocal for complicity in forced labor, rape, torture, and murder. EarthRights International, the Center for Constitutional Rights, Paul Hoffman, Hadsell & Stormer, and Judith Brown Chomsky served as co-counsel to the plaintiffs. In 2005, a settlement agreement was reached to compensate the plaintiffs.

== Leadership ==
=== President ===
1. Thomas R. Bard, 1890–1894
2. D. T. Perkins, 1894
3. Lyman Stewart, 1894–1914
4. William L. Stewart Sr, 1914–1930
5. L. Pressley St Clair, 1930–1938
6. Reese H. Taylor, 1938–1956
7. Arthur C. Rubel, 1956–1960
8. Dudley Tower, 1960–1962
9. Arthur C. Rubel, 1962–1964
10. Fred L. Hartley, 1964–1985
11. Richard J. Stegemeier, 1985–1992
12. Roger C. Beach, 1992–2000
13. Timothy H. Ling, 2000–2004
14. Joseph H. Bryant, 2004–2005

=== Chairman of the Board ===
1. Lyman Stewart, 1914–1923
2. E. W. Clark, 1930–1931
3. Reese H. Taylor, 1956–1962
4. William L. Stewart Jr, 1962–1964
5. Arthur C. Rubel, 1964–1965
6. Fred L. Hartley, 1974–1989
7. Richard J. Stegemeier, 1989–1995
8. Roger C. Beach, 1995–2000
9. John W. Creighton Jr., 2001
10. Charles R. Williamson, 2001–2005

== See also ==
- Unocal Corp. v. Mesa Petroleum Co.
