= Lake Musters and Lake Colhué Huapí =

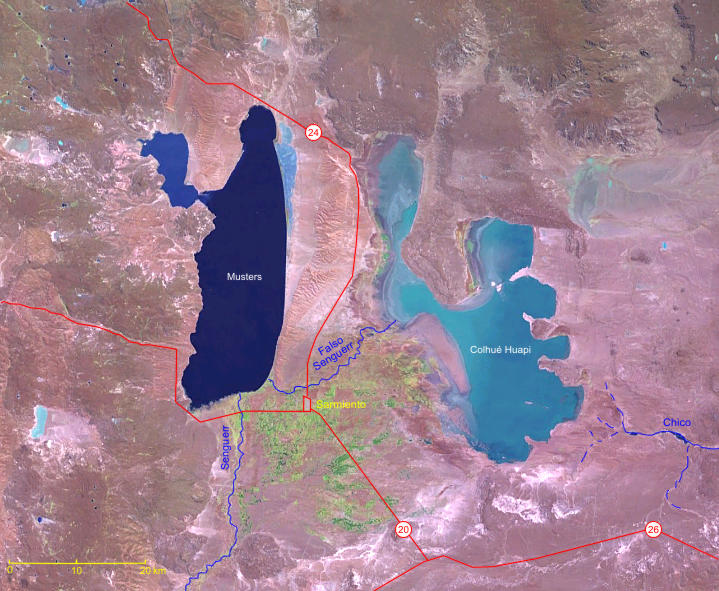
Hybrid map and satellite view of lakes Musters and Colhué Huapí

Lake Musters and Lake Colhué Huapi (45°25′S 69°11′W, at altitudes of around 260 metres (850 ft)) form the terminal stage of the Senguerr River endorheic basin, located in the patagonic central region of Argentina in the south of Chubut province. Closest populated area is Sarmiento, an 8,000 inhabitant former Welsh immigrant colony. The lakes gave their names to the Mustersan and Colhuehuapian South American land mammal ages.

== Description ==
=== Inflow ===
The basin lakes are fed mainly by the eastward running Senguerr river which begins its journey in the glacial lakes La Plata and Fontana in the Andes. The inflow ranges from 35 to 54 m^{3}/sec and varies seasonally and yearly greatly.

=== Outflow ===
Both lakes have naturally a high evaporation process in the dry Patagonian environment by means of strong winds action and solar radiation. In shallow Colhué Huapi evaporation is much increased. In past decades, when excessive inflows did take place, water discharged to the birth branches of Chico River and eventually reached Chubut River. This occasional process last happened in 1939, since then Chico River is mostly a dry one.

Lake Musters
- Location within Chubut Province
- Location: Sarmiento Department, Chubut Province
- Coordinates: 45°22′S 69°11′W
- Primary inflows: Senguerr river
- Primary outflows: Senguerr river
- Catchment area: 9,700 km^{2} (3,700 sq mi)
- Basin countries: Argentina
- Surface area: 450 km^{2} (170 sq mi)
- Average depth: 20 m (66 ft)
- Max. depth: 38.5 m (126 ft)
- Water volume: 8,280 hm^{3} (6,710,000 acre⋅ft)
- Shore length^{1}: 150 km (93 mi)
- ^{1} Shore length is not a well-defined measure.

== Lake Musters ==
This lake, once called Otrón by the ancient tehuelches, received its current name in 1876 from naturalist and geographer Francisco Pascasio Moreno who aimed to honour the Patagonian adventurer George Chaworth Musters.

Musters occupies a Cretaceous conformed depression in the central Patagonic mesa in the Golfo San Jorge Basin. It receives the highly branched inflow of Senguerr river by its southern coast after a 350 kilometres (220 mi) voyage from the Andes. Several of those branches reach lake Colhué Huapí by a sinuous course called Falso Senguerr; the only permanent one feeding such lake.

The lake is of tectonic origin, with average depths of 20 metres (66 ft), which gives a deep blue water hue. It is considered mesotrophic, based on its nutrient and algae mass (<5.2 g/m^{3} or 0.0088 lb/cu yd). Musters presents an abundant aquatic fauna comprising Patagonian perch (Percichthys trucha) and patagonian silversides (Odontesthes microlepidotus). Also, as is the case with most Patagonian lakes, foreign salmonidae have been implanted, like Salvelinus fontinalis, rainbow trout, and in lesser amounts, Salmo fario. These species have added environmental pressure over two native species nowadays endangered in the lake (Diplomystres viedmensis mesembrinus and Galaxias platei).

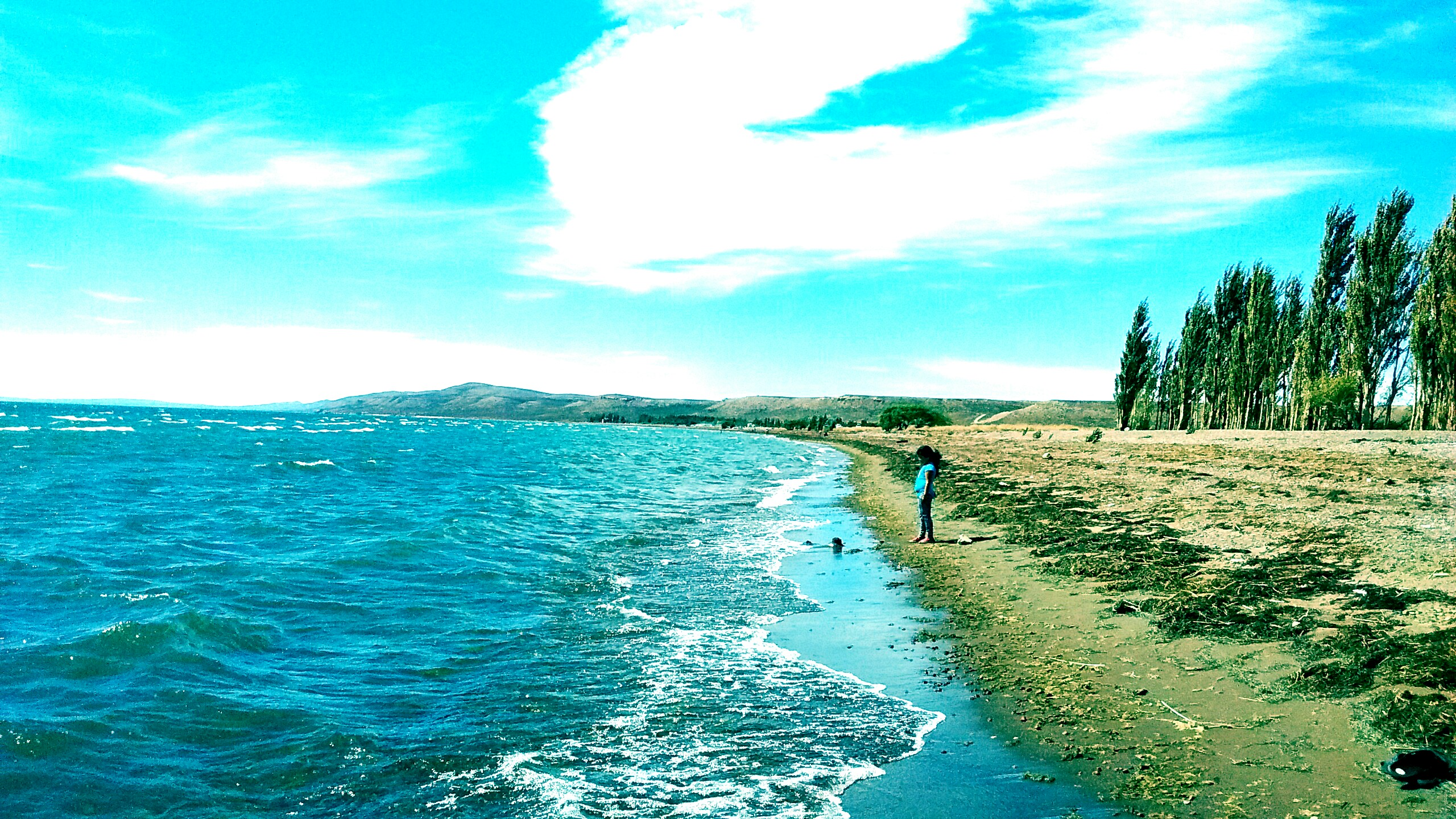
Lake Musters

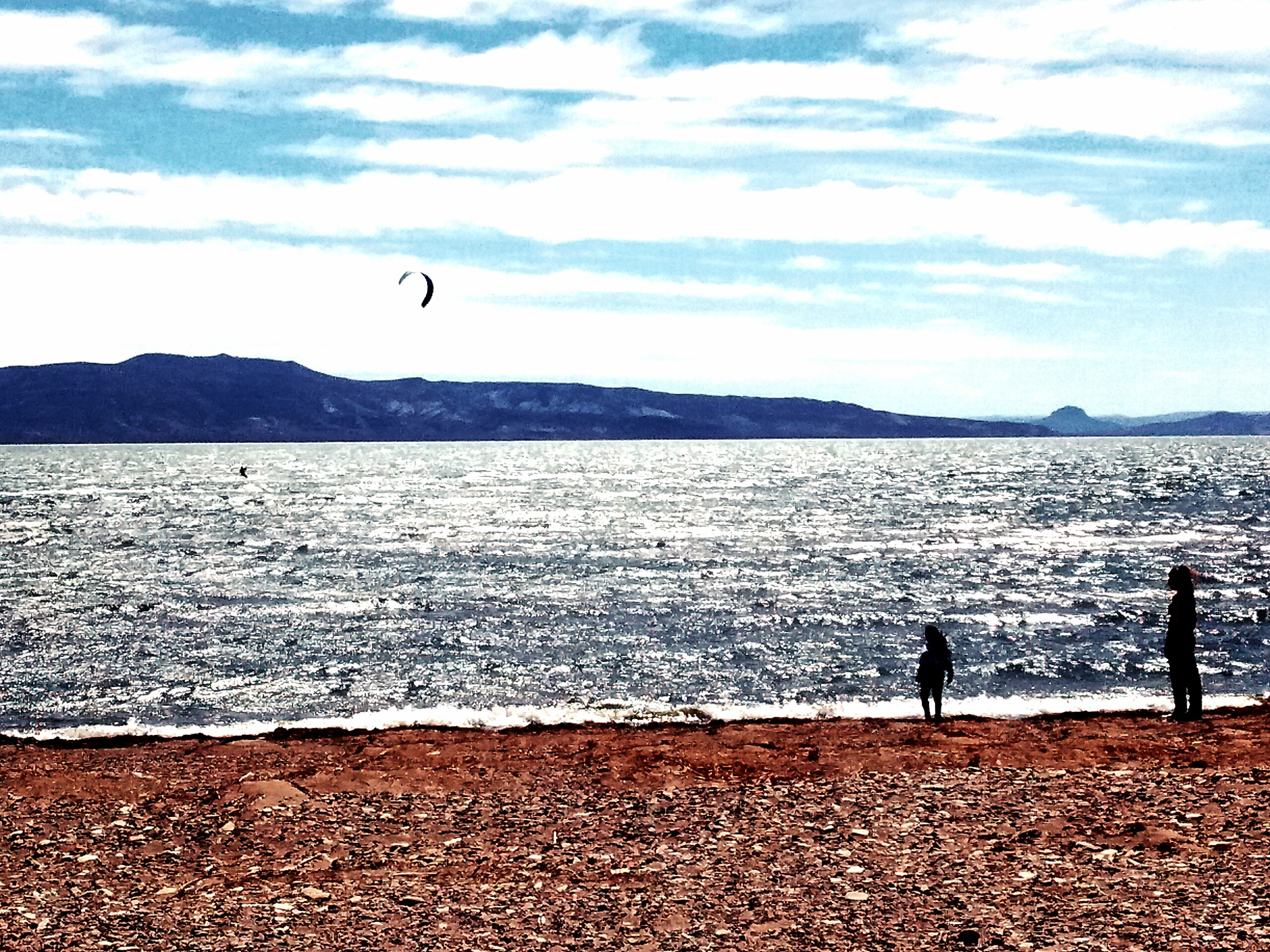
Paragliding at Lake Musters.

Lake Colhué Huapí
- Location within Chubut Province
- Location: Chubut Province
- Coordinates: 45°29′38″S 68°45′26″W
- Type: endorheic
- Primary inflows: Senguerr river
- Primary outflows: evaporation
- Catchment area: 10,900 km^{2} (4,200 sq mi)
- Basin countries: Argentina
- Max. length: 50 km (31 mi)
- Surface area: 810 km^{2} (310 sq mi)
- Average depth: 2 m (6 ft 7 in)
- Max. depth: 5.5 m (18 ft)
- Water volume: 1,620 hm^{3} (1,310,000 acre⋅ft)

== Lake Colhué Huapi ==
The name of this large water mirror comes from the Mapuche language Mapudungun. Colhué means "reddish or red place" and Huapí means "island". It is a reference to one of the many clay conformed islands of such lake. The lake was named in official Argentine cartography by explorer Francisco Moreno who reached the lake in 1876. Subsequent analysis have shown that Moreno appear to have mistaken it for the larger General Carrera Lake whom indigenous Tehuelches called Coluguape.

Colhué Huapi fills a shallow depression formed by strong eolean action over an area of fine clays. It is fed by the Falso Senguerr river, a sinuous branch of main Senguerr River. The lake coast is dominated by extensive wetlands mainly at its feeding zone. In contrast to its neighbour Musters (separated by a 12 kilometres (7.5 mi) wide and 695 metres (2,280 ft) high isthmus) Colhué has an average depth of 2 metres (6.6 ft) and high water turbidity due to suspended sediments deposited by constant wind.

It is considered an argilotrophic brackish water lake because of its high levels of inorganic sediments in suspension. As with lake Musters, and despite the high water opacity, Patagonian perch and silversides have large populations. Of high interest is the native big mouth perch (Percichthys colhuehuapensis) currently endangered by pressure of human-introduced foreign salmonidae.

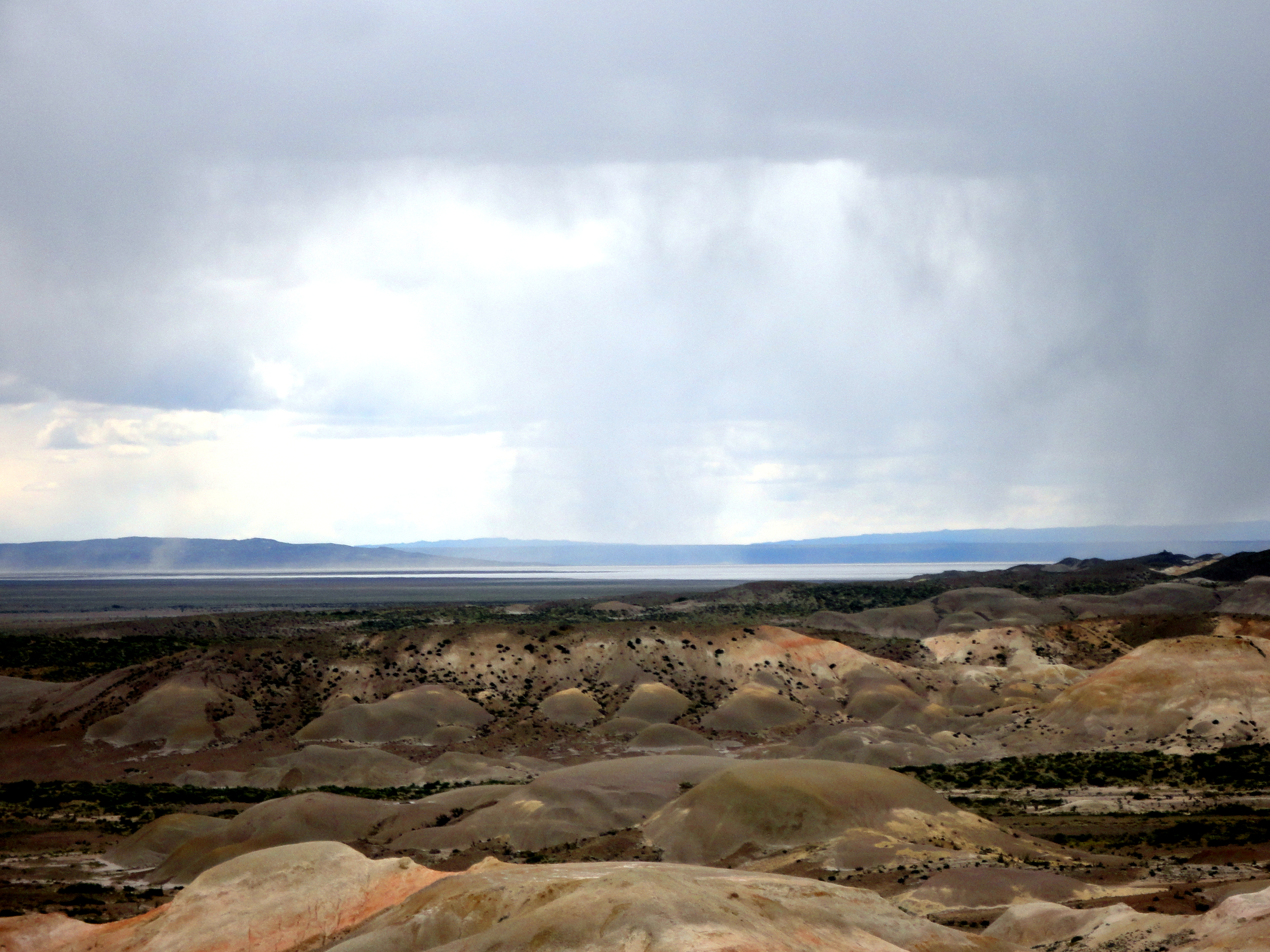
Lake Colhué Huapí

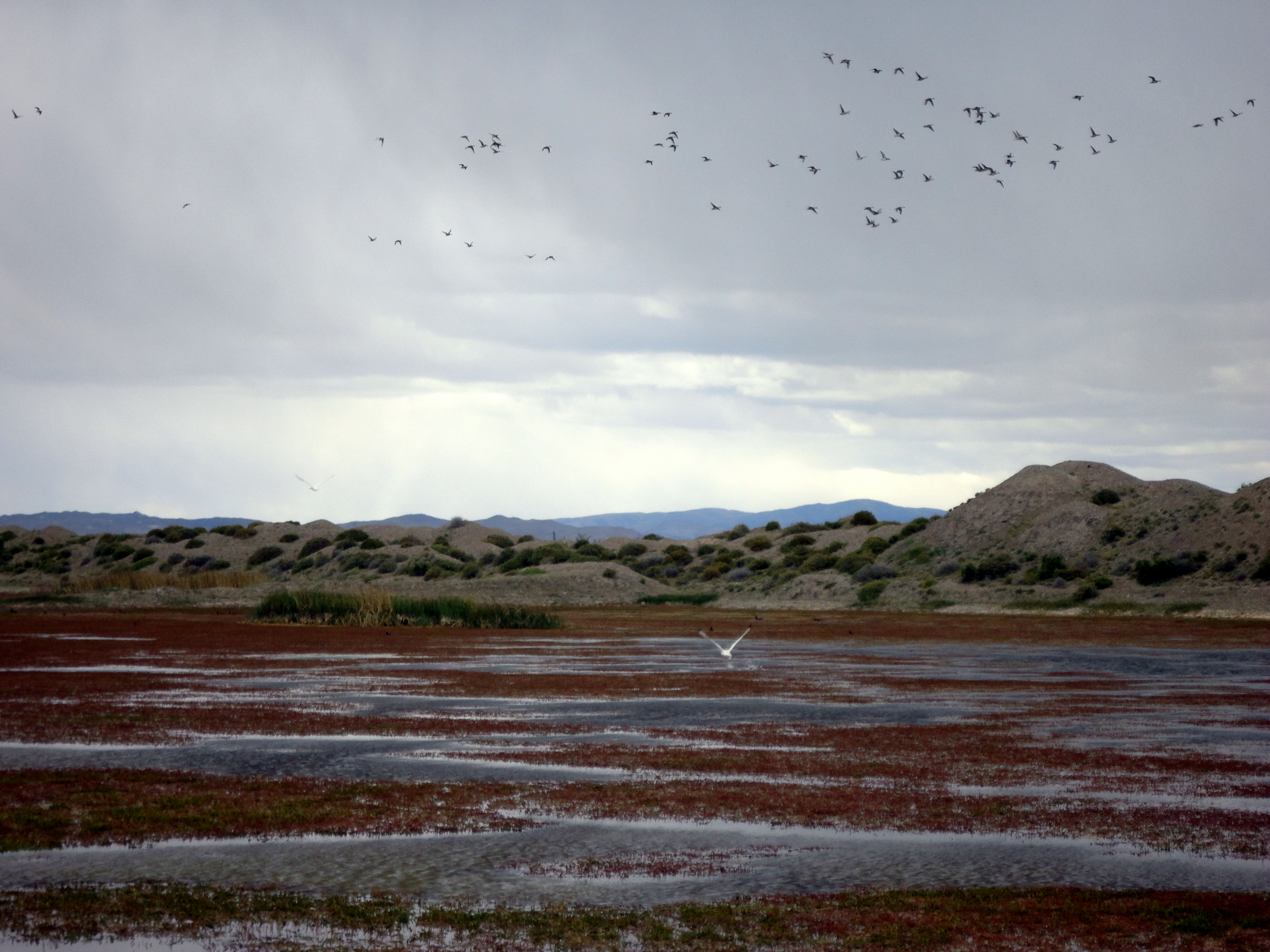
Fauna present at the Lake Colhué Huapí.

== Environmental concerns ==
Several water offtakes have been progressively placed at lake Musters for drinking water supply, as well as many diversions of the Senguerr river to feed oil extraction facilities in the nearby region. This complicated the already resented water balance of the whole system to the extent of near-collapse at Colhué Huapí, whose peripheral surface continuously retracts and dries. The hydrological equilibrium of the whole basin has been negative in the past seventy years. Currently these lakes' situation could be defined as compromised.
