= Valle de Sarmiento =

Agricultural valley and oasis in Chubut Province, Argentina

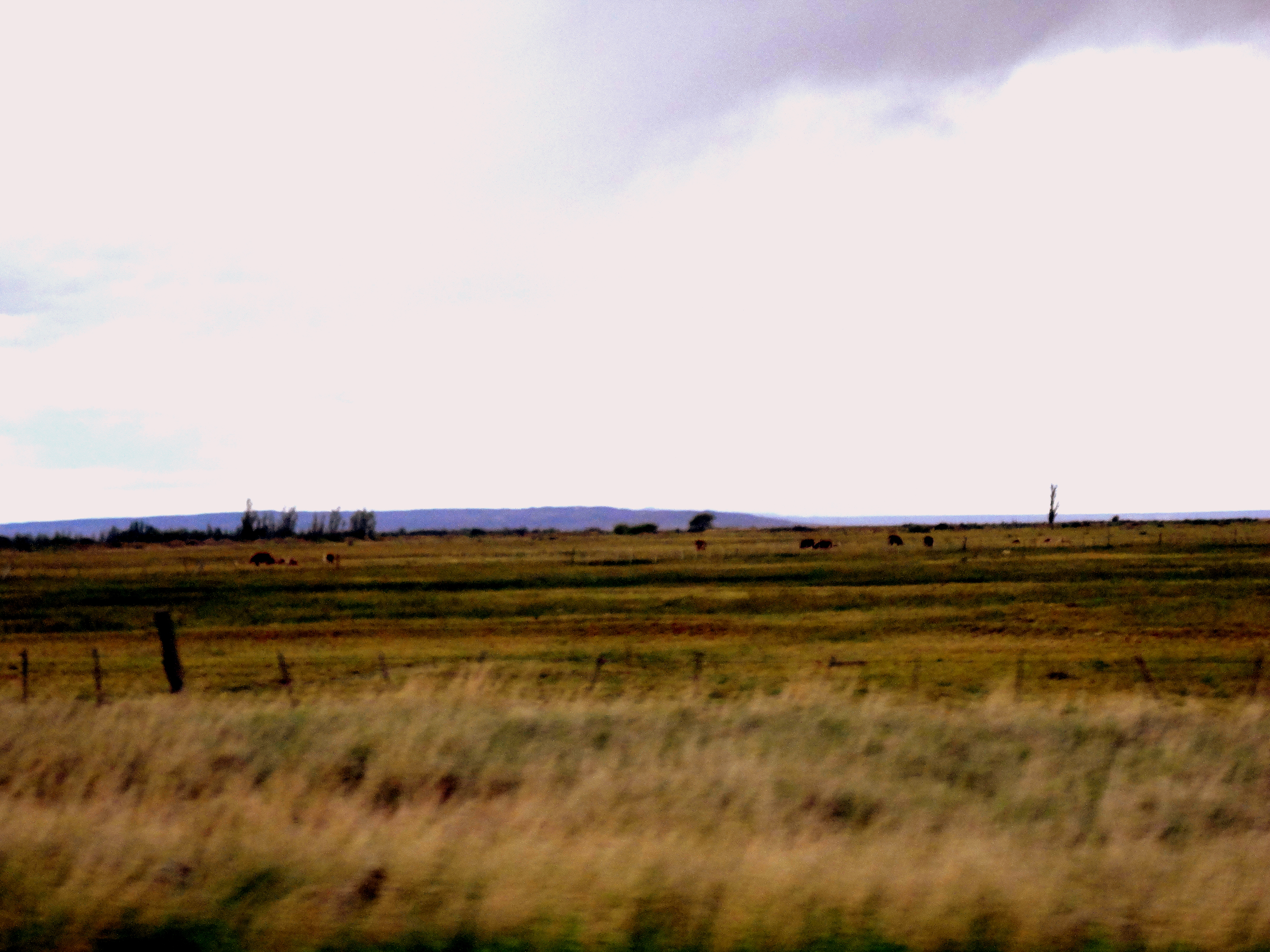
View of the Valle de Sarmiento entrance, looking east from the road. Note the extensive pastures and cattle.

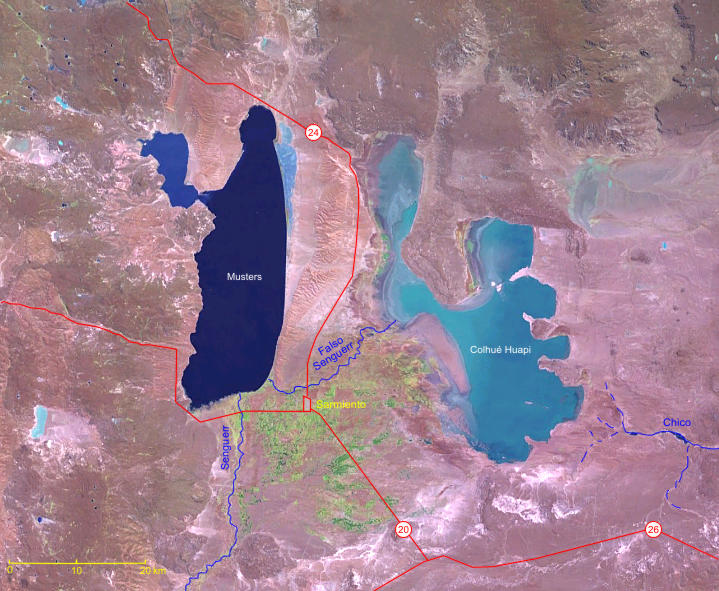
Satellite view of Musters and Colhué Huapi lakes, with the valley in the lower area (green color). At the bottom of the image, the Zanjón del Cerro Negro, the southernmost arm of the Senguer, is visible, dry and white at the time.

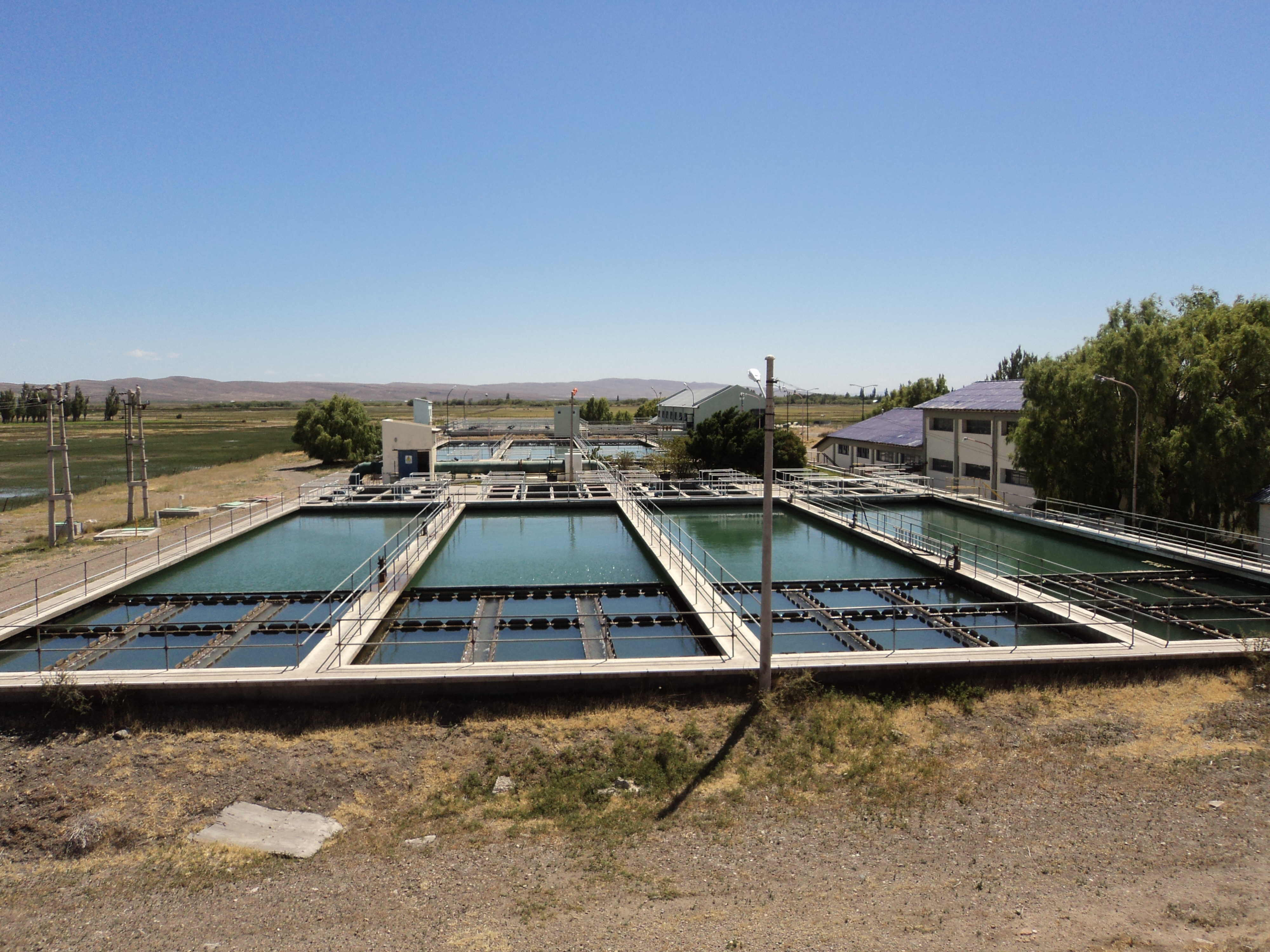
Sarmiento water treatment plant. Note the valley landscape in the background.

Valle de Sarmiento (or Sarmiento Valley, also known as the Valley of the Senguer River) is an irrigated agricultural valley spanning 42,000 ha located in the south-central part of Chubut Province, forming an oasis in the midst of the Patagonian Plateau, where the greatest temperature variations in Argentina are recorded. It is situated in the center of the Sarmiento Department, between Lake Musters and Lake Colhué Huapi, in the area known as the Gran Bajo de Sarmiento.

Its location was strategic, as it lies in an oasis area of the Patagonian Plateau, where an arid climate predominates, with annual precipitation below 200 mm. The local population was able to supply the growing population of Comodoro Rivadavia with food and raw materials via the Comodoro Rivadavia Railway. This ensured greater overall traffic than that on the Puerto Deseado to Colonia Las Heras branch and increased commerce for the area. The productive towns of Sarmiento and Colhué Huapi thrived, continuing to supply Comodoro Rivadavia.

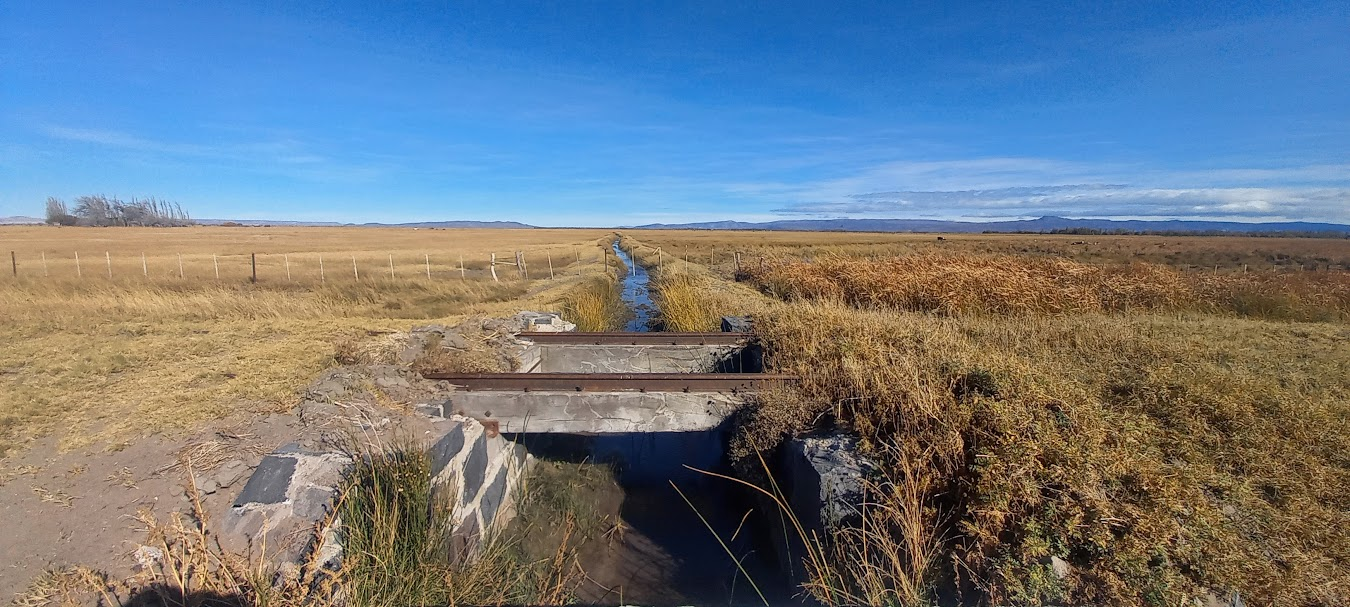
Old irrigation canal from the Senguer River passing through a railway culvert in the Colhué Huapi area.

The valley, south of Musters and Colhué Huapi lakes, is one of the southernmost irrigated oases in the world. Here, forage crops (mainly alfalfa), fruit trees, and vegetables are cultivated.

== History ==
The area was already known and visited by the Tehuelche indigenous people. In 1876, the site was visited by Francisco Pascasio Moreno, who named the lake to the west of the valley Musters. In 1885, the area was explored by the Chubut Rifles.

In 1896, Francisco Pietrobelli submitted a request to Governor Alejandro Conesa for the concession of two unexplored sections in the southern territory, specifically south of Colhué Huapi Lake, to establish an agricultural colony. The proposal was supported by 183 signatures, mostly from immigrants and descendants of Welsh and Italian immigrants.

On January 5, 1897, Pietrobelli set out from Rawson with indigenous people and immigrants (both Welsh and Italians) to explore the interior of Chubut territory. During the journey, on June 27, the National Government granted the land by decree to establish a colony named Ideal, later renamed Sarmiento in honor of the educator and president from San Juan, Domingo Faustino Sarmiento.

Initially, it was called "Valle Ideal" due to its agricultural and livestock conditions.

In November 1897, the town of Colonia Sarmiento was founded. However, the colony faced supply issues, as the nearest port, Camarones, was far away. This led to the founding of Comodoro Rivadavia a few years later.

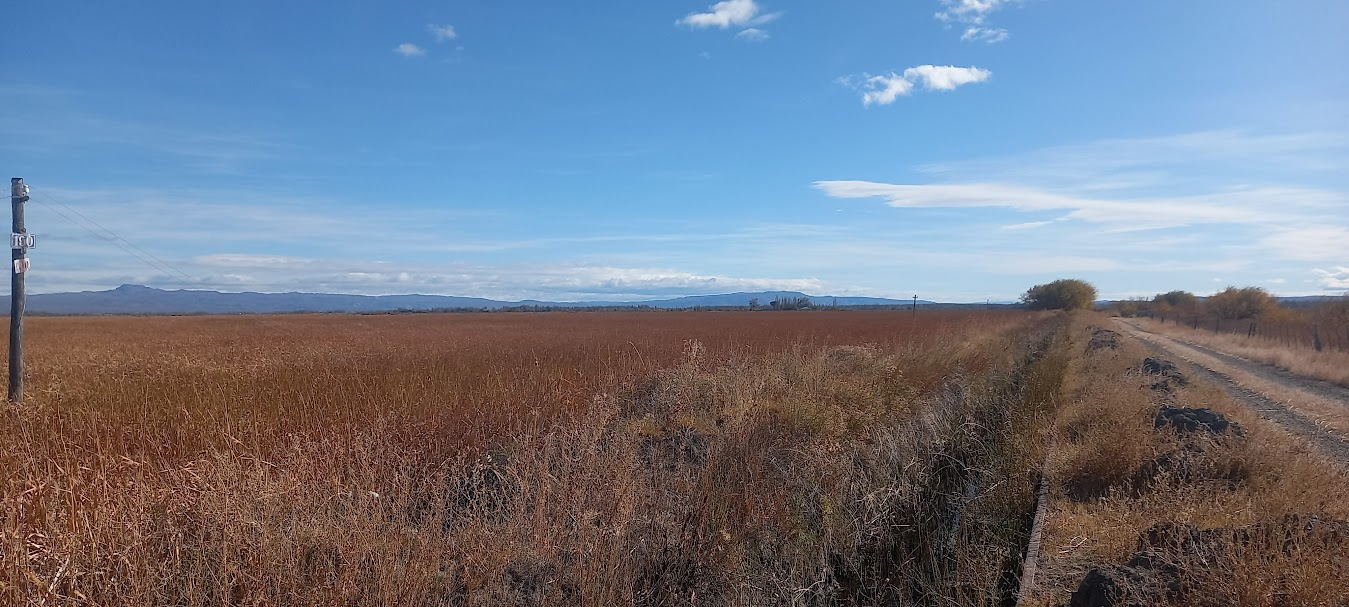
Extensive prairie between Colhué Huapi and Sarmiento. This point is marked as Km 190 on the old telegraph-telephone post, indicating significant kilometer points of the railway.

Since 1914, the area was served by the Comodoro Rivadavia Railway, which accelerated development with stations like Sarmiento, Colhué Huapi, Enrique Hermitte, and Valle Hermoso to facilitate trade and other activities. The railway played a key role in transporting agricultural products to the oil city of Comodoro Rivadavia, meeting its demand for a long time. The railway declined in the 1970s and was soon discontinued in the area under claims of unprofitability.

Today, road transport has replaced the railway, increasing costs. Currently, the valley spans 42,000 hectares across 150 agricultural operations.

== Characteristics ==
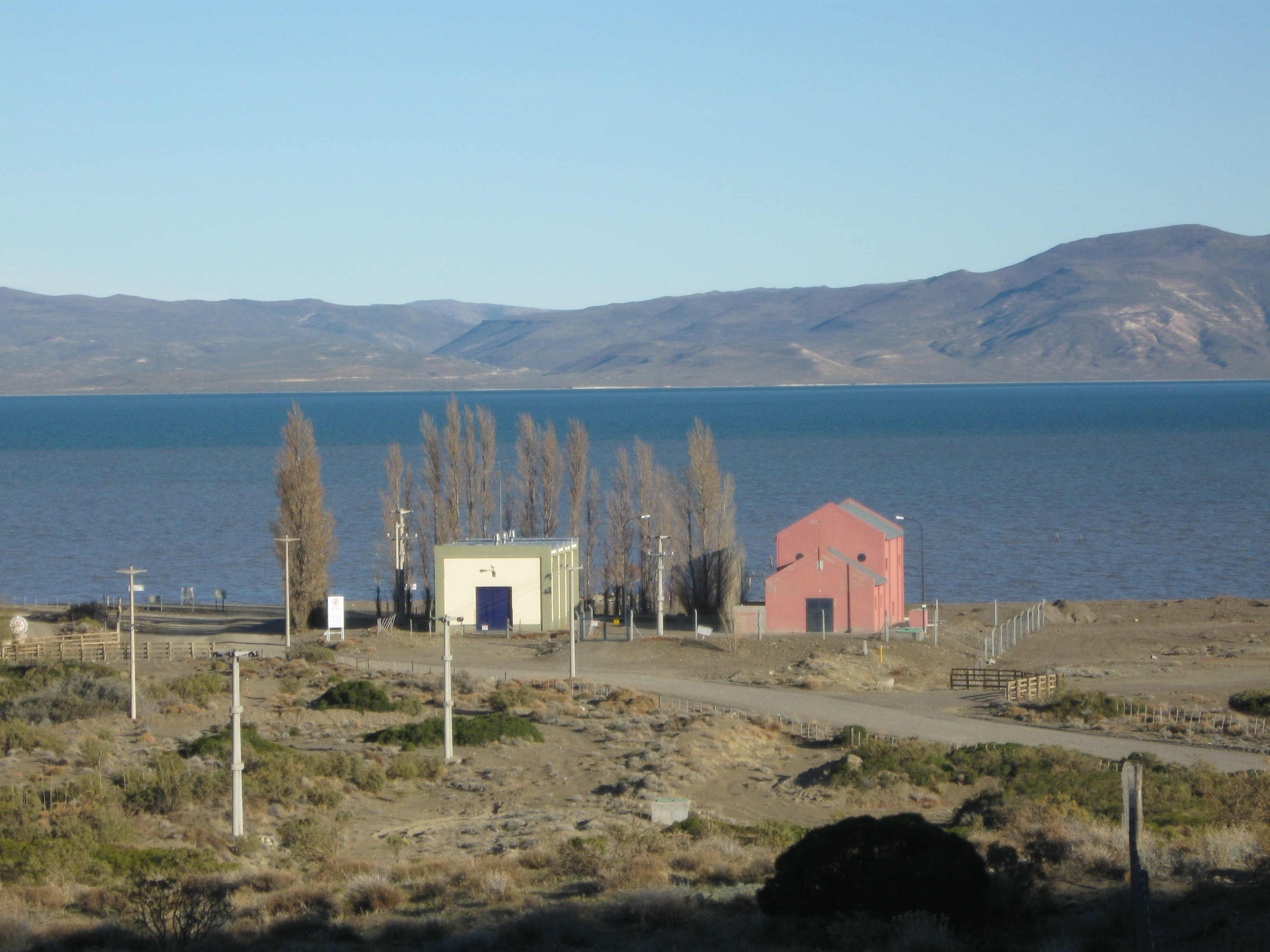
Intakes of the Lago Musters Aqueduct.

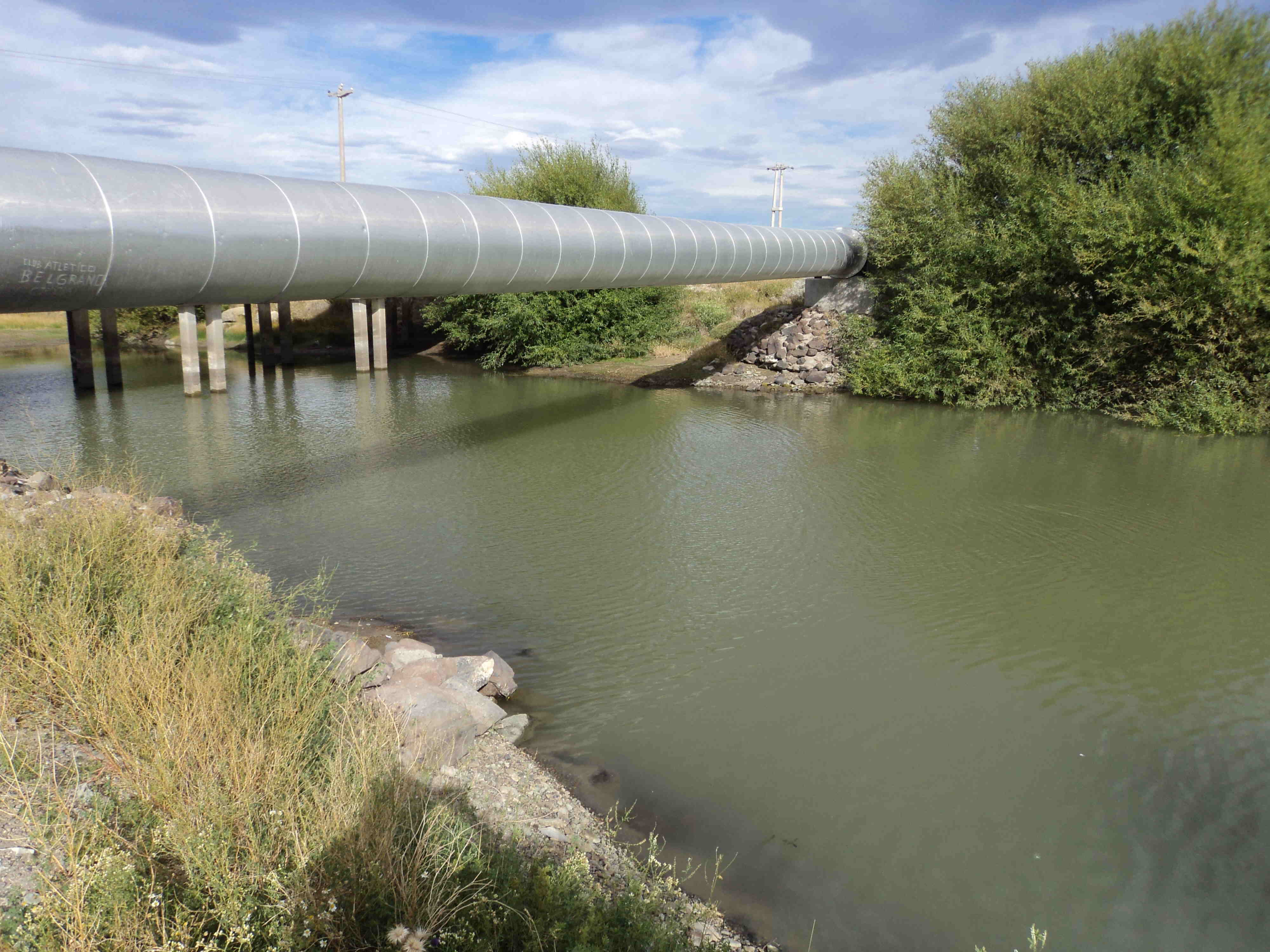
View of the Falso Senguerr.

The valley forms an alluvial and aeolian plain, located between Musters and Colhué Huapi lakes. To the west lies the final course of the Senguerr River, and to the north, the meandering watercourse called Falso Senguerr, which connects both lakes. The Senguerr River has several branches in this area, including the Zanjón del Cerro Negro.

The area experiences frequent frosts due to polar air influence, with up to 60 or more frost days, posing a severe restriction on growing cold-sensitive seasonal crops. However, this condition favors the cultivation of cryophilic crops, which require a certain amount of cold hours to grow and develop normally during their vegetative and reproductive cycles (e.g., pome and stone fruits).

Intake structures have been built to supply drinking water aqueducts from Musters Lake (generally to Comodoro Rivadavia) and irrigation canals for local cultivation.

Currently, few farms are inhabited and productive. The few residents remaining in the southern valley are direct descendants of the first settlers. The decline in production is due to 95% of farms using flood irrigation, which affects the Senguer River's flow and its branches. As a result, nearly 8,000 hectares irrigated by old canals have formed natural wetlands in native fields, overwatered even for pasture yields. Permanent flooding produces reeds and other marsh plants, resulting in salinized and degraded soil incapable of production. The total loss from poor water management is estimated at 10,000 hectares. However, 2,700 hectares in Valle de Sarmiento are now systematized, with producers growing alfalfa and pastures for livestock and a small area irrigated by drip systems. The water crisis led the government to plan with producers to level fields, systematize irrigation, and avoid flood irrigation. In Valle de Sarmiento, up to 80% of the Senguer's water is used for agriculture.

As of 2012, the valley's total production includes:

Agricultural production in Valle de Sarmiento
Hectares	Crop	Percentage of area	Applied technology	Production ha/ton	Market destination
2144	Polyphytic pastures	18.38%	Strip irrigation	2.00	Local and self-consumption
300	Alfalfa	2.57%	"	3.00	"
16	Maize Silage	0.14%	Furrow	2.80	Local, national, and self-consumption
27	Raspberry	0.23%	"	4.00	Local and self-consumption
159	Cherry	1.36%	Pressurized/Furrow	9.8	Local, national, self-consumption, and international
7	Grape	0.06%	Furrow	3.50	Local and self-consumption
5	Tomato	0.04%	"	7.50	"
5	Potato	0.04%	"	12.00	"
5	Lettuce	0.04%	"	5.00	"
9,000	Mallín	77.13%	Flood irrigation		Self-consumption

== Economy ==
The main economic activity in the valley is agriculture (consisting of 150 operations) and livestock farming. Among the main crops are alfalfa, vegetables, and soft fruits (cherries, raspberries, etc.).

Most production meets local demand. Livestock activities include raising sheep and cattle. Additionally, dairy production was significant around 1985 (and since 2010), with cheese and yogurt produced in Sarmiento. Some farms engage in agrotourism.

The valley is home to the Frutos del Lago estate, which produces cherries, apricots, and peaches, as well as wine, making it the southernmost winery in the world.

The valley and its surroundings form part of the San Jorge Gulf Basin, a significant oil and gas basin accounting for nearly 40% of the province's total production. Tourism is also an economic activity in the valley.

Since March 2014, a Chinese investor group has studied expanding irrigation areas in the Lower Chubut River Valley, Valle de Sarmiento, and 16 de Octubre in Trevelin. Governor Martín Buzzi mentioned the Intermediate Terrace project for Valle de Sarmiento, deemed feasible, with a total investment of around $100 million alongside similar projects.

Since 2011, production has progressively shifted toward viticulture, making the valley the southernmost wine-producing region in the world. The first entrepreneur, Alejandro Bulgheroni, allocated 1,300 hectares to the project of the southernmost winery. Initial grape varieties were Pinot Noir and Chardonnay, later incorporating Merlot, Pinot Gris, Gewürztraminer, Riesling, Torrontés, and Malbec. The first vinification took place in 2017. In 2023, the National Institute of Viticulture recognized the valley as a registered wine-producing area.
