= Stileman =

Stileman is a surname. Notable people with this surname include:

- Charles Stileman (1863–1925), British clergyman
- Cyril Stileman (1879–1943), English civil engineer and cricketer
- Francis Croughton Stileman (1824–1889), partner of John Robinson McClean in the firm of McClean & Stileman
- Frederic Stileman (1882–1949), English merchant and cricketer
- Harry Stileman (1860–1938), British navy officer
- Leonard Stileman-Gibbard (1856–1939), English cricketer

== See also ==
- Stillman (disambiguation)
