= Stillman =

Stillman may refer to:

- Stillman (surname)
- Stillman (given name)
- Stillman, Michigan
- Stillman College, Alabama
- Stillman Valley, Illinois
  - Stillman's Run Battle Site
- W. Paul Stillman School of Business, Seton Hall University

== See also ==
- Stileman
