= Buen Pasto =

Coordinates: 45°05′S 69°28′W

- Municipality and village
- Interactive map of Buen Pasto
- Country: Argentina
- Province: Chubut Province
- Department: Sarmiento Department, Chubut

Government
  - Intendant: Walter Jara
- Time zone: UTC−3 (ART)
- Climate: BWk

Buen Pasto is a village and municipality in Chubut Province in southern Argentina.
