= Charles Evan-Thomas =

Welsh cricketer and Royal Navy officer

Personal information
- Full name: Charles Marmaduke Evan-Thomas
- Born: 5 November 1897; Builth Wells, Brecknockshire, Wales
- Died: 28 March 1953 (aged 55); Llanwrtyd Wells, Brecknockshire, Wales
- Batting: Unknown
- Bowling: Unknown-arm medium-fast
- Relatives: Cyril Stileman (brother-in-law)

Domestic team information
- Years: Team
- 1929: Marylebone Cricket Club

Career statistics
Competition	First-class
Matches	3
Runs scored	45
Batting average	7.50
100s/50s	–/–
Top score	19
Balls bowled	72
Wickets	1
Bowling average	59.00
5 wickets in innings	–
10 wickets in match	–
Best bowling	1/16
Catches/stumpings	1/–
- Source: Cricinfo, 22 December 2019

Charles Marmaduke Evan-Thomas JP (5 November 1897 – 28 March 1953) was a Welsh first-class cricketer and Royal Navy officer.

The son of Algernon Ham Evan-Thomas and Lillian Watson Lee, he was born in November 1897 on the family estate at Builth Wells, Brecknockshire. He attended the Royal Naval College, Osborne from where he graduated into the Royal Navy. He served during the First World War, after which he made his debut in first-class cricket for the Royal Navy Cricket Club, making two first-class appearances in 1919 and 1920 against Cambridge University at Fenner's. He later made a third appearance in first-class cricket for the Marylebone Cricket Club against the Royal Navy at Chatham in 1929. He ended his naval career as a commander, later becoming a justice of the peace. Evan-Thomas died in March 1953 at Llanwrtyd Wells, Brecknockshire. His uncle was Admiral Sir Hugh Evan-Thomas. His brother-in-law, Cyril Stileman, also played first-class cricket.
