= Burney's Academy =

Preparatory school in Gosport, England

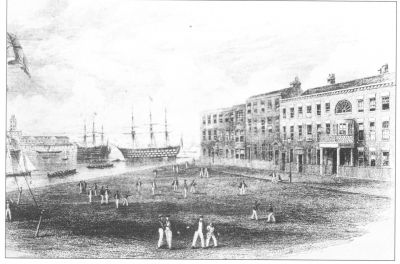
Burney's Academy at Gosport

Dr. Burney's Academy, founded 1791 by William Burney (1762 – December 1832), was a preparatory school or "crammer" in Gosport, Hampshire, England, whose aim was to prepare young men for the Royal Navy's entrance examinations and a naval career, though many of its students went on to Army or civilian careers.

== History ==
On the death of Burney, his son Henry took over running of the school, followed by Henry's brother Edward (c.1817-1888), then William's grandson the Rev. Edward Amyatt Amyatt Burney, who became Rector of Rowner, to the north-west of Gosport (1848–1920). The school was sold in 1889. At some time before 1891 it received patronage of Queen Victoria, Prince Albert, the Prince of Wales and the Duke of Connaught, and was renamed the Royal Academy. The Rev. F. G. Johnson was Head Master from 1888 until the school closed in 1904.

== Notable alumni ==
- Thomas Murray-Prior (1819–1892)
- John Cowans (1862–1921), Quartermaster-General to the Forces
- Charles Cooper Penrose Fitzgerald (1841–1921)
- Alexander Forbes-Leith, 1st Baron Leith of Fyvie (1847–1925)
- Oliver Young (1855–1908)
- David Beatty, 1st Earl Beatty (1871–1936)
- George Digby Morant (1837–1921)
- George Chaworth Musters
- Frederick G. Guggisberg
- Vice-admiral Henry John Rous (1795 –1877)
- Martin Snape (1852–1930), painter
- Marshal-Admiral Tōgō Heihachirō, OM, GCVO (1848-1934), Japanese navy officer
- George Francis Lyon DCL (1795-1833)
- Morgan Lindsay (1857–1935), Welsh soldier and racehorse trainer
- Cyril Stileman (1879–1943), civil engineer and cricketer

== See also ==
- Stubbington House School
- Eastman's Royal Naval Academy
