= Lake Musters =

Lake in the central Patagonian region of Argentina

Lago Musters
- Otrón
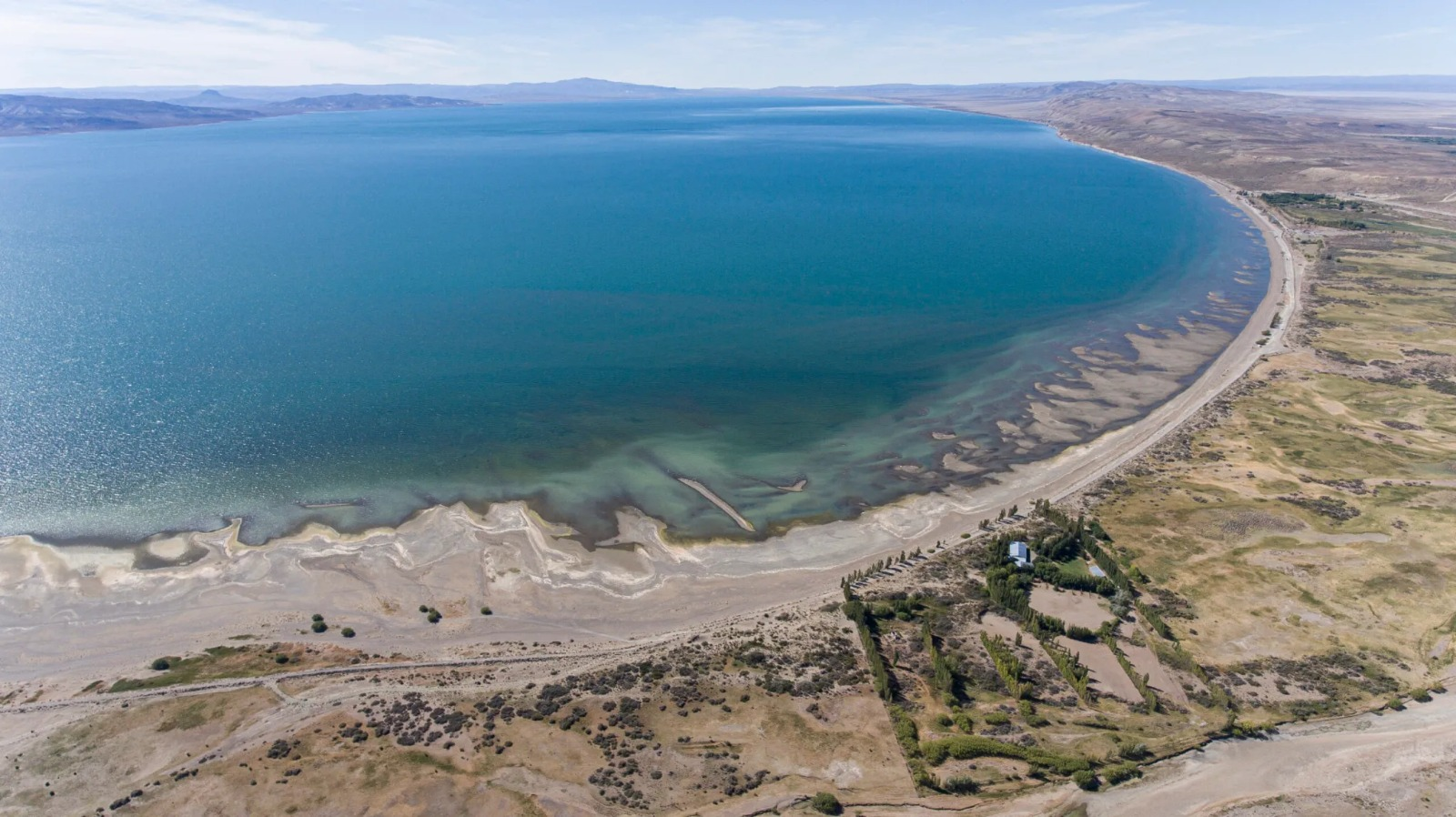
- Interactive map of Lago Musters
- Coordinates: 45°25′S 69°11′W
- Part of: Now endorheic, exceptionally by the Chico River
- Primary inflows: Senguerr River
- Primary outflows: Endorheic
- Surface area: 342 km^{2} (132 sq mi)
- Average depth: 15 m (49 ft)
- Max. depth: 38.5 m (126 ft)
- Water volume: 8.28 km^{3} (2 mi^{3})
- Surface elevation: 271 m (889 ft)
- Settlements: Colonia Sarmiento

Lake Musters is located in the central Patagonian region of the Argentina, south of the province of Chubut, and together with Lake Colhué Huapi, it forms the terminal phase of the current endorheic basin of the Senguerr River. Both lakes are located in the Valle de Sarmiento.

Their water is a source of drinking water to the towns of Comodoro Rivadavia, Colonia Sarmiento, Rada Tilly and Caleta Olivia. Sport and commercial fishing is also practised in its waters.

== Toponymy ==
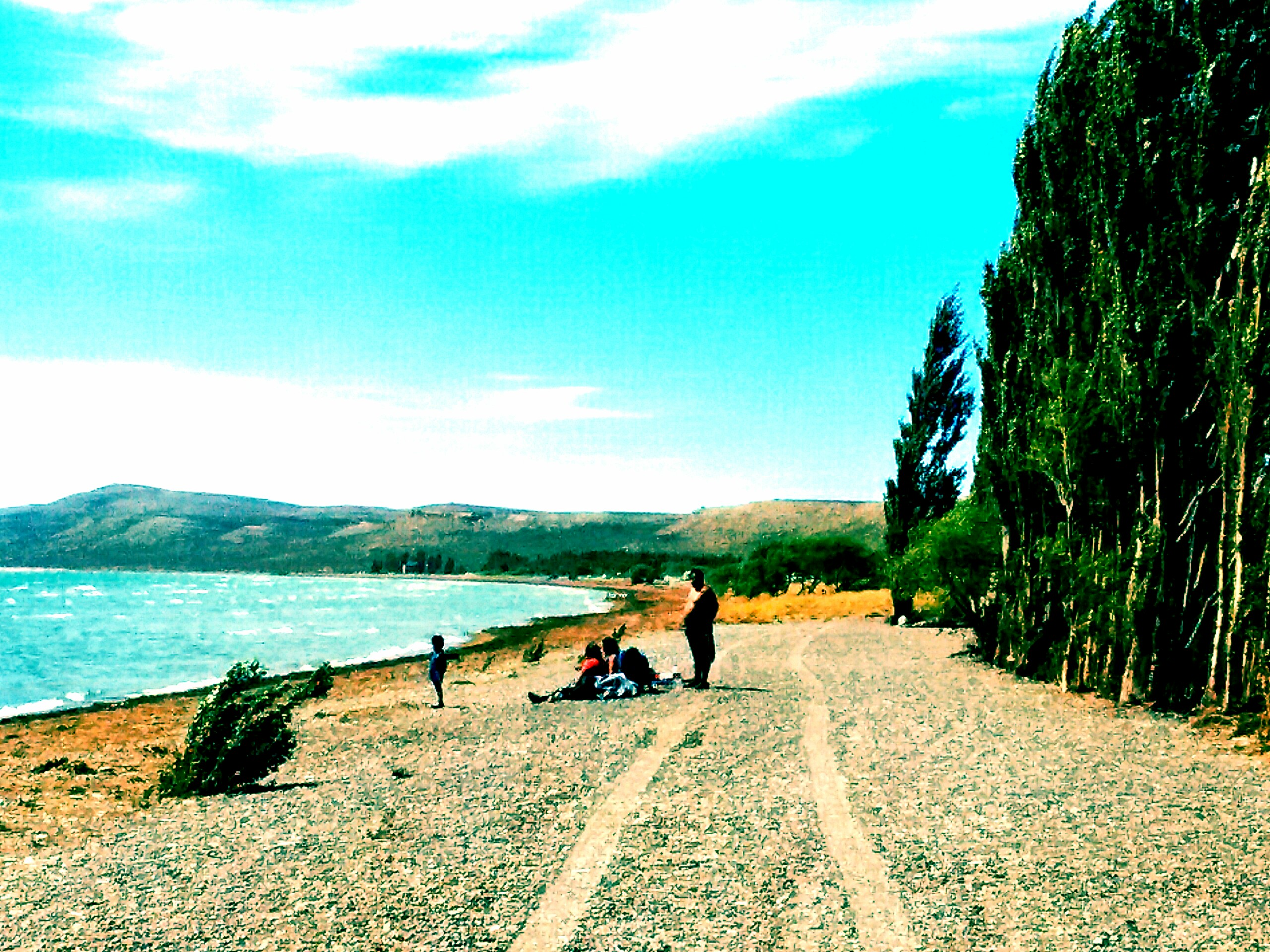
Extensive beach with leafy groves

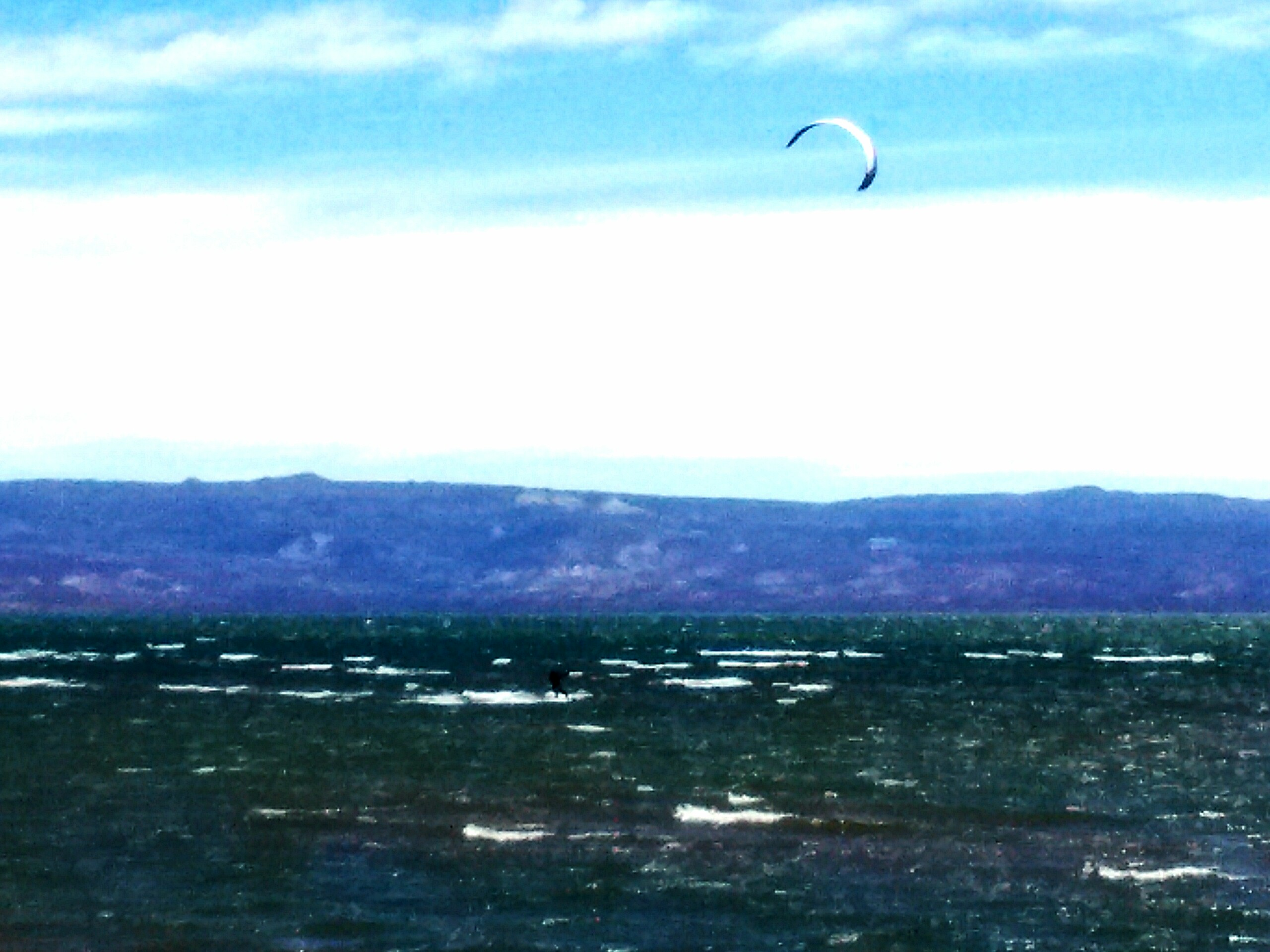
Windsurfing in the lake

This large body of water was called ‘Otrón’ by the former inhabitants of the Chonik (Tehuelche) ethnic group, probably belonging to the Aonikenk (southern Tehuelche).

The naturalist and geographer Francisco Pascasio Moreno was apparently unaware of this original toponym, and on an exploration in the spring of 1876 he stopped at the lower part of the Colhué Huapi and Otrón lakes, which he named Musters in honour of the English sailor and globetrotter, who in 1869 had passed near the place, although without getting to know it, on a long expedition of ten months and 2,700 km.

On that adventure, George Chaworth Musters accompanied Tehuelche groups of the chiefs Orkeke and Casimiro Biguá in parleys with Mapuche tribes. Two years later, Musters published a travelogue in London called Life among the Patagonians, in which he depicted the feared Patagonian Indians as friendly beings with whom one could live in their tolderías and cordially share a months-long journey.

In Moreno's words, this body of water is

...an interesting lake which has not been named by those who have visited it ...and I have given it the name of Lake Musters on my map, in honour of the distinguished traveller who crossed Patagonia from end to end and who well deserves this remembrance. In his homage I hope that those who have seen it for the first time will adopt and keep the name I have allowed myself to apply to it.

== Hydrological considerations ==
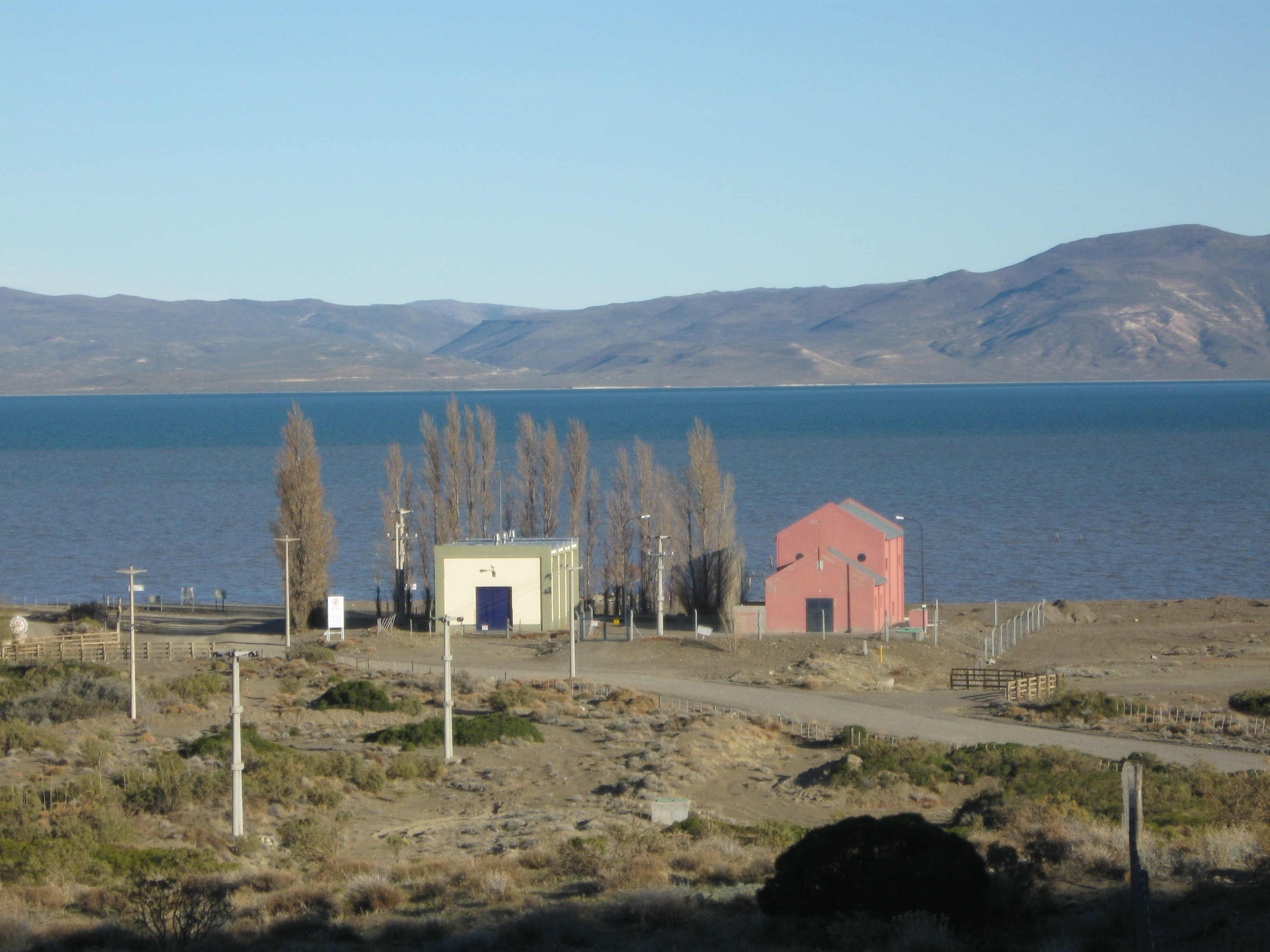
Water intakes, corresponding to the Lake Musters Aqueduct

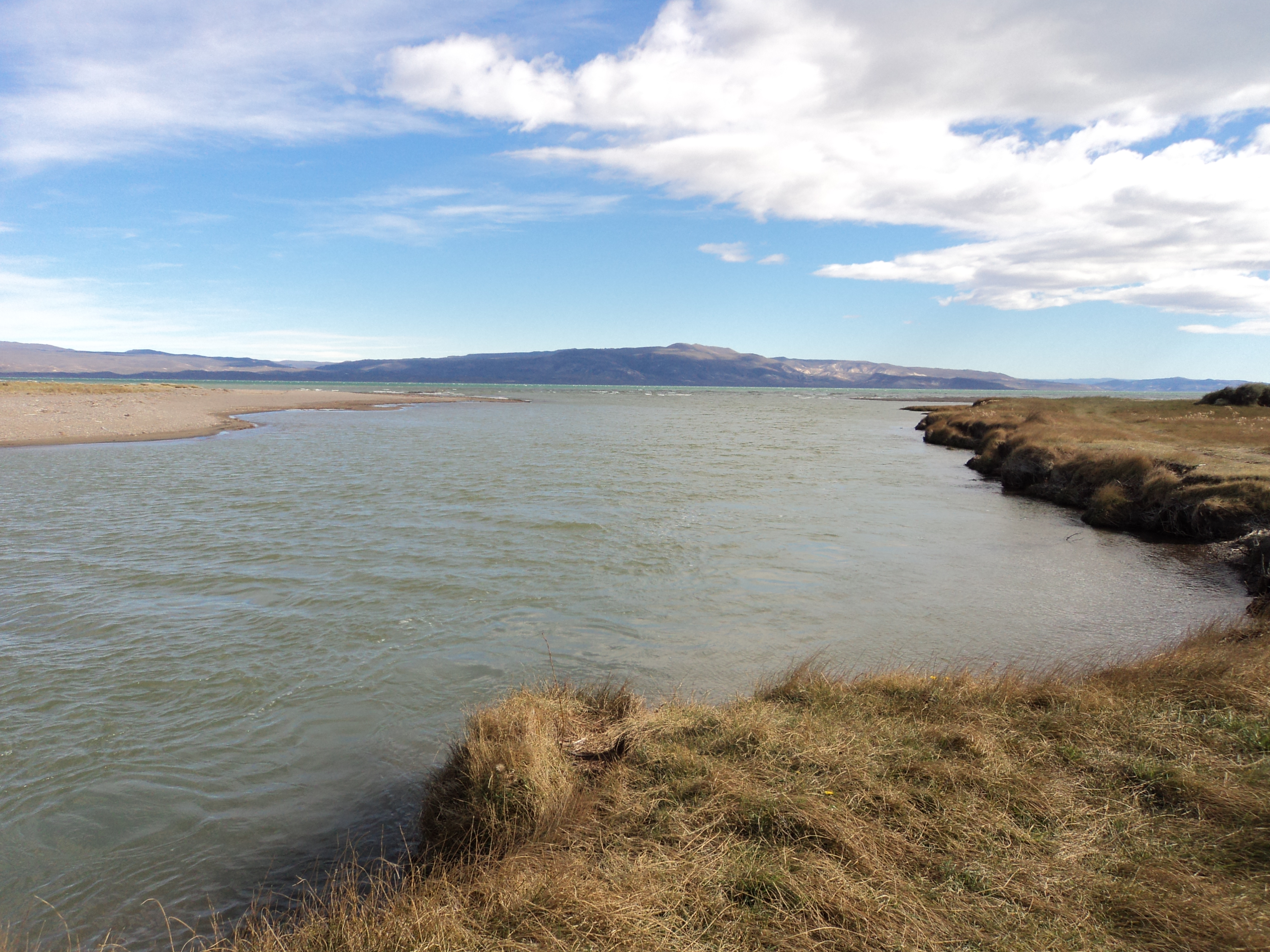
Outlet of the Senguerr River into the lake

In the past it formed a primitive lake with its neighbouring Lake Colhué Huapi. The former body of water was called Paleolake Sarmiento and its level reached 326 metres above sea level (60 metres above the current level of Lake Musters). Subsequently, it descended and it is estimated that before 1600 BC the lakes were still connected and the bottom of the lower Sarmiento was almost entirely occupied by water. By 1500 BC the lakes would have reached a similar level to today and separated.

Lake Musters occupies a depression structurally originated at the end of the Cretaceous in the middle of the central Patagonian plateau. Its only tributary is the Senguerr River, which in turn is fed by Andean meltwater regulated at its headwaters by the Lake Fontana and Lake La Plata. After travelling 350 km from these mountain slopes through the central plateau of the province of Chubut, this river brings an average annual flow of 54 m^{3}/s to the entire lower Sarmiento. In the past, this river contributed more water to the Colhué Huapi, but since the construction of the Sarmiento coastal defence, the water flow towards this lake has been modified.

Upon entering this alluvial and eolian plain, the Senguerr subdivides into numerous secondary branches (generally dry) in the shape of a fan, oriented towards the northeast. Its main channel flows towards the tectonic trench of Lake Musters, entering it on its southern shore, and shortly before reaching it, it subdivides again and also flows into Lake Colhué Huapi, located a few kilometres to the east.

This branch of the river that connects both lakes has been called Falso Senguerr, and its meandering course passes to the north of the locality of Colonia Sarmiento. The southernmost branch of the River Senguer is the Cerro Negro ditch. It also forms meanders and lagoons, but reaches Lake Colhué Huapi only during extraordinary floods.

Lake Musters has a flat and marshy southern shore. In this sector, its waters are conditionally contained by a barrier of rocks and sand up to 3m high, formed by waves and wind action. This does not prevent part of the water from seeping out, mainly towards the Falso Senguerr riverbed. The remaining periphery of its shores is higher and drier, providing a safe containment. It is separated from Lake Colhué Huapi by an isthmus of land about 12 km wide and 695 m above sea level.

Although these two great lakes of the Patagonian plateau present notorious geo-hydrological differences between them, their joint study is unavoidable, since they are part of the same chained water system. The Musters is of tectonic origin. It has an average depth of 15 m, which gives a deep blue appearance to the colouring of its waters. It can be considered a mesotrophic lake, both in terms of nutrient and chlorophyll levels and algal biomass (up to 5.29 g/m^{3}).

Its waters are clear and its homogeneous perimeter has no notable features, except for a gigantic bay contained between the Negra and Bava peninsulas. Its size is relatively shallow and of homogeneous depth. Along its eastern shore it connects with the La Flecha lagoon: low, elongated and with blurred edges, as compromised as its sister lakes by drought.

== Tourism ==
The lake has two different sectors: the western one, very close to Sarmiento, and the eastern one, next to National Route 40. Both sectors have beaches that attract bathers, water sportsmen and campers from Sarmiento and neighbouring towns. However, both sectors have respectable depths and are susceptible to generate big waves during wind storms. That is why over the years several visitors have drowned because they underestimated the swell and depth. The west east coast is the most developed and has a pier and a poplar grove, ideal for camping.

== Fish fauna ==
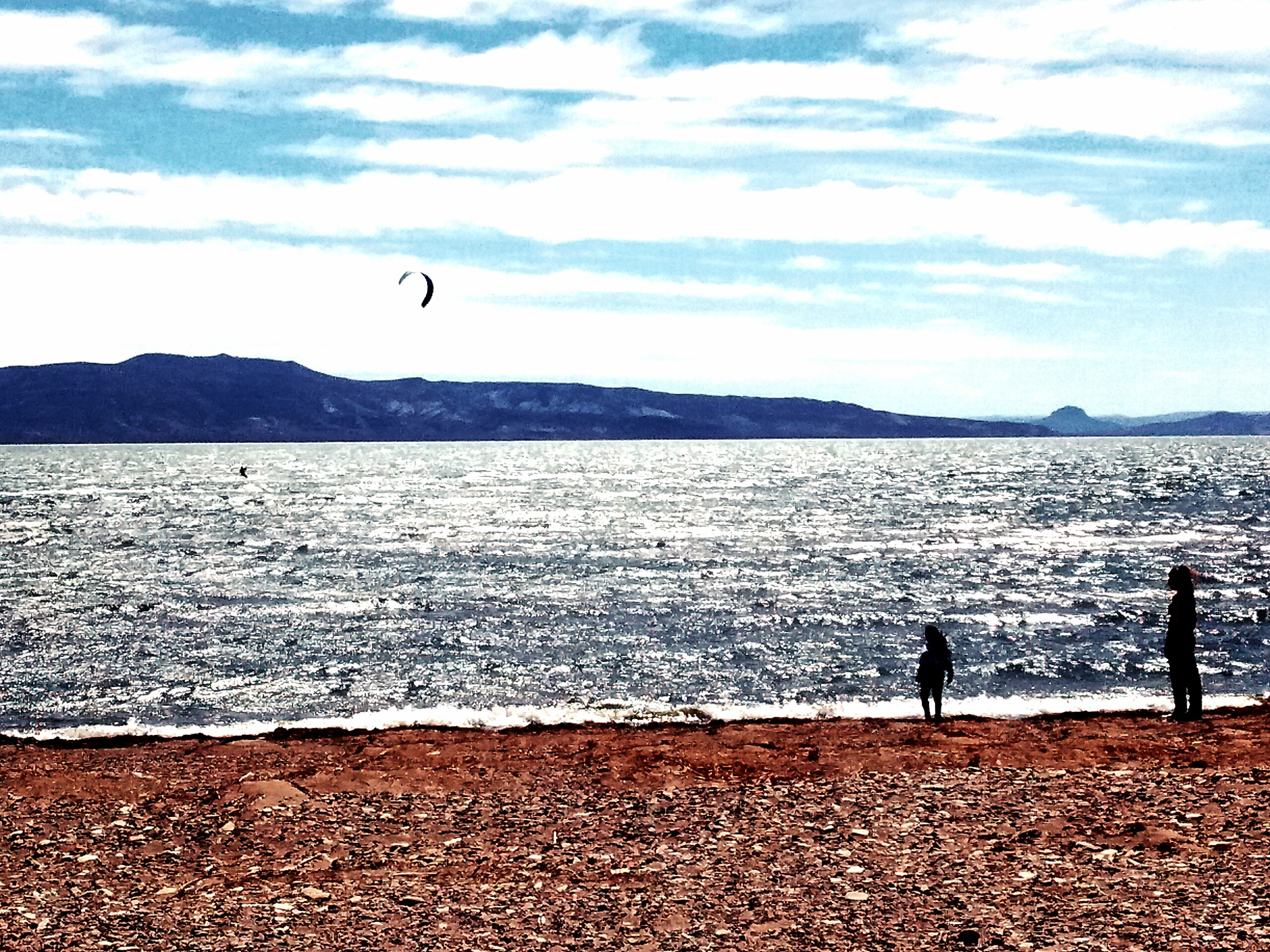
Aerial sport on Muster

Lake Musters has an abundant aquatic fauna composed mainly of perch (Percichthys trucha) and Patagonian silversides (Odontesthes microlepidotus). Likewise, as in almost all Patagonian lakes, exotic salmonids have been introduced, and the fontinalis or brook trout (Salvelinus fontinalis), rainbow trout (Oncorhynchus mykiss) and, to a lesser extent, brown trout (Salmo fario) have become very popular.

== Environmental status ==
Lake Musters is naturally subject to a severe evaporation process, both by wind and solar radiation. In addition, under normal conditions, part of its water volume infiltrates, increasing the flow of the Falso Senguer branch, which carries these contributions towards the Lake Colhué Huapi, where the evaporation process is repeated with greater intensity.

As a result of several human interventions in this basin, intake works have been carried out to feed drinking water aqueducts from Lake Musters, and irrigation canalisations and transfer of large volumes of water from the Senguer River to the secondary phase exploitation of the numerous oil wells in the region. All this aggravated the already compromised hydraulic balance of the system to the limits of near collapse. There is therefore an increasing decrease in the historical levels of the Lake Musters, and an accelerated process of retraction and drying up in the Colhué Huapi and its periphery.

In the past, excessive floods and flows into the Colhué Huapi reached the mouth of the Chico River, whose headwaters are located at the south-eastern end of the lake's flood zone. Thus, through the long course of the Chico River to the northeast, the discharge occasionally reached its mouth at the Chubut River. This intermittent natural regulating process last occurred in 1939, and since then the Chico River has been a dry riverbed.

The lake is essential for the surrounding towns by supplying them with water. Thus, Sarmiento, Rada Tilly, Caleta Olivia and Comodoro Rivadavia are supplied by the same water intake, drinking water treatment plant and aqueduct. The first great aqueduct that connected the lake with the Comodoro Rivadavia Metropolitan Area was planned in 1959 in view of the great shortage of vital liquid in the oil city and was completed in 1966. Since then, the lake has become very important in providing water to a large population.

=== Drought ===
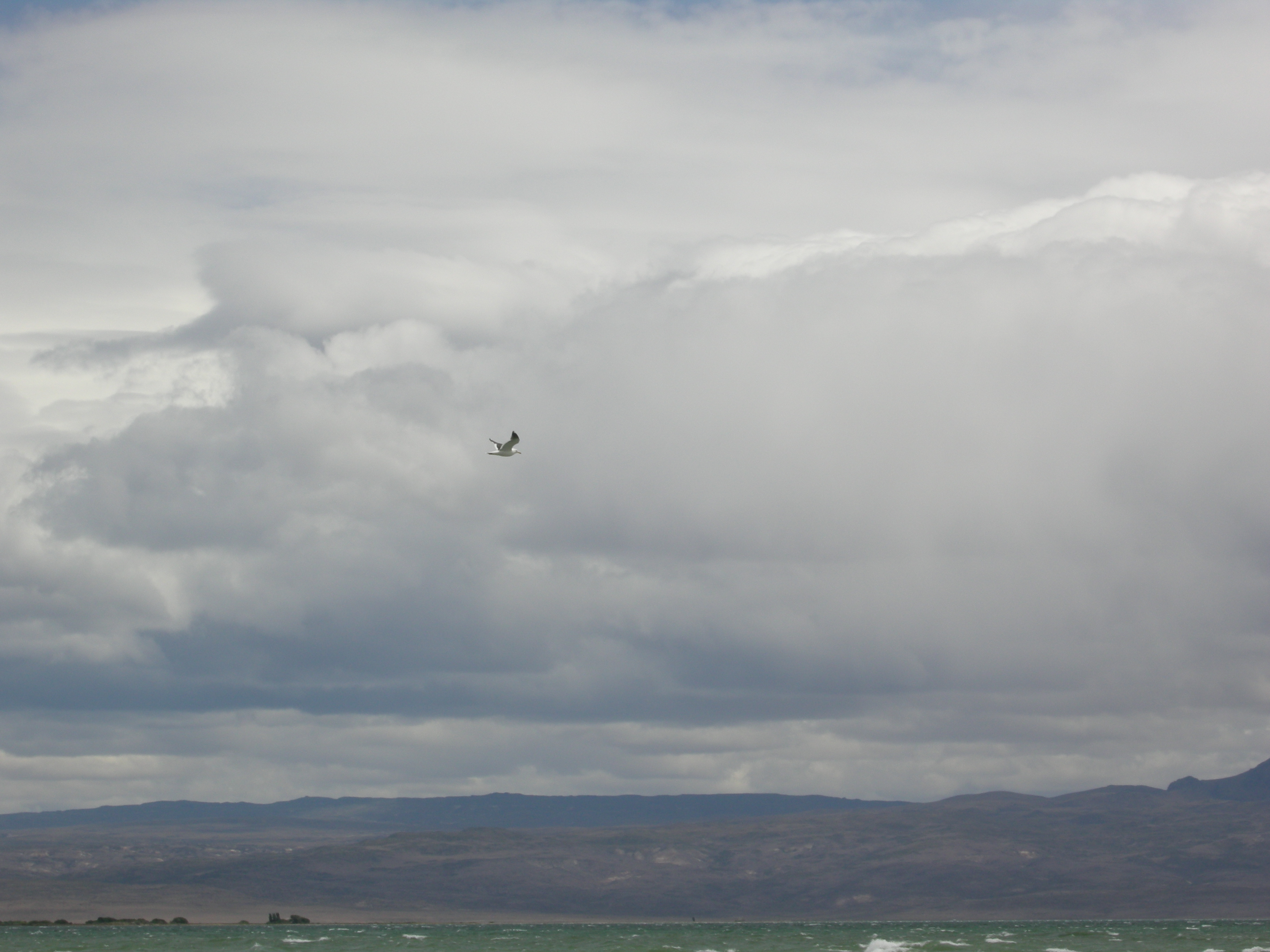
Larus dominicanus flying over Lake Musters, near Sarmiento (Chubut province, Argentina)

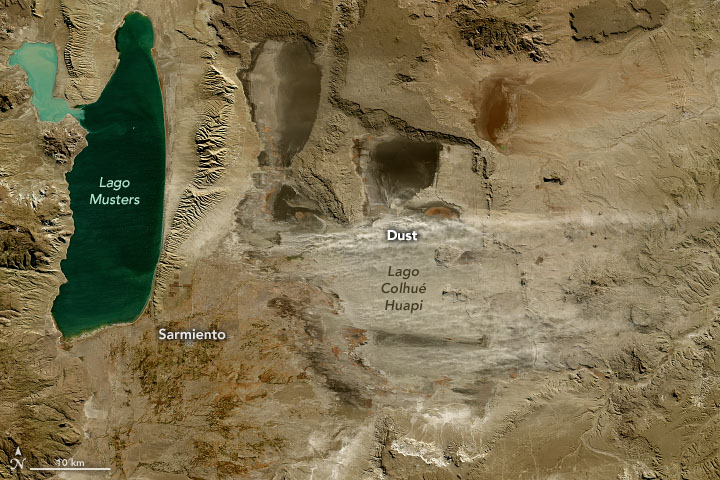
Image taken in 2021 by NASA. The Colhué Huapi completely dry and the Musters with a low level and many receding shores.

The water balance of this basin has been negative for the last seventy years. The current situation could be defined as highly compromised, and constitutes the main environmental threat to maintain the precarious hydro-biological balance of the system.

The lake is affected by the drought of the 2000s. The main factors contributing to the gradual disappearance of the water body are:

- Climate change, which caused a drop in rainfall from 1,500 hectometres to 800 hectometres, while snowfall fell from an average of 70 centimetres to just 2.50 cm.
- The excessive consumption of the farmers around the Senguerr, whose clandestine and unregulated activities have caused the flow of the river to diminish, through the creation of dozens of illegal canals. The situation is so uncontrolled that the ranchers even have private lagoons without any permits, which flood between 500 and 3,000 hectares per farm, creating marshes where there should be none. Additionally, there are producers who have historical canals that are not regulated with sluice gates, which does not allow them to measure the flow they consume.
- The boom in the oil industry that uses water to extract oil, increasing the use of the resource in its exploitation. This use is not controlled and there are no official figures. The companies operating in the area are Pan American Energy, YPF, Sipetrol and Cerro Negro. To aggravate the situation, the Senguerr River, before reaching Lake Múster, enters Santa Cruz, in what is known as ‘the Senguer elbow’, where oil companies operate and also extract water without any control.
- The explosive demographic growth of the cities supplied by the aqueduct, especially Comodoro Rivadavia and the surrounding area.

The evaporation rate of the mirror is 60,000 cubic metres per hour. This means that in two hours the same volume of water that supplies the aqueduct to the cities of Sarmiento, Rada Tilly, Comodoro Rivadavia and Caleta Olivia is lost. In one day, the loss is almost one and a half million cubic metres, while in one year, 550 hectometres evaporate. For 2016, it was confirmed that the level of Lake Musters dropped two metres and retreated more than ten metres from the shore in a single year. Because of the drop, the lake has very large sandbanks. What used to be the beach was 30 or 40 metres in some places, 20 metres in others, and much more in others.

According to the workers of the Sarmiento Provincial Water Institute and its president Gerardo Bulacios, the official version is that there has been a lack of snow and rain. However, this version denies the effect of oil companies and ranch canals. The director of the institute also argues that the claims of the self-convened people for the lakes are politically motivated. The Frente para la Victoria and the movement led by Facundo Jones Huala are said to be behind the claims. He also equated the consumption of the aqueducts and the wastefulness of the cities with the illegal activities on the Senguer River by farmers. As of March 2017, the institute had not fined or taken action against anyone, and even refused to verify the illegal channels in person. Faced with the prospect of imminent drought, the residents of Sarmiento, alarmed by the drop in water levels, gathered in marches and demanded measures. Political inaction led the demonstrators to camp in front of the IPA and to dismantle the embankments that divert the river themselves.

In 2017, a feasibility study was underway to bring water from Lake Fontana to feed the Senguerr and get the lake back on its feet. By March 2017 the lowering of the lake meant that the aqueduct pipe was visible from the shore. The aqueduct carries water to the water treatment plant and from there supplies drinking water to four towns in the area. By March 2017, the gradual disappearance of Lake Musters due to evaporation had reached 200,000 cubic metres per hour. Faced with the seriousness of the environmental situation, the Provincial Water Institute belatedly decided to close the illegal intakes of the Senguerr in order to restore the levels of the lake that supplies the Patagonian populations. The solution to the problem was to be the call for tenders for the closure of the Fontana to regulate the Senguer River, a work that would guarantee the management of the basin. At the same time, INTA took matters into its own hands due to the seriousness of the situation and flew over the lake area. This allowed a report to be drawn up which concluded that the situation was worrying and urgent.

On 27 March, the Sarmiento IPA managed to re-establish the course of the Senguer river, so that it could supply Lake Musters. It was discovered that it had been diverted by the fake Senguer to irrigate fields in the area. Because of this diversion by the landowners, practically no water entered the lake, as 20,000 cubic metres per hour were diverted, almost the normal flow for this time of the year.

In October 2021, the lake registered a more accelerated low water level than in previous periods. This was caused by high temperatures and low rainfall, which accelerated the natural evaporation process that occurs both on Lake Musters and on the Senguer River flow. The phenomenon continued to deepen between January and March, bringing the surface of the lake below the normal operating level of one of the intakes of the aqueduct system. This ended up affecting the towns. Thus, the usual seasonal water deficit was exacerbated. As a result, the schedule of cuts applied by the SCPL to replenish the reserves, which is usually applied between November and March, was extended to May and some days in June in 2022.

In view of the declared water emergency, in 2022 a palliative work was started, financed with funds provided by the Province. The project consists of the installation of electro-submersible pumps to compensate for the water flow that may be lost if the level of the lake falls below the operational level again. Throughout 2022, the catastrophe could be halted because the snowfall in the mountain range was higher than in 2021. This made it possible to restore the river and the low level that the lake had reached almost up to the gates of the last winter. Part of the solution for the river and lake would be the construction of the weir. This work would be the basic solution to regulate the flow of the Senguer River and avoid or reduce the large losses of water due to evaporation. This tool designed to preserve the water of the region was called Presa Nacimiento Río Senguer. The project has a project and the corresponding procedures are being carried out for the national public bidding process, which is currently underway.

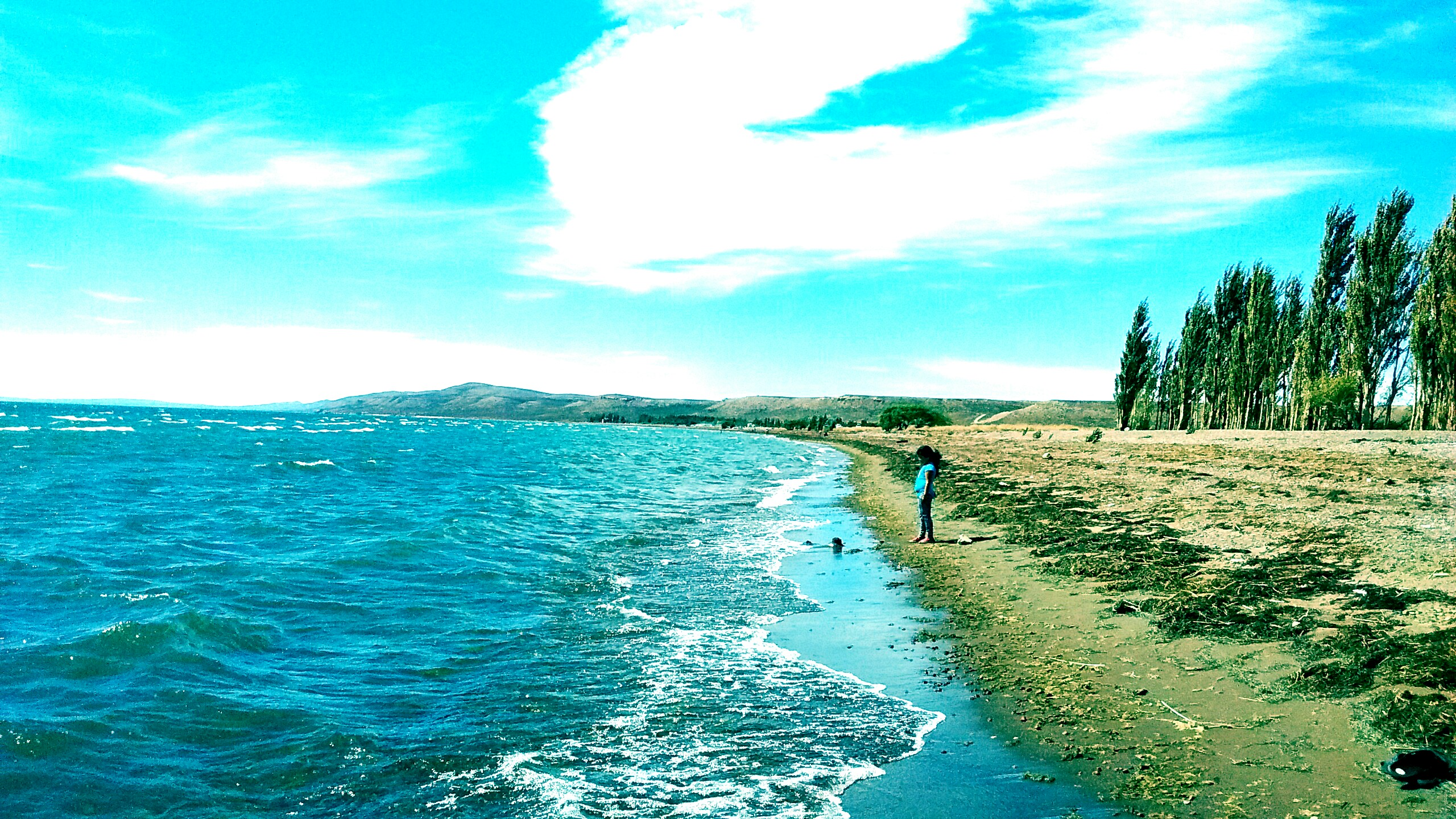
Fine sandy coastline with wind-driven waves

== See also ==
- Lake Musters

== Additional sources ==
- Sistema Nacional de Información Hídrica (in Spanish).
- "Lago Musters." Microsoft® Student 2008 [DVD]. Microsoft Corporation, 2007.
