= Stillman (surname) =

Stillman is a surname. Notable people with the surname include:

== People ==
- Al Stillman (1906–1979), American lyricist
- Ary Stillman (1891–1967), Russian-American painter
- Bob Stillman (born 1954), American actor, singer, and songwriter.
- Bruce William Stillman (born 1953), Australian biochemist and molecular biologist
- Charles Stillman (1810–1875), American business magnate and founder of Brownsville, Texas; father of James Stillman, grandfather of James Stillman Rockefeller
- Cory Stillman (born 1973), Canadian professional ice hockey player
- Denise Stillman (1971–2018), American businesswoman
- Ellicott R. Stillman (1844–1911), American politician
- Fredrik Stillman (born 1966), retired Swedish ice hockey player
- George Stillman (1921–1997), American painter
- George S. Stillman (1879–1907), American football player
- Major Isaiah Stillman (1793–1861), American soldier
- James Stillman (1850–1918), American industrialist and banker, son of Charles Stillman
- James Stillman Rockefeller (1902–2004), American Olympic rower and businessman, son of James Stillman and grandson of Charles Stillman
- John Stillman (architect) (born 1920), British architect
- John Robert Stillman (1946–2009), American actor
- Lou Stillman (1887–1969), born Louis Ingber, boxing trainer and eponymous NY gym owner
- Marie Spartali Stillman (1844–1927), painter of Greek descent
- Michael Stillman (born 1957), American mathematician
- Mimi Stillman (born 1982), American classical flutist
- Norman Stillman (born 1945), professor of Judaic history
- Patrick M. Stillman, retired Rear Admiral of the United States Coast Guard
- Paul Roscoe Stillman, (1871–1945) clinical researcher in periodontology
- Richard J. Stillman II, professor of public administration
- Riley Stillman (born 1998), Canadian ice hockey player
- Stacey Stillman (born 1972), American reality television participant on Survivor: Borneo
- Robert M. Stillman (born 1911), major general in the United States Air Force.
- Whit Stillman (born 1952), American writer-director
- William James Stillman (1828–1901), American painter, journalist, and photographer

== Fictional characters ==
- Lucy Stillman, a fictional character in the Assassin's Creed video game series

== See also ==
- Mariana Stilman (born 1975), Argentine politician
- Stillman (given name)
