= Petrified Forest (Sarmiento) =

Provincial natural monument in Argentina

Sarmiento Petrified Forest Provincial Natural Monument
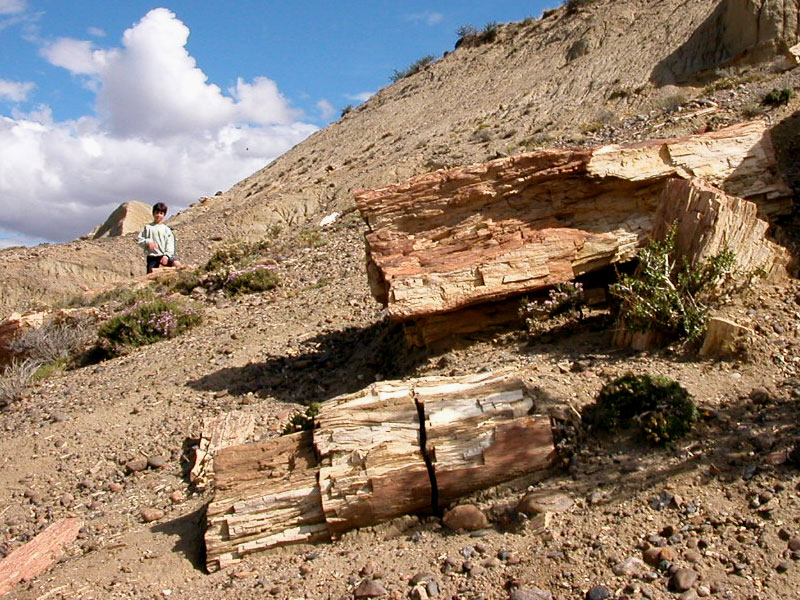
- Petrified trees
- Interactive map of Sarmiento Petrified Forest Provincial Natural Monument
- Nearest city: Sarmiento, Chubut Province, Argentina
- Coordinates: 45°48′56″S 69°03′52″W
- Established: 1973

The Petrified Forest, 30 km (19 mi) south of Sarmiento, Argentina, is a provincial natural monument.

It a forest from the Cenozoic era, the petrified wood is of primitive conifers and palm trees.
