= George Digby Morant =

Royal Navy Admiral (1837-1921)

Admiral Sir George Digby Morant KCB (8 August 1837 – 13 February 1921) was an Anglo-Irish admiral in the British Royal Navy.

== Early life and family ==
Morant was born in Ireland 8 August 1837. There is a record of his baptism in the Parish of Farnborough, Hampshire on 20 January 1838, with parents George and Lydia Morant His father was the elder son of George Morant, of Shirley House, Carrickmacross, and Lydia Hemphill, daughter of John Hemphill, of Rathkeany, Co. Tipperary. Morant's father served in the Grenadier Guards, and was a justice of the peace. The senior line of the Morant family (the elder George Morant being grandson of the former head of the family) lived at Brockenhurst, Hampshire, and claimed Norman descent tracing back from William de Moraunt, of Moraunt's Court, in Kent, who was high sheriff of that county in 1337 and 1338, during the reign of King Edward III. They were later resident in Jamaica, and owned plantations there.

Morant married, in 1866, Sophia Georgina Eyres, younger daughter of Colonel George William Eyres, of the Grenadier Guards. Lady Morant died in 1911, and he died ten years later, on 13 February 1921. Morant was survived by three sons and four daughters. One of Morant's sons, Edgar Robert Morant, D.S.O. (1874-1931) also served as a captain of the Royal Navy. One daughter, Sybil Mary Morant, married the publisher James Blackwood (1878-1951), while another, Aileen Morant (d 1969), married another Royal Navy officer, Captain Llewellyn Evan Hugh Llewellyn (1879-1970). The controversial British-Australian war criminal Harry Harbord "Breaker" Morant claimed to be his illegitimate son, but two months after Morant's execution, Admiral Morant issued a statement denying that Morant was his son or anyway related to him. Inquiries made during 1902 by the newspapers The Northern Miner and The Bulletin identified "Breaker" Morant as 'Edwin Henry Murrant', who was born at Bridgwater, Somerset, England, in December 1864, the son of Edwin Murrant (1836–1864) and Catherine (née Riely) Murrant (1833–1899), master and matron of the Union Workhouse at Bridgwater.

== Naval career ==
Educated at Burney's Royal Naval Academy, Gosport, Morant entered the Royal Navy in 1850. He was a Signal Midshipman on board the steam sloop Tenasserin during the Second Anglo-Burmese War 1852, and took part in the action and capture of the city of Bassein (mentioned in Despatches 20 May 1852). As a Mate, he served in the Crimean War (1853-1856), for which he received the Crimea Medal (two clasps) and in April 1858 the Imperial Order of Medjidie, 5th Class, from the Sultan of Turkey

He was promoted Commander in February 1866, Captain in February 1873, Rear-Admiral before 1895, and Vice-Admiral in June 1895. He served as Inspector of Irish Lights 1875–78,

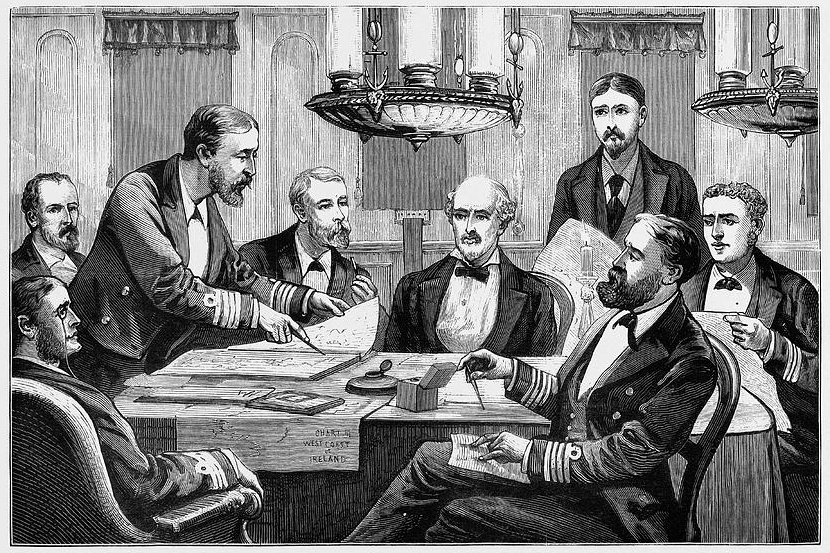
In the back saloon of HMS Lively, the Duke of Edinburgh marking out the plan for the next day's work, the Duke of Edinburgh's Relief Squadron. Digby Morant, front, second from the right. The Graphic 1880

appointed Commodore-in-Charge, Hong Kong February 1884 to February 1887. Commodore-Superintendent at Pembroke Dockyard, and served as Admiral-Superintendent, Chatham Dockyard 1892–95.

In March 1901 he was promoted to Admiral, but he retired on his own request in May the same year, and was knighted as a Knight Commander of the Order of the Bath (KCB) in the King's Birthday Honours List the following November

During his career he commanded the following ships: Grasshopper, Enterprise, Cockatrice, Valorous, Achilles, Victor Emmanuel (as Commodore), and received war medals for operations in Burma, the Baltic, Crimea, and China.

== National Portrait Gallery ==
- "Photographs of Sir George Digby Morant, National Portrait Gallery".
