= Paul Roscoe Stillman =

Periodontist

Paul Roscoe Stillman (1871–1945) was a clinical researcher in the field of periodontology. He was the first to define occlusal trauma in 1917.
