= Cyril Stileman =

English cricketer and engineer (1879 – 1943)

Personal information
- Full name: Cyril George Stileman
- Born: 9 September 1879; Barrow-in-Furness, Lancashire, England
- Died: 4 December 1943 (aged 64); Westminster, London, England
- Batting: Unknown
- Relatives: Frederic Stileman (brother)

Domestic team information
- Years: Team
- 1910/11–1921/22: Europeans

Career statistics
| Competition | First-class |
|---|---|
| Matches | 1 |
| Runs scored | 13 |
| Batting average | 6.50 |
| 100s/50s | –/– |
| Top score | 8 |
| Balls bowled | 192 |
| Wickets | 4 |
| Bowling average | 28.35 |
| 5 wickets in innings | – |
| 10 wickets in match | – |
| Best bowling | 4/113 |
| Catches/stumpings | 2/– |
- Source: Cricinfo, 30 December 2023

Cyril George Stileman (9 September 1879 – 4 December 1943) was an English first-class cricketer and civil engineer.

The son of the civil engineer Francis Stileman, he was born at Barrow-in-Furness in September 1879. He was educated at The Abbey School in Beckenham and Burney's Academy in Gosport. He was a pupil with his father from 1899 to 1903, assisting him with the construction of railways and docks with the Furness Railway. He went to British India in 1903, where he was an assistant engineer with the Bombay Port Trust until 1910. From 1910 to 1918, he was the Port Trust's executive engineer, later becoming its deputy chief engineer for construction. Stileman was later employed by Sir Alexander Gibb & Partners, where was head of their Bombay office by 1926.

Whilst in India, Stileman made one appearance in first-class cricket for the Europeans cricket team against the Parsees at Poona in the 1905–06 Bombay Presidency Match. Playing in the side as a bowler, he took figures of 4 for 113 in the Parsees first innings. Batting twice, he was dismissed in the Europeans first innings for 5 runs by K. B. Mistry, while following-on in their second innings, he was dismissed for 8 runs by the same bowler. Prior to his move to India, Stileman played club cricket for Barrow Cricket Club, in addition to playing field hockey for Lancashire. Stileman later retired to England, where he died at Westminster in December 1943. His brother, Frederic, was also a first-class cricketer for the Europeans. The cricketer and sailor Charles Evan-Thomas was his brother-in-law.
