= Stillman (given name) =

Stillman is sometimes used as a given name. People with the name include:

- Stillman Drake (1910–1993), Canadian and American historian of science
- Stillman T. Meservey (1848–1927), American, banker, industrialist, and politician
- Stillman Rouse (1917–1997), American professional football player
- Stillman Witt (1808—1875), American railroad and steel industry executive

== See also ==
- Stillman (surname)
