= Frederic Stileman =

English cricketer and merchant (1882 – 1949)

Personal information
- Full name: Frederic Ford Stileman
- Born: 4 February 1882; Barrow-in-Furness, Lancashire, England
- Died: 29 May 1949 (aged 67); Charlwood, Surrey, England
- Batting: Unknown
- Relatives: Cyril Stileman (brother)

Domestic team information
- Years: Team
- 1910/11–1921/22: Europeans

Career statistics
| Competition | First-class |
|---|---|
| Matches | 6 |
| Runs scored | 157 |
| Batting average | 15.70 |
| 100s/50s | –/– |
| Top score | 37 |
| Catches/stumpings | 3/– |
- Source: Cricinfo, 30 December 2023

Frederic Ford Stileman (4 February 1882 – 29 May 1949) was an English first-class cricketer and merchant.

The son of the civil engineer Francis Stileman, he was born at Barrow-in-Furness in February 1882. He was educated at the Lancaster Royal Grammar School. After completing his education, Stileman went to British India where he was a merchant. In India, he played first-class cricket for the Europeans cricket team, making his debut for the team against the Parsees in the 1910–11 Bombay Presidency Match. He made a further five appearances in the Presidency Matches until 1921, with his final appearance coming against Parsees. In his six matches, he scored 157 runs at an average of 15.70, with a highest score of 37. In business, Stileman was amongst the first subscribers of The Associated Cement Companies upon its foundation in 1936. He later retired to England, where he died in May 1949 at Charlwood, Surrey. His brother, Cyril, was also a first-class cricketer for the Europeans.
