= Senguerr River =

River in Argentina

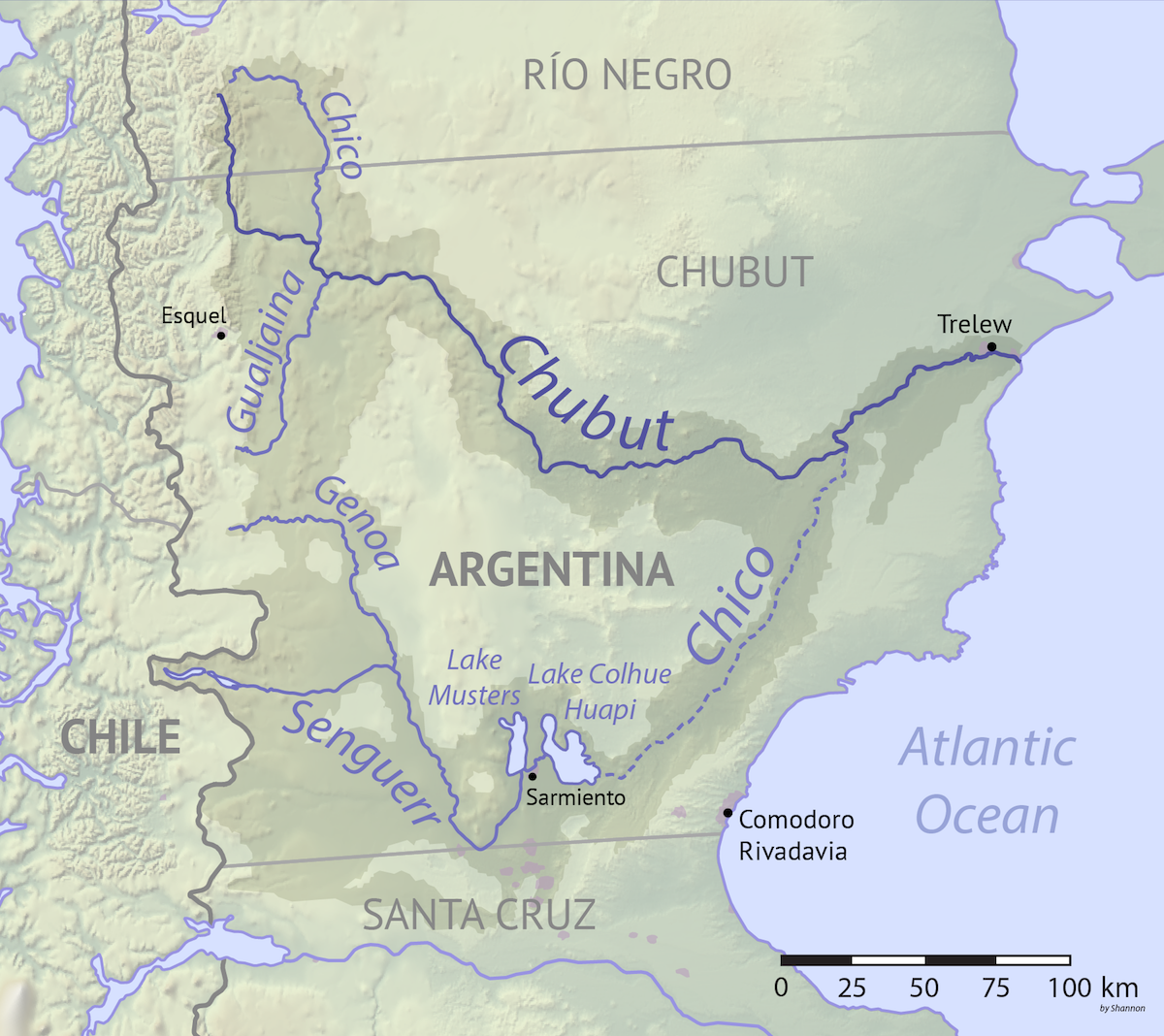
Map of the Chubut River drainage basin. The Senguerr River flows into Lake Musters at bottom center.

The Senguerr River is a river of the Argentine province of Chubut. It begins its journey from the system of glacial lakes La Plata and Fontana in the Andes Mountains.

The river flows generally eastward, then circles around the southern end of the San Bernardo Mountains and then flows north-northeastward in several ramifications that end at the Lake Musters. On years of great precipitation, some arms of the river might reach the Colhué Huapi Lake, which has been greatly reduced in size in recent years. The average inflow is 49 cubic metres per second (1,700 cu ft/s).

== See also ==
- Río Senguer Department
- Lake Musters
