= George Chaworth Musters =

British naval officer and traveller (1841–1879)

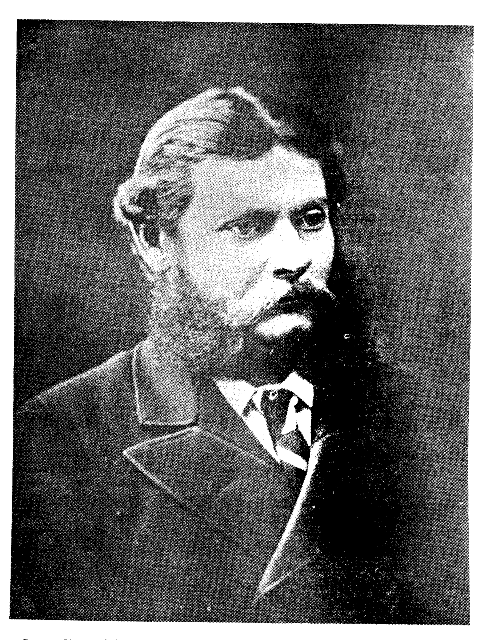
George Chaworth Musters

George Chaworth Musters (1841–1879) was a British Royal Navy commander and traveller, known as the "King of Patagonia".

== Life ==
He was born in Naples while his parents were travelling, 13 February 1841, the son of John George Musters of Wiverton Hall, Nottinghamshire, formerly of the 10th Royal Hussars, and his wife Emily, daughter of Philip Hamond of Westacre, Norfolk. His paternal grandparents were John Musters of Colwick Hall, Nottinghamshire, "the king of gentlemen huntsmen", who had married in 1805 Mary Anne Chaworth, heiress of Chaworth of Annesley Hall, Nottinghamshire, the "Mary" of Lord Byron's poem, The Dream. Musters was one of three children.

His father dying in 1842, and his mother in 1845, Musters was brought up mainly by his mother's brothers, one of whom, Robert Hamond, had sailed with Admiral Robert Fitzroy in HMS Beagle. He went to school at Saxby's in the Isle of Wight, and Green's at Sandgate, Kent, and then to Burney's academy at Gosport, to prepare for a naval career.

Musters was entered on board HMS Algiers, 74 guns, in 1854, and served in her in the Black Sea during the Crimean War, receiving the English and Turkish Crimean medals by the time he was 15. In October 1856 he was transferred to HMS Gorgon, and served in 1857–8 in HMS Chesapeake, and in 1859–61 in HMS Marlborough. In 1861 he passed in the first class in his examination; was posted to the royal yacht HMY Victoria and Albert; promoted to lieutenant 4 September 1861, and appointed to the sloop HMS Stromboli, Captain Philips, serving in her on the coast of South America from December 1861 until she was paid off in June 1866. When at Rio de Janeiro in 1862 he and a midshipman of the Stromboli, as a prank, climbed Sugarloaf Mountain, and planted the British ensign on the summit.

While on the South American station Musters bought land, and started sheep-farming at Montevideo. After he was placed on half-pay, he carried out a plan of travelling in South America. This undertaking occupied 1869–70. Musters lived on good terms with the indigenous Tehuelche people, travelling with one group from the Magellan Straits to the Río Negro, and then traversing the northern part of Patagonia from east to west, a distance of 1400 miles. The Royal Geographical Society of London presented him with a gold watch in 1872. After his return to England he often preferred to sleep in the garden wrapped in a blanket.

Musters subsequently visited Vancouver Island. Returning to South America, he set out to traverse Chile and Patagonia from west to east, but was obliged to return to Valparaíso. He came home to England in 1873, married, and went out to South America with his wife to reside in Bolivia. From February 1874 to September 1876 he travelled much in Bolivia and the adjoining countries. His account was published with maps by John Birch Minchin. After his return home he lived mostly with his brother at Wiverton.

In October 1878 Musters went to London, in order to prepare for Mozambique, where he had been appointed consul. He died on 25 January 1879, with a reputation as a fearless explorer, and a man of tact and winning manners.

== Works ==
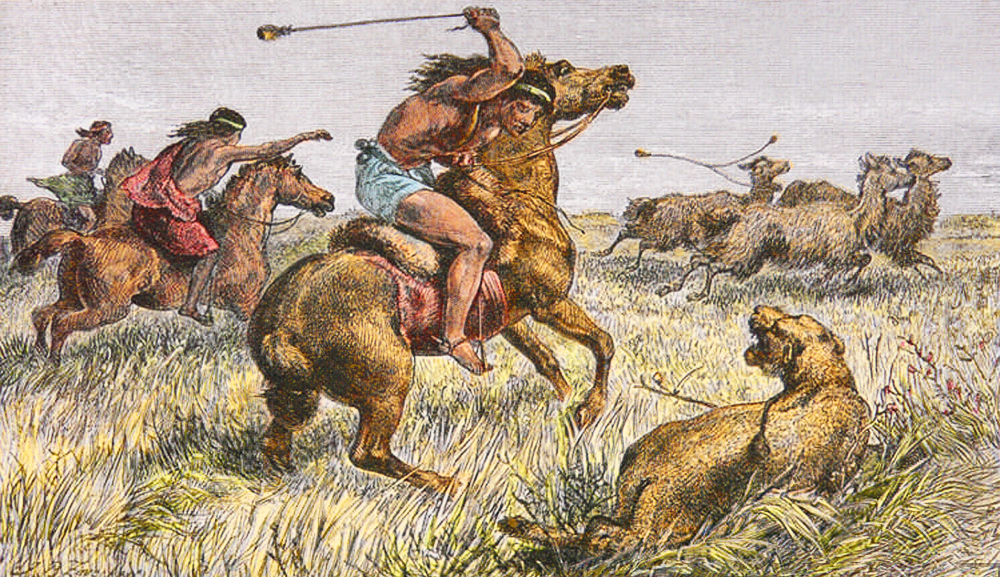
Wáki killing a Puma, illustration from At Home with the Patagonians by George Chaworth Musters

The Patagonian journey of Musters was described by him in At Home with the Patagonians, a Year's Wanderings on Untrodden Ground from the Straits of Magellan to the Rio Negro, London, 1871, 2nd ed. 1873.

== Family ==
Musters married in 1873 Herminia, daughter of George Williams of Sucre, Bolivia.

== Notes ==
Attribution

This article incorporates text from a publication now in the public domain: Lee, Sidney, ed. (1894). "Musters, George Chaworth". Dictionary of National Biography. Vol. 39. London: Smith, Elder & Co.
