= Sarmiento Department, Chubut =

Sarmiento Department
- Departamento Sarmiento
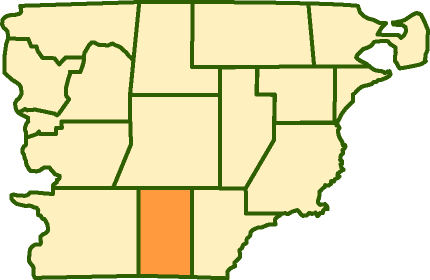
- Coordinates: 45°35′S 69°05′W
- Country: Argentina
- Province: Chubut
- Capital: Sarmiento

Area
  - Total: 14,563 km^{2} (5,623 sq mi)

Population (2001)
  - Total: 8,724
  - Density: 0.6/km^{2} (2/sq mi)
- Post Code: U9107

Sarmiento Department is a department of Chubut Province in Argentina.

The provincial subdivision has a population of about 8,724 inhabitants in an area of 14,563 km^{2}, and its capital city is Sarmiento, which is located around 1,909 km from the Capital federal.

== Settlements ==
- Buen Pasto
- Sarmiento
- Matasiete
- Las Pulgas
- Los Manantiales
- Puerto El Chulengo
