= Sarmiento, Chubut =

Sarmiento
- Town
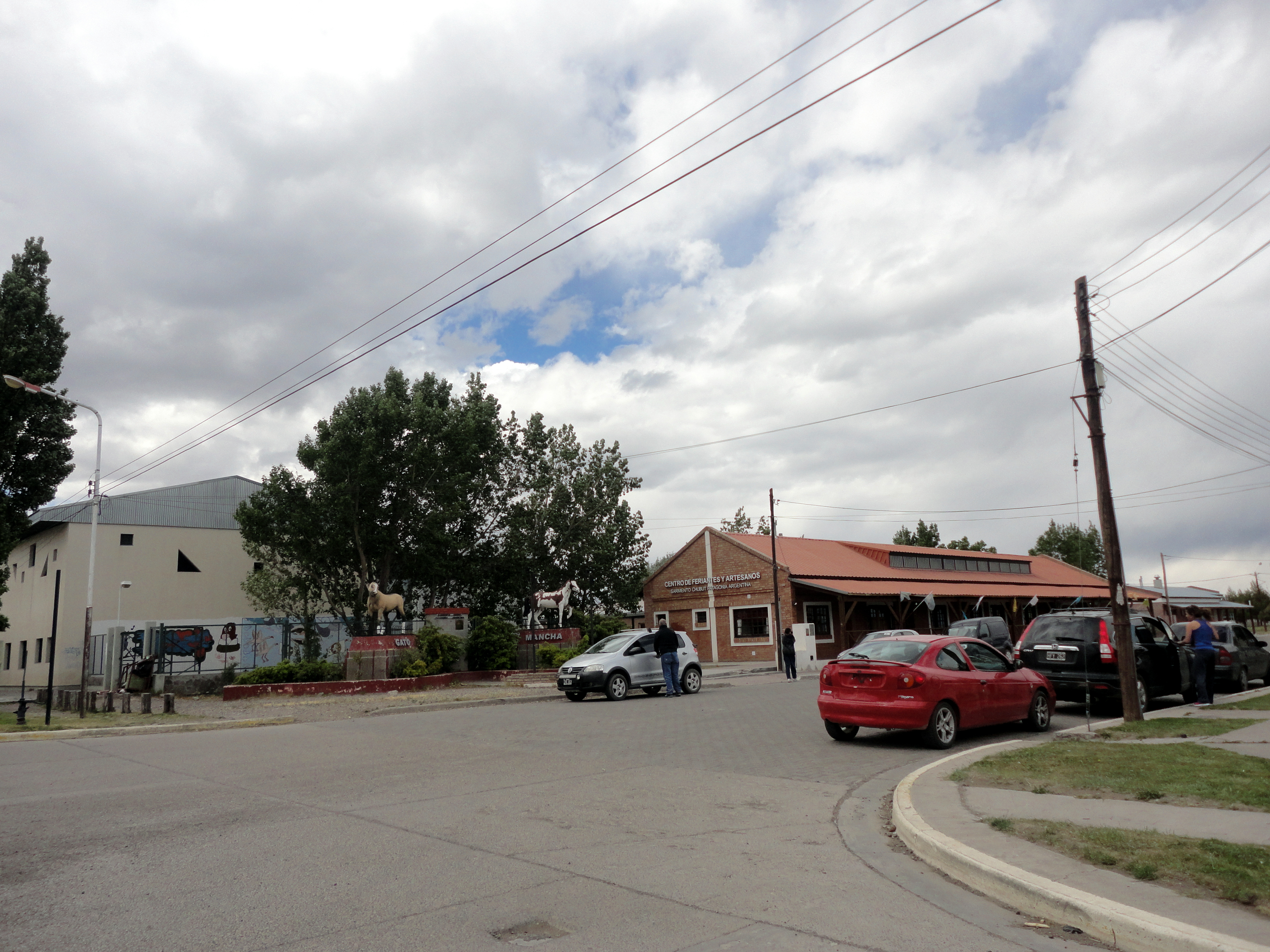
- Sarmiento artisan center

- Location of Sarmiento in Argentina
- Coordinates: 45°36′S 69°5′W
- Country: Argentina
- Province: Chubut
- Department: Sarmiento

Government
  - Intendant: Sebastián Ángel Balochi

Population (2022)
  - Total: 14,289
- Time zone: UTC−3 (ART)
- CPA base: U9020
- Dialing code: +54 297

Sarmiento is a town in the province of Chubut, Argentina. It has about 14,289 inhabitants as per the 2022 census [INDEC], and is the head town of the department of the same name. It is located on the so-called Central Corridor of Patagonia, in a fertile valley amidst an otherwise arid region, 140 km west from Comodoro Rivadavia, in the south of Chubut. It sits between two lakes, Lake Musters and Lake Colhue Huapi. Notable attractions are the Petrified Forest and caves with Aborigine hand paintings.

== History ==
Sarmiento was born as a colony of immigrants, mainly from Wales (see y Wladfa). In the early 1900s it also experienced an influx of immigrants from Lithuania.

In 1900, Argentine authority was locally established when the Swedish former sailor Oscar Lundqwist, who had been appointed police commissioner to Sarmiento, set up the first "comisaría" ever in Sarmiento. It was situated next to "Las Tres Casas" where the Jones families from Wales and the Briton Pryce lived.

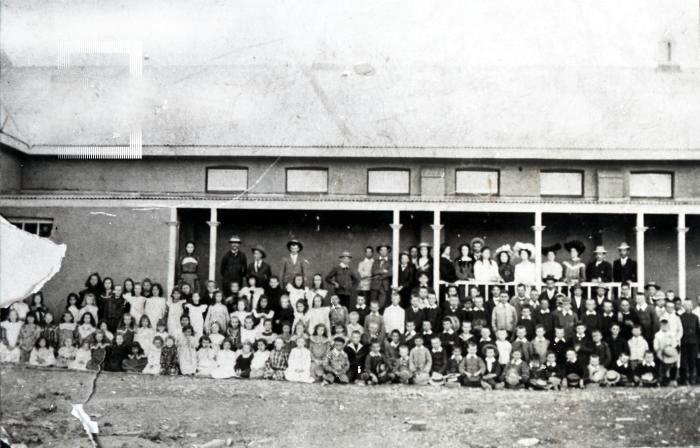
Boer immigrants at Colonia Sarmiento Station.

In 1903, 600 Afrikaner families arrived in Argentina following the loss of the Second Boer War. They settled in the region as it had access to water unlike the coastal city of Comodoro Rivadavia where they first settled. The descendants of these colonists make up a large portion of the population of Sarmiento and still speak Afrikaans and attend the Nederduitse Gereformeerde Kerk ("Dutch Reformed Church") to this day. As recently as the 1960s Afrikaans was the most commonly spoken language however this has changed as the town's Afrikaans population has become more assimilated into Argentinian culture and society.

In 2016, an important fossil dinosaur was discovered near the town. It is named Sarmientosaurus musacchio in honor of the town and of the late Dr. Eduardo Musacchio, a paleontologist and professor at the National University of Patagonia San Juan Bosco.

== Climate ==
Under the Köppen climate classification, Sarmiento features a cold desert climate (Köppen climate classification: BWk), with warm summers and cool winters. The coldest temperature at low elevation ever recorded in South America, −32.8 °C (−27.0 °F), was recorded in Sarmiento on June 1, 1907. Precipitation is low, averaging only 183 millimetres (7 in) per year.

Climate data for Sarmiento, Chubut (1941–1950)
| Month | Jan | Feb | Mar | Apr | May | Jun | Jul | Aug | Sep | Oct | Nov | Dec | Year |
|---|---|---|---|---|---|---|---|---|---|---|---|---|---|
| Record high °C (°F) | 37.6 (99.7) | 36.7 (98.1) | 33.4 (92.1) | 26.8 (80.2) | 22.0 (71.6) | 20.0 (68.0) | 16.5 (61.7) | 19.7 (67.5) | 23.3 (73.9) | 29.0 (84.2) | 32.0 (89.6) | 35.8 (96.4) | 37.6 (99.7) |
| Mean daily maximum °C (°F) | 25.3 (77.5) | 24.4 (75.9) | 21.5 (70.7) | 17.3 (63.1) | 12.0 (53.6) | 9.0 (48.2) | 8.8 (47.8) | 10.4 (50.7) | 14.2 (57.6) | 18.8 (65.8) | 21.2 (70.2) | 23.8 (74.8) | 17.2 (63.0) |
| Daily mean °C (°F) | 17.8 (64.0) | 16.8 (62.2) | 14.2 (57.6) | 11.0 (51.8) | 7.3 (45.1) | 4.7 (40.5) | 4.1 (39.4) | 5.0 (41.0) | 8.1 (46.6) | 12.0 (53.6) | 14.1 (57.4) | 16.4 (61.5) | 11.0 (51.8) |
| Mean daily minimum °C (°F) | 11.6 (52.9) | 10.8 (51.4) | 8.8 (47.8) | 5.9 (42.6) | 3.2 (37.8) | 1.0 (33.8) | 0.2 (32.4) | 0.6 (33.1) | 3.1 (37.6) | 6.4 (43.5) | 8.4 (47.1) | 10.5 (50.9) | 5.9 (42.6) |
| Record low °C (°F) | 1.5 (34.7) | 1.5 (34.7) | −2.0 (28.4) | −5.8 (21.6) | −12.4 (9.7) | −32.8 (−27.0) | −18.6 (−1.5) | −10.7 (12.7) | −6.9 (19.6) | −3.8 (25.2) | −1.0 (30.2) | 2.2 (36.0) | −32.8 (−27.0) |
| Average precipitation mm (inches) | 12 (0.5) | 11 (0.4) | 19 (0.7) | 15 (0.6) | 28 (1.1) | 14 (0.6) | 24 (0.9) | 14 (0.6) | 14 (0.6) | 5 (0.2) | 18 (0.7) | 9 (0.4) | 183 (7.2) |
| Average relative humidity (%) | 42 | 43 | 47 | 56 | 65 | 71 | 69 | 61 | 52 | 44 | 41 | 38 | 52 |
| Mean monthly sunshine hours | 270 | 232 | 214 | 171 | 133 | 99 | 121 | 171 | 183 | 226 | 234 | 260 | 2,314 |
Source 1: Sistema de Clasificación Bioclimática Mundial, World Meteorological Organization (June record low only)
Source 2: Danish Meteorological Institute (sun and relative humidity)

Climate data for Sarmiento Aeroclub (1993–2013)
| Month | Jan | Feb | Mar | Apr | May | Jun | Jul | Aug | Sep | Oct | Nov | Dec | Year |
|---|---|---|---|---|---|---|---|---|---|---|---|---|---|
| Record high °C (°F) | 38.0 (100.4) | 37.0 (98.6) | 36.0 (96.8) | 31.0 (87.8) | 23.0 (73.4) | 19.0 (66.2) | 18.5 (65.3) | 19.0 (66.2) | 27.0 (80.6) | 30.0 (86.0) | 34.0 (93.2) | 35.0 (95.0) | 38.0 (100.4) |
| Mean maximum °C (°F) | 32.4 (90.3) | 32.6 (90.7) | 29.4 (84.9) | 24.5 (76.1) | 19.8 (67.6) | 14.6 (58.3) | 15.0 (59.0) | 16.5 (61.7) | 20.7 (69.3) | 24.8 (76.6) | 28.1 (82.6) | 30.9 (87.6) | 34.7 (94.5) |
| Daily mean °C (°F) | 18.9 (66.0) | 18.1 (64.6) | 15.1 (59.2) | 11.4 (52.5) | 7.5 (45.5) | 4.1 (39.4) | 3.7 (38.7) | 5.7 (42.3) | 8.8 (47.8) | 12.3 (54.1) | 14.8 (58.6) | 17.7 (63.9) | 11.5 (52.7) |
| Mean minimum °C (°F) | 6.7 (44.1) | 5.5 (41.9) | 2.8 (37.0) | −0.2 (31.6) | −4.8 (23.4) | −6.3 (20.7) | −8.2 (17.2) | −5.3 (22.5) | −2.9 (26.8) | 0.7 (33.3) | 3.4 (38.1) | 5.6 (42.1) | −9.3 (15.3) |
| Record low °C (°F) | 4.0 (39.2) | 0.0 (32.0) | 0.0 (32.0) | −3.5 (25.7) | −11.0 (12.2) | −12.5 (9.5) | −19.0 (−2.2) | −9.0 (15.8) | −6.5 (20.3) | −3.0 (26.6) | 0.0 (32.0) | 3.0 (37.4) | −19.0 (−2.2) |
| Average precipitation mm (inches) | 6.6 (0.26) | 10.6 (0.42) | 15.2 (0.60) | 11.8 (0.46) | 24.9 (0.98) | 23.0 (0.91) | 14.4 (0.57) | 16.4 (0.65) | 13.9 (0.55) | 11.0 (0.43) | 10.4 (0.41) | 5.5 (0.22) | 163.7 (6.44) |
Source: Ministerio del Interior, Obras Públicas y Vivienda

== See also ==
- Lake Musters
